= List of prehistoric lakes =

This a partial list of prehistoric lakes. Although the form of the names below differ, the lists are alphabetized by the identifying name of the lake (e.g., Algonquin for Glacial Lake Algonquin). YBP = Years Before Present.

== North America ==
=== Endorheic basins ===
- Estancia Valley, Central New Mexico, United States
  - Lake Estancia, glacial paleolake that once hosted cutthroat trout
- Plains of San Agustín, Central New Mexico, United States
  - Lake San Agustín, present day site of the Very Large Array
- Tularosa basin, Southern New Mexico, United States
  - Lake Otero
  - Lake Lucero; Once much larger, the present day lake is an alkali lake and the main source of gypsum for White Sands National Park, the largest gypsum dune field in the world.
- Great Basin
  - Mono Lake Lee Vining, California.

=== Atlantic Drainage ===
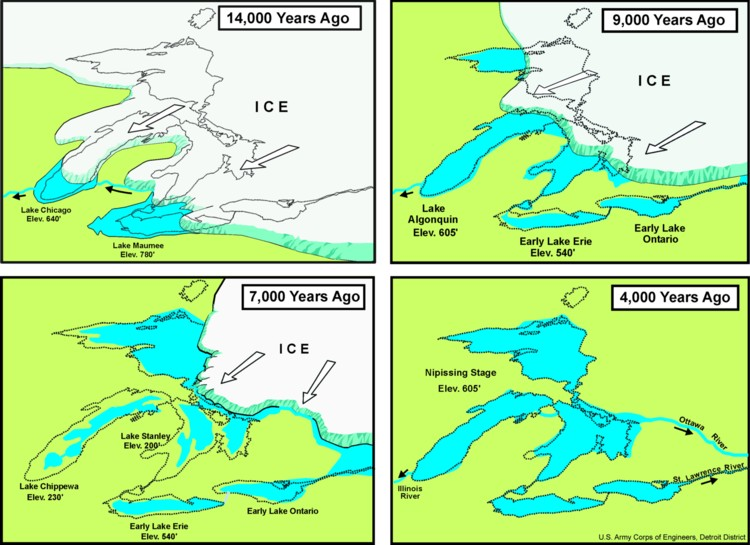
Stages of proglacial lake development in the region of the current North American Great Lakes

- St. Lawrence River drainage, i.e., the Great Lakes
  - Champlain Sea; 11,800 – 8,200 YBP on the lower St. Lawrence, from Ottawa River to the Gulf of St. Lawrence
  - Lake Ontario basin: 8,400 YBP
    - Early Lake Ontario; 8,700 – 11,800 YBP
    - Lake Admiralty; 10,000 YBP
    - Lake Frontenac; 12,000 – 11,000 YBP covering the Ontario basin and to the northeast up the St. Lawrence Valley covering the low lands north to the Ottawa River and Montreal.
    - Glacial Lake Iroquois; 13,000 – 10,500 YBP and covered all of the Ontario basin and southward across central New York, reaching to the Finger Lakes.
  - Finger Lakes of New York plus 12 minor lakes
    - Dansville Lake in the Canaseraga valley
    - Scottsburg Lake in the Conesus valley
    - Naples Lake in the Canandaigua valley
    - Hammondsport Lake in the Keoka valley.
    - Watkins Lake in the Seneca valley
    - Ithaca Lake in the Cayuga valley
  - Lake Erie (8,400 YBP) basin
    - Early Lake Erie; 11,800 – 8,700 YBP in Ohio, Ontario, Michigan, Pennsylvania, and New York and located in the Erie basin
    - Lake Lundy; 2,000 YBP in Ohio, Ontario, Pennsylvania, and New York
    - Lake Elkton stage of Lake Lundy @ 620 feet (190 m) above sea level
    - Lake Dana stage of Lake Lundy @ 590 feet (180 m) above sea level
    - Lake Grasmere stage of Lake Lundy @ 640 feet (200 m) above sea level
    - Lake Tonawanda; 10,000 YBP in western New York
    - Lake Wayne; ended by 12,000 YBP in Ohio, Pennsylvania, and New York, expanding from Lake Warren to cover most of the Erie basin
    - Lake Warren; 12,700 YBP in Ohio, Pennsylvania, and New York, covering southern portion of the basin
    - Lake Whittlesey; 13,000 – 12,700 YBP in Ohio, Ontario, Michigan, and Pennsylvania. It covered the western half of the Erie basin and north over southwest Ontario to the tip of Lake Huron.
    - Lake Arkona; 13,600 – 13,200 YBP in Ohio, Ontario, Michigan, and Pennsylvania. Covered two-thirds of the Erie basin, north across southwest Ontario to include the southern tip of Lake Huron, the ‘thumb’ of Michigan and low lands south and west of Saginaw Bay.
    - Lake Maumee; 14,000 – 13,000 YBP in Ohio, Ontario and Michigan. The western basin reaching to Fort Wayne, Indiana.
  - Lake Rouge in Michigan south of Detroit.
  - Lake St. Clair and the Detroit River:
    - Early Lake St. Clair: 12,500 – 5,500 YPB in Lake St. Clair; Michigan and Ontario.
  - Lake Huron basin
    - Later Lake Saginaw in Saginaw Bay on the lower peninsula of Michigan.
    - Nipissing Great Lakes; 5,500 - 4,500 YBP
    - Lake Nipissing; 8,400 – 5,500 YBP formed as the water bodies in the Superior and Huron basins merged across Sault Ste. Marie around 8,400 YBP and then merged with the Michigan basin around 7,800.
    - Lake Stanley-Hough; 8,700 YBP, the water levels had risen to connect both Lake Stanley and Lake Hough into a single body of water.
    - Lake Stanley; 9,000 YBP covered only the northern and eastern portion of the main Huron basin with channels into Lake Hough.
    - Lake Hough; 9,000 YBP covered Georgian Bay, Ontario.
    - Glacial Lake Algonquin; 9,000 – 7,000 YBP
    - Lake Stanley; to 10,000 YBP
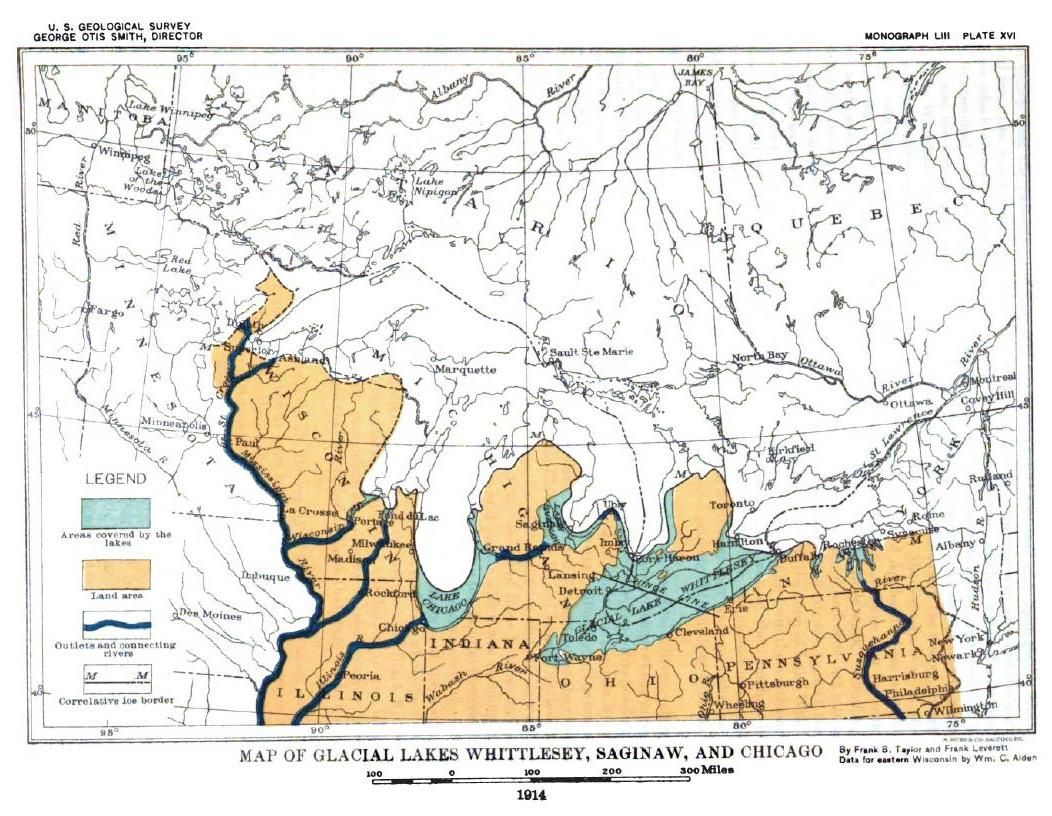
      Map of Glacial lakes Whittlesey, Saginaw and Chicago
    - Lake Saginaw; 13,500 YBP 10,300 YBP along the southern shore of Saginaw Bay and the low lands to the southwest.
  - Lake Michigan (1,500 YBP) basin
    - Nipissing Great Lakes: 5,500 - 4,500 YBP
    - Lake Nipissing; 8,400 – 5,500 YBP formed as the water bodies in the Superior and Huron basins merged across Sault Ste. Marie around 8,400 YBP and then merged with the Michigan basin around 7,800.
    - Glacial Lake Algonquin; 9,000 – 7,000 YBP
    - Lake Chippewa; 10,700 – 7,500 YBP, covered the lowest elevations in the Lake Michigan basin forming a linear lake in the middle, linked by a narrow proto-Straits of Mackinac and the Mackinac Falls to Lake Stanley.
    - Lake Chicago; 14,000 – 11,000 YBP along the southern shore and growing slowly northward.
  - Lake Superior basin
    - Precursor Lakes, before the formation of basin wide bodies of water.
      - Lake Ashland
      - Lake Brule
      - Lake Nemadji
      - Lake Ontonagon
      - Lake St. Louis
    - Nipissing Great Lakes: 8,400 – 5,500 YBP formed as the water bodies in the Superior and Huron basins merged across Sault Ste. Marie around 8,400 YBP and then merged with the Michigan basin around 7,800.; - 5,500; - 4,500 YBP
    - Lake Houghton; 8,700 – 8,000 YBP covered the Superior basin in Ontario, Minnesota, Wisconsin, and Michigan.
    - Fenton Lake; 9,500 YBP occupied a shallow basin in the eastern side of Lake Superior after Lake Minong had shrunk below rock sills internal to the lake basin.
    - Lake Minong; 10,300 – 9,800 YBP covering most of the modern Superior basin.
    - Post-Duluth Lake; 10,600 YBP along the Wisconsin and Michigan shore, reaching less than halfway across the basin.
    - Lake Duluth; 11,500 – 11,000 YBP in the western half of the Superior basin.
    - Glacial Lake St. Louis occupied St. Louis Bay at the southern tip of modern Lake Superior.
    - Lake Keweenaw; 12,500 – 12,000 YBP in the western Superior basin.
- Atlantic Ocean
  - Lake Albany in the valley of the Hudson River.
  - Glacial Lake Block Island off the south coast of Rhode Island, west of Block Island.
  - Glacial Lake Cape Cod in Massachusetts.
  - Lake Colebrook on the border of Vermont and New Hampshire, crossing into Quebec.
  - Lake Coos on the border of Vermont and New Hampshire.
  - Lake Connecticut; 20,000 – 18,000 YBP, covered Long Island Sound.
  - Glacial Lake Hitchcock; 15,000 YBP in the valley of the Connecticut River.
  - Glacial Lake Nantucket Sound in Massachusetts.
  - Glacial Lake Narragansett covered Narragansett Bay in Rhode Island.
  - Lake Merrimack in New Hampshire in the Merrimack River valley
  - Lake Passaic; 19,000 – 14,000 YBP in New Jersey
  - Glacial Lake Rhode Island off the south coast of Rhode Island, east of Block Island
  - Lake Sciota; in the eastern Poconos Pennsylvania.
  - Lake Stowe; 15,000 YBP in central Vermont.
  - Lake Vermont in Vermont, New York states, and the province of Quebec.
  - Lake Winooski in Vermont.
  - Lubbock Lake in Texas (see Lubbock Lake Landmark)

==== Via the Gulf of Mexico ====
- Mississippi River basin
  - Glacial Lake Calvin in southeast Iowa
- Illinois River basin
  - Lake Baroda in Michigan on the lower St. Joseph River.
  - Lake Dowagiac in Michigan on the lower Dowagiac River, now a branch of the St. Joseph River which now flows into Lake Michigan.
  - Lake Madron in Michigan at the junction of the St. Joseph River and the Dowagiac River.
  - Lake Kankakee; 13,600 – 13,200 YBP
  - Glacial Lake Ottawa in Illinois on the upper Illinois River.
  - Glacial Lake Pontiac in Illinois on the lower Vermillion River.
  - Glacial Lake Wauponsee in Illinois at the headwaters of the Illinois River.
  - Lake Watseka in Illinois on the Iroquois River.
- Ohio River basin
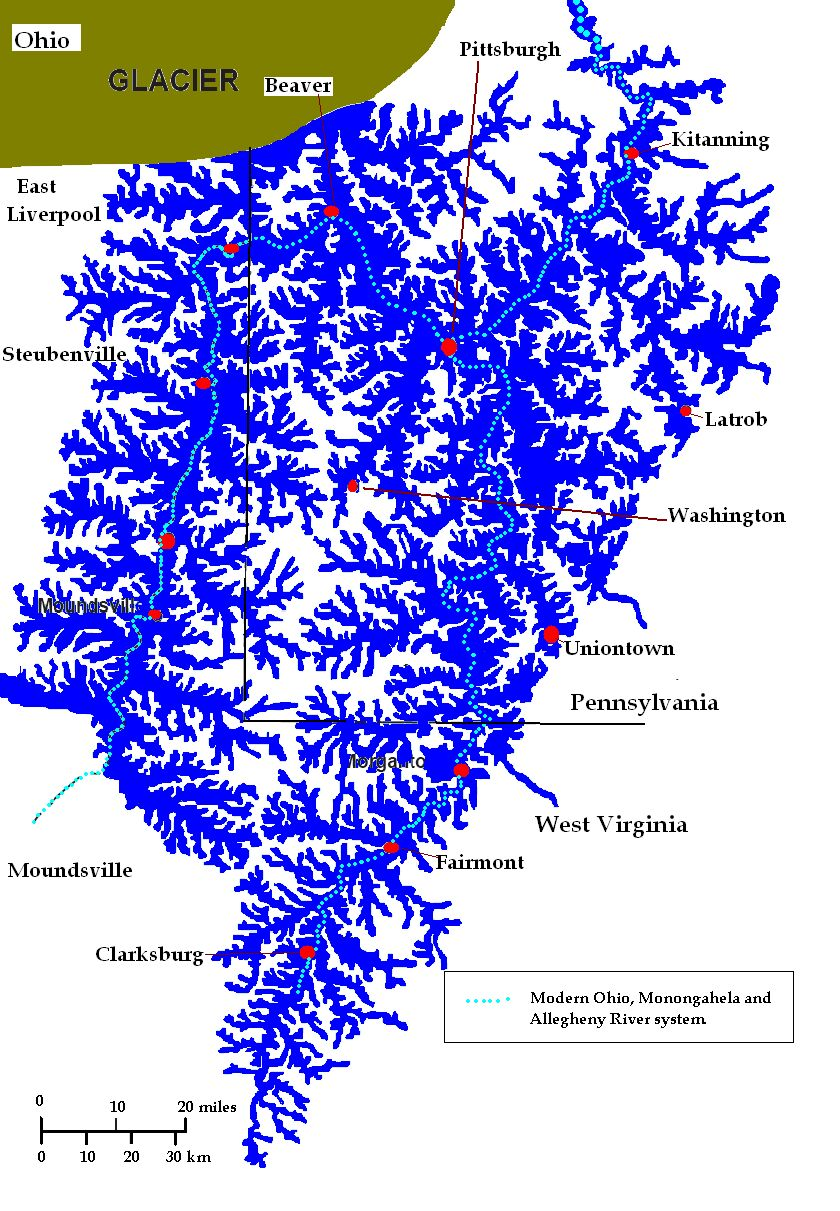
  Lake Monongahela during its most expansive period
  - Lake Monongahela, along the Allegheny, Monongahela and upper Ohio Rivers.
  - Glacial Lake Tight, named for William G. Tight along the Ohio and West Virginia border.
- Upper Mississippi River basin
  - Lake Upham north of Duluth, Minnesota.
  - Lake Aitkin along the Mississippi River near Grand Rapids, Minnesota.
  - Lake Minnesota at the great bend in the Minnesota River at Mankato, Minnesota
  - Glacial Lake Baraboo, communicating with Glacial Lake Wisconsin here
  - Glacial Lake Grantsburg, draining through the St. Croix River,
  - Lake Oshkosh; 13,600 - YBP. on the central Wisconsin River.
  - Glacial Lake Wisconsin; 18,000 – 14,000 YBP in Wisconsin along the Wisconsin River.
- Missouri River basin
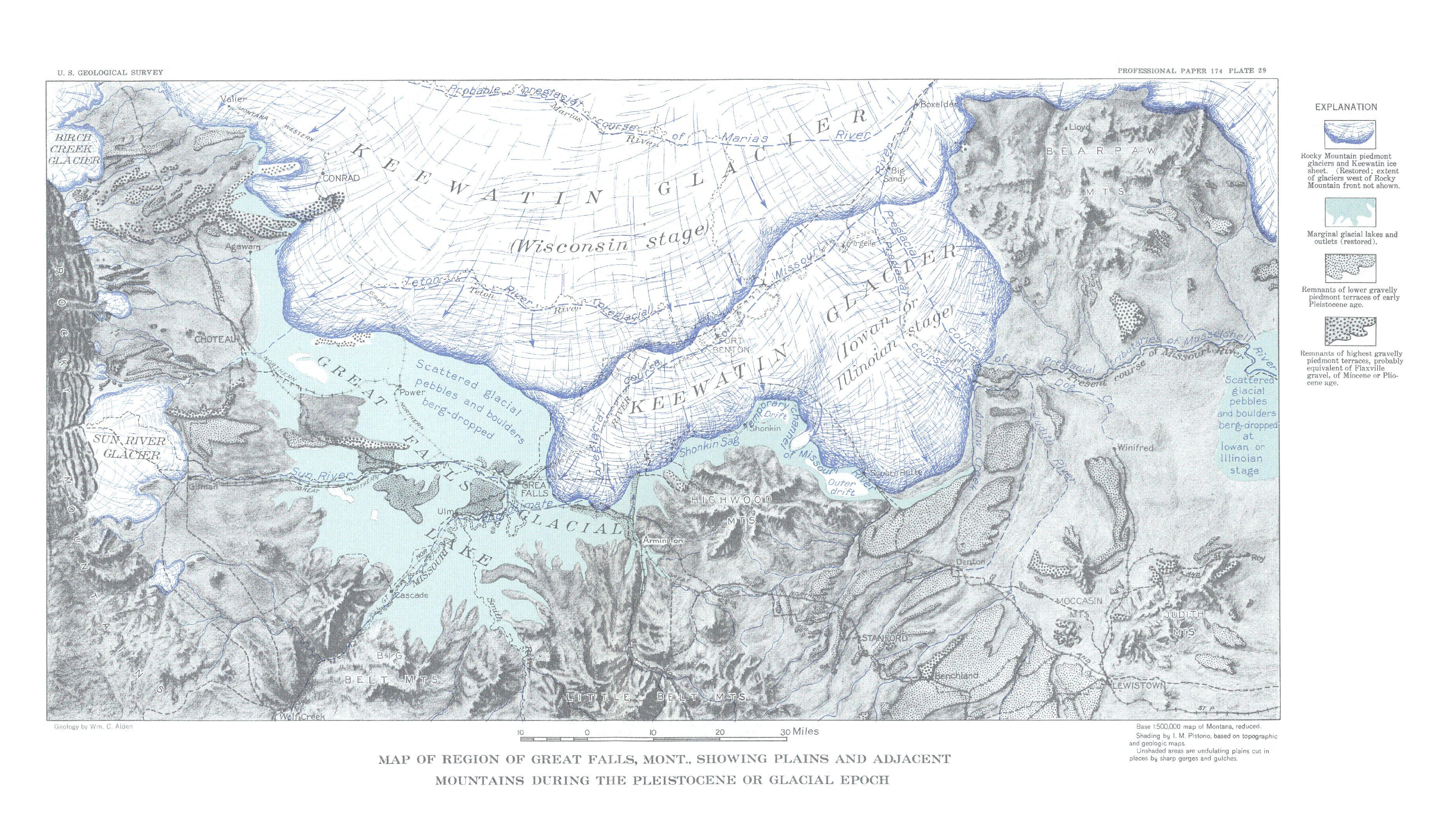
  Glacial Lake Great Falls
  - Glacial Lake Great Falls; 17,000 – 13,000 YBP in Montana near Great Falls, Montana.
  - Lake Cut Bank in Montana on the Marias River near Cut Bank.
  - Lake Chouteau in Montana
  - Lake Musselshell in Montana on the Musselshell River.
  - Lake Jordan in Montana
  - Lake Circle in Montana,
  - Lake Glendive in Montana on the Yellowstone River, upstream from its junction with the Missouri River.
  - Lake Crow Flies High in North Dakota between Williston and New Town.
  - Lake McKenzie in North Dakota from the Great Bend, south to the South Dakota border.
- Rio Grande basin
  - Lake Alamosa in Colorado
  - Lake Cabeza de Vaca in extreme southern New Mexico, United States, and northern Chihuahua, Mexico; once the ultimate destination of the Rio Grande until it was captured by the Pecos River
    - Pluvial Lake Palomas in the same area, but fed by the now-endorheic Mimbres River; now a major source of sand for the Médanos de Samalayuca

=== Arctic Drainage ===
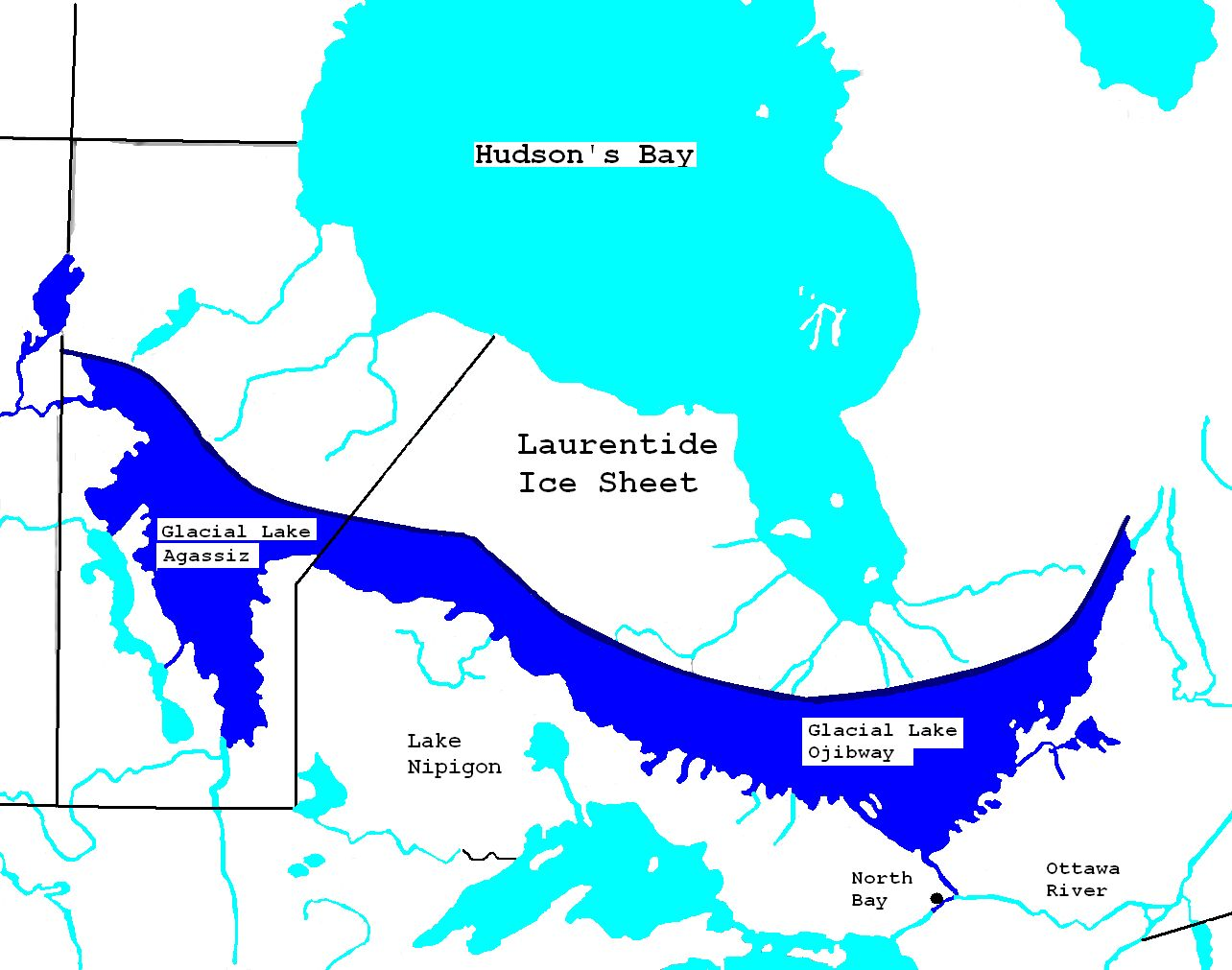
Map of Glacial Lake Agassiz and Lake Ojibway c. 7900 YBP

- Mackenzie River basin
  - Lake MacKenzie in the Northwest Territories.
  - Lake McConnell; 11,800 – 8,400 YBP
  - Lake Agassiz; 12,875 – 8,480 YBP in Manitoba and Ontario, stretching south in the James River valley of North Dakota and Minnesota.
  - Modern: Lake Winnipeg, Cedar Lake (Manitoba), Lake Winnipegosis, Lake Manitoba, Lake of the Woods
    - Lake Edmonton in Alberta
    - Lake Peace in Alberta and British Columbia
    - Lake Regina
    - Lake Hind in southwestern Manitoba
    - Lake Souris across North Dakota and Manitoba
  - Hudson Bay drainage
    - Tyrrell Sea; 7,000 – 6,000 YBP
    - Lake Ojibway; 8,500 – 8,200 YBP
    - Lake Antevs
    - Lake Nakina in Ontario, east of Lake Nipigon

=== Pacific Drainage ===
A map of Pleistocene lakes in the Great Basin, showing the path of the Bonneville flood about 14,500 years ago

- Pacific Ocean:
  - Lake Atna drained from present-day Copper River Basin
  - Glacial Lake Bretz drained north from present-day Puget Sound in Washington
  - Lake Cahuilla in Southern California at the Salton Sea and today's cities of Indio, Mexicali, and El Centro, CA
  - Glacial Lake Hood formed in the southern hook of the Hood Canal and drained south through Glacial Lake Russell at Tacoma and the Black River Valley to the Chehalis River.
  - Lake Modoc formed on the Klamath River, at Upper Klamath Lake, Lower Klamath Lake and Tule Lake
  - Lake Nisqually preceded Lake Russell and waters, west of Tacoma, including the Narrows.
  - Lake Puyallup was on the middle and upper Puyallup River and preceded Lake Tacoma.
  - Glacial Lake Russell drained south from present-day Puget Sound in Washington.
  - Glacial Lake Sammamish preceded Lake Sammamish, draining into Glacial Lake Russell’s bay in the Lake Russell’s bay in the Lake Washington basin east of Seattle.
  - Lake Skokomish drained the southeast flank of the Olympic Mountains in the Skokomish River basin.
- Lake Tacoma was at the southern end of the Vashon Glacier in Puget Sound covering Commencement Bay, extending south up the Puyallup River valley. Washington basin east of Seattle.
  - Glacial Lake Snoqualmie in Washington State
- Columbia River basin:
  - Lake Allison; 15,000 – 13,000 YBP in the Willamette Valley of Oregon.
  - Lake Canadian on the Washington/Oregon border above The Dalles
  - Lake Condon; 15,000 – 13,000 YBP on the Columbia River on the Washington/Oregon border above The Dalles and below Wallula Gap.
  - Lake Lewis; 16,000 YBP in central Washington, new Yakima.
  - Glacial Lake Columbia in central Washington State
  - Glacial Lake Spokane in eastern Washington near Spokane.
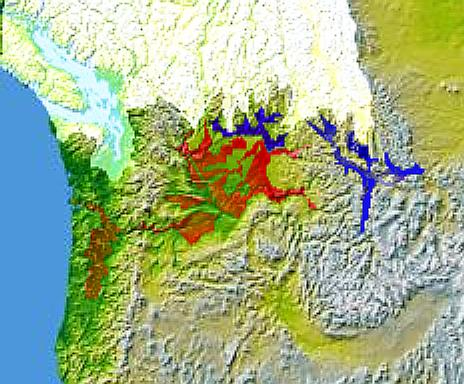
    Glacial Lake Columbia (west) and Glacial Lake Missoula (east) are shown south of the Cordilleran Ice Sheet. The areas inundated in the Columbia and Missoula floods are shown in red.
  - Lake Missoula; 15,000 – 13,000 YBP in western Montana.
- Great Basin of California, Nevada, Utah, Oregon & Idaho:
  - Lake Lahontan; 12,700 – 9,000 YBP in Nevada, California and Oregon.
  - Lake Alvord in Oregon and Nevada
  - Lake Amboy in California
  - Lake Bonneville; 32,000 – 14,500 YBP in Utah and Idaho and Nevada.
  - Lake Carpenter in Nevada
  - Lake Chewaucan in Oregon
  - Lake Clover in Nevada
  - Lake Dixie in Nevada
  - Lake Franklin in Nevada
  - Lake Harney-Malheur in Oregon
  - Lake Klamath in California and Oregon
  - Lake Madeline in California
  - Lake Manly; 186,000 – 10,000 YBP, covered Death Valley
  - Lake Mojave in California
  - Lake Owens in California
  - Lake Panamint in California
  - Lake Railroad in Nevada
  - Lake Russell in Nevada and California
  - Lake Searles in California
  - Lake Spring in Nevada
  - Lake Steptoe in Nevada
  - Lake Tecopa
  - Lake Thompson
  - Lake Toiyabe in Nevada
  - Lake Tulare in California
  - Lake Tule in California
  - Lake Waring in Nevada

== Europe ==
Ancylus Lake c. 10,000 years ago. "Svea älv" was a strait within the lake while Göta älv formed an outlet to the Atlantic Sea.

- Lake Komi, a proglacial lake formed in the vicinity of the present-day Russian Komi Republic
- White Sea Ice Lake, freshwater period of the White Sea
- Baltic Ice Lake, freshwater period of the Baltic Sea
- Ancylus Lake, freshwater period of the Baltic Sea
- Lake Harrison in the Midlands in England
- Lake Lapworth in Shropshire in England
- Lake Orcadie of the Old Red Sandstone, Scotland
- Lake Pickering between the North York Moors and the Yorkshire Wolds in England
- Ebro endorheic lake system, in the Ebro Basin, (Spain)
- Duero endorheic lake system, in the Duero Basin, (Spain)
- Gjende Lake in the Jotunheimen mountains of Norway
- Zechstein Sea covering all of central and Northern Europe (Saltwater)

== South America ==
- Altiplano Cundiboyacense
  - Lake Humboldt, Pleistocene lake on the Bogotá savanna
- Altiplano Boliviano
  - Cabana, a lake level highstand of Lake Titicaca
  - Lake Escara
  - Inca Huasi
  - Mataro, a lake level highstand of Lake Titicaca
  - Lake Minchin
  - Ouki
  - Sajsi
  - Salinas
  - Lake Tauca
  - Cancosa paleolake
- Patagonia
  - Great Tehuelche Paleolake

== Asia ==
Ice Age lakes of Siberia and Central Asia

- Mundafan, Arabia
- West Siberian Glacial Lake
- Lake Bandung in Indonesia
- Lake Tengger

== Africa ==
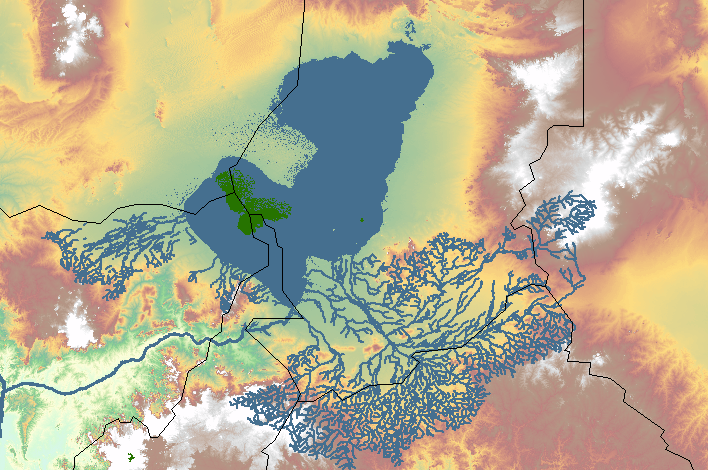
Lake Chad during the African humid period about 10,000 years ago (blue) and in 20th century (green).

- Lake Makgadikgadi in the Kalahari Desert in Africa
- Lake Ptolemy
- Chad Basin what is now Lake Chad
- Lake Congo, what is now the Congo Basin
- Lake Suguta

== Oceania ==
- Lake Carpentaria, Australia
- Lake Bungunnia in the Murray Basin, Australia
- Eromanga Sea in the Eromanga Basin, Australia
- Lake Huka, North Island, New Zealand
- Lake Manuherikia, Maniototo Plain, South Island, New Zealand
- Lake Walloon, Lake Winton, and Lake Dieri, Australia, of which the modern Lake Eyre is a remnant

== See also ==
- List of endorheic basins
- List of lakes
