= Lake Minong =

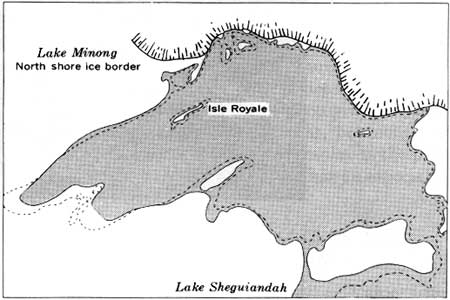
- Glacial Lake Minong

- Location within Michigan
- Location: North America
- Group: Great Lakes
- Coordinates: 47.7°N 87.5°W
- Lake type: former lake
- Etymology: Historic Name of Isle Royale
- Primary inflows: From Lake Agassiz through the Nipigon River
- Primary outflows: Grand River valley in Michigan
- Basin countries: Canada; United States
- First flooded: 10,000 years before present
- Residence time: 1,500 years in existence
- Surface elevation: 450 ft (137 m)
- References: Glacial and Postglacial Geologic History of Isle Royale National Park, Michigan; N. King Huber; The Geology of Isle Royale National Park, Michigan; Geological Survey Professional Paper 754-A; United States Government Printing Office, Washington, D.C.; 1973.

Lake Minong was a proglacial lake that formed in the Lake Superior basin during the Wisconsin glaciation around 10,000 B.P. This was the last glacial advance that entered Michigan and covered only part of the upper peninsula. Lake Minong occurred in the eastern corner of the Lake Superior basin while Lake Duluth was in the western end. The lakes became separated when the glacier reached the upper peninsula. Lake Minong expanded to the north as the ice retreated after 9,800 B.P. When the ice retreated from the Keweenaw Peninsula, Lake Duluth merged into Lake Minong.

== Chronology ==
- 11,400 B.P. Lake Minong covered only Whitefish Bay with the Laurentian glacial mass lying across the central Lake Superior basin. Lake Duluth existed in the lowlands of St. Louis Bay and Spirit Lake on the St. Louis River.
- 10,600 B.P. The glacial ice had receded northward, opening a link between the eastern and western basins of Lake Superior.
- 9,500 B.P. Lake Minong expands to cover the entire lake basin as the glacial front moves northward from the basin. At this time, Lake Minong is an intermediary basin with waters from Lake Agassiz flowing in through the Nipigon River valley and further east through the Aquasabong valley.
- 8,500 B.P. Lake Superior forms as the Lake Agassiz basin joins with the Lake Ojibway, shifting its drainage into the headwaters of the Ottawa River. The Lake Superior basin becomes the headwaters of the Great Lakes system.

== See also ==
- List of prehistoric lakes

Glacial Lakes in the Lake Superior basin:

- Lake Keeweenaw
- Glacial Lake St. Louis
- Lake Duluth
- Lake Minong
- Lake Houghton
- Nipissing Great Lakes
