= Lake Tonawanda =

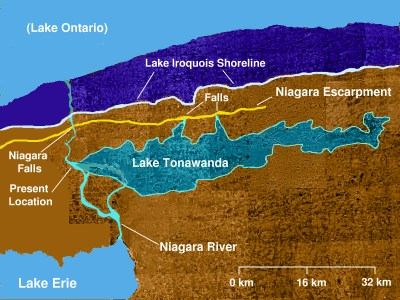
- Outline of Glacial Lake Tonawanda.

- Location within New York
- Location: North America
- Group: Great Lakes
- Coordinates: 43.0819°N 78.7488°W
- Lake type: former lake
- Etymology: Tonawanda, which means "swift waters," was the name given to the area by Neuter and Erie Indians, the area's original inhabitants, and it probably refers to the Niagara River current. Early Visitors.
- Primary inflows: Early Lake Erie
- Primary outflows: Lake Iroquois
- Basin countries: United States
- First flooded: 10,000 years before present
- Max. length: 42 mi (68 km)
- Max. width: 15 mi (24 km)
- Surface elevation: 476 ft (145 m)
- References: Ernest H. Muller (1977), LATE GLACIAL AND EARLY POSTGLACIAL ENVIRONMENTS IN WESTERN NEW YORK; Annals of the New York Academy of Sciences 288

Lake Tonawanda was a prehistoric lake that existed approximately 10,000 years ago at the end of the last ice age, in Western New York, United States.

The lake existed on the southern (upper) side of the Niagara Escarpment east of the present course of the Niagara River between Early Lake Erie to the south and Glacial Lake Iroquois (the ancestor of Lake Ontario) to the north. During the retreat of the glaciers, the water levels of the Great Lakes were higher. Lake Tonawanda was created and fed by the elevated waters of Lake Erie. Lake Tonawanda itself was drained into Lake Ontario by a series of falls over the escarpment, including one at present day Lockport, New York.

The lake evaporated when the waters of Lake Erie dropped below the level of the feeder streams to the lake. Subsequently Lake Erie drained over the escarpment entirely through Niagara Falls, which marks roughly the western terminus of the former lake bed.

The remains of the previous falls, which rivaled Niagara Falls in grandeur, can be seen along the escarpment. The sinking of homes in the lakebed has been an ongoing problem in communities such as Amherst, New York.

== See also ==
- List of prehistoric lakes
