= Lake McConnell =

Former lake in Canada

Lake McConnell was a very large proglacial lake that existed in what is now Canada from 11,800 to 8,300 years ago. Other sources give starting and ending dates of about 12,000 and between 9,000 and 8,000 years ago, respectively. It covered parts of what are now the Great Bear Lake, Great Slave Lake and Lake Athabasca basins up to an elevation of 280 m (920 ft) or 305 m (1,001 ft), with a maximum surface area of 210,000 km^{2} (81,000 mi^{2}) achieved 10,500 years ago. At its greatest length of 1,100 km (680 mi), it was longer than any modern freshwater lake. "Lake McConnell (or its smaller predecessor, Lake Peace) is believed to have drained first into Lake Agassiz", an even larger lake to the southeast, "then into the Arctic Ocean via the Mackenzie River, then back into Lake Agassiz, and then back to the Arctic Ocean" at various times in its history. Between 9,000 and 8,000 years ago, it divided to form Great Slave Lake and Lake Athabasca. These two and Great Bear Lake are considered its 'daughter' lakes.

== See also ==
- List of prehistoric lakes
