= Early Lake Erie =

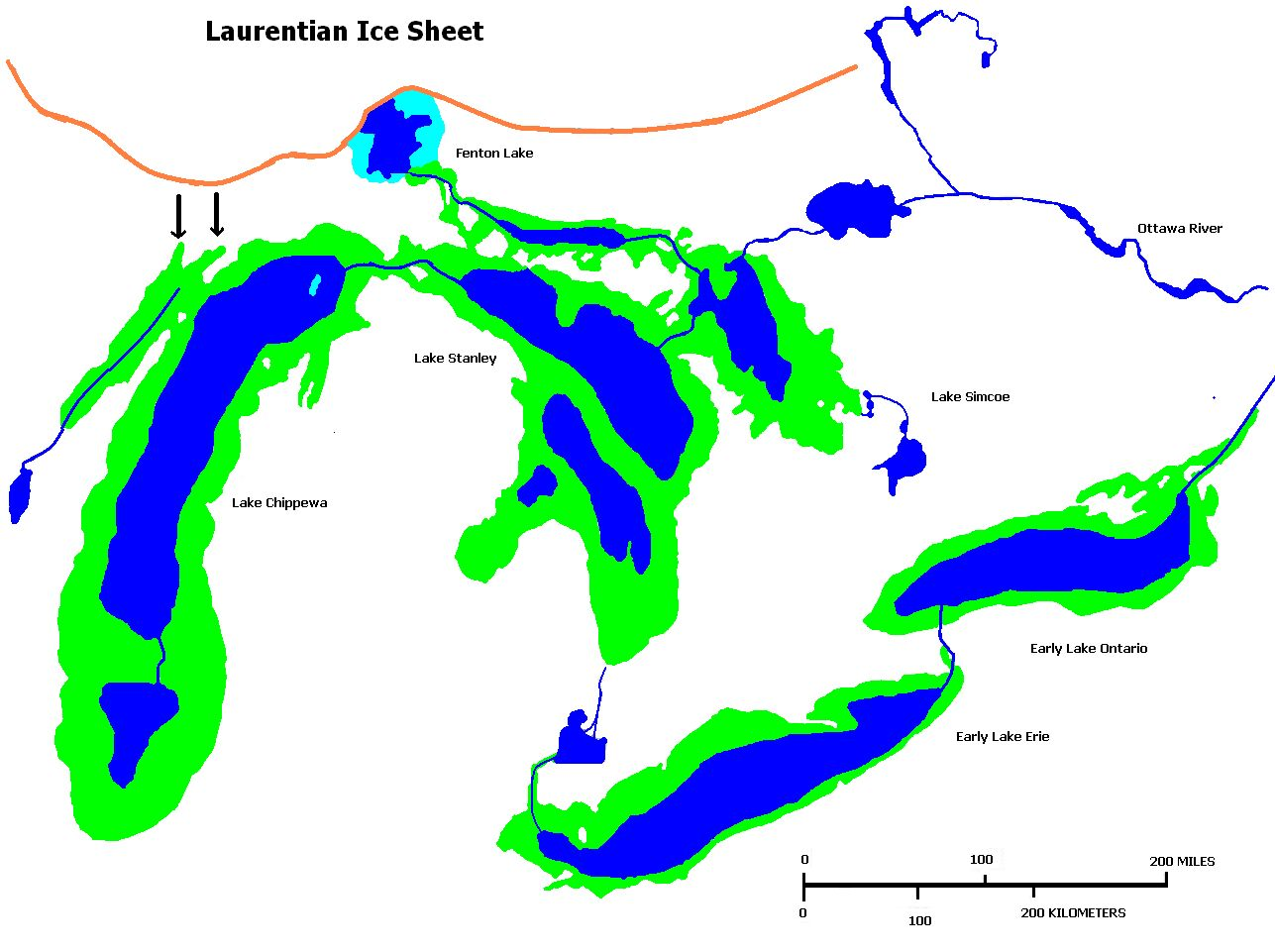
- Glacial Lakes Chippewa, Stanley, Early Erie and Early Ontario. Low-level lake stages during the end of the Wisconsin Glacial era in North America. Based on Larsen map, 1987.

- Location within North America
- Location: North America
- Group: Great Lakes
- Coordinates: 42.6°N 79.7°W
- Lake type: former lake
- Etymology: Lake Erie from the Erie Indians
- Primary inflows: Detroit River
- Primary outflows: Niagara River; Welland Canal
- Basin countries: Canada; United States
- First flooded: 13,000 years before present
- Max. length: 241 mi (388 km)
- Max. width: 57 mi (92 km)
- Residence time: 300 years in existence
- Surface elevation: 476 ft (145 m)
- References: Lewis CFM, Cameron GDM, Anderson TW, Heil CW Jr, Gareau PL. 2012. Lake levels in the Erie Basin of the Laurentian Great Lakes. Journal of Paleolimnology 47:493-511.

Early Lake Erie was a prehistoric proglacial lake that existed at the end of the last ice age approximately 13,000 years ago. The early Erie fed waters to Glacial Lake Iroquois.

The ancient lake was similar in size to the current lake during glacial retreat, but for some period the eastern half of the lake was covered with ice.

Early-period Lake Erie was made up of smaller lakes (Lakes Warren, Wayne, Maumee and Lundy) with lower depths. Much of the ancient lake bed is now northern Ohio.

== Early (low) Stage ==
12,000 years before present (YBP) the Laurentian ice sheet had melted to the east, creating an outlet for the Lake Erie basin at the Niagara Escarpment. Simultaneously, the ice sheet had opened a drainage between Lake Algonquin and Lake Ontario through the Kirkfield Outlet. This ended the outflow from Lake Algonquin into the Lake Erie Basin. Holocene history of Lake Erie began with a flood of water over the Niagara Escarpment. The flood created a channel in the moraines and bedrock lower water level in the Erie basin. The Niagara River Outlet, was over 50 metres (160 ft) lower than the present level of Lake Erie creating a non-glacial lake, called Early Lake Erie. At this stage water elevation was 120 metres (390 ft) above sea level. The lake consisted of two lobes, one in the eastern basin and a smaller lake in the central basin.

=== Discharge from Lake Algonquin ===
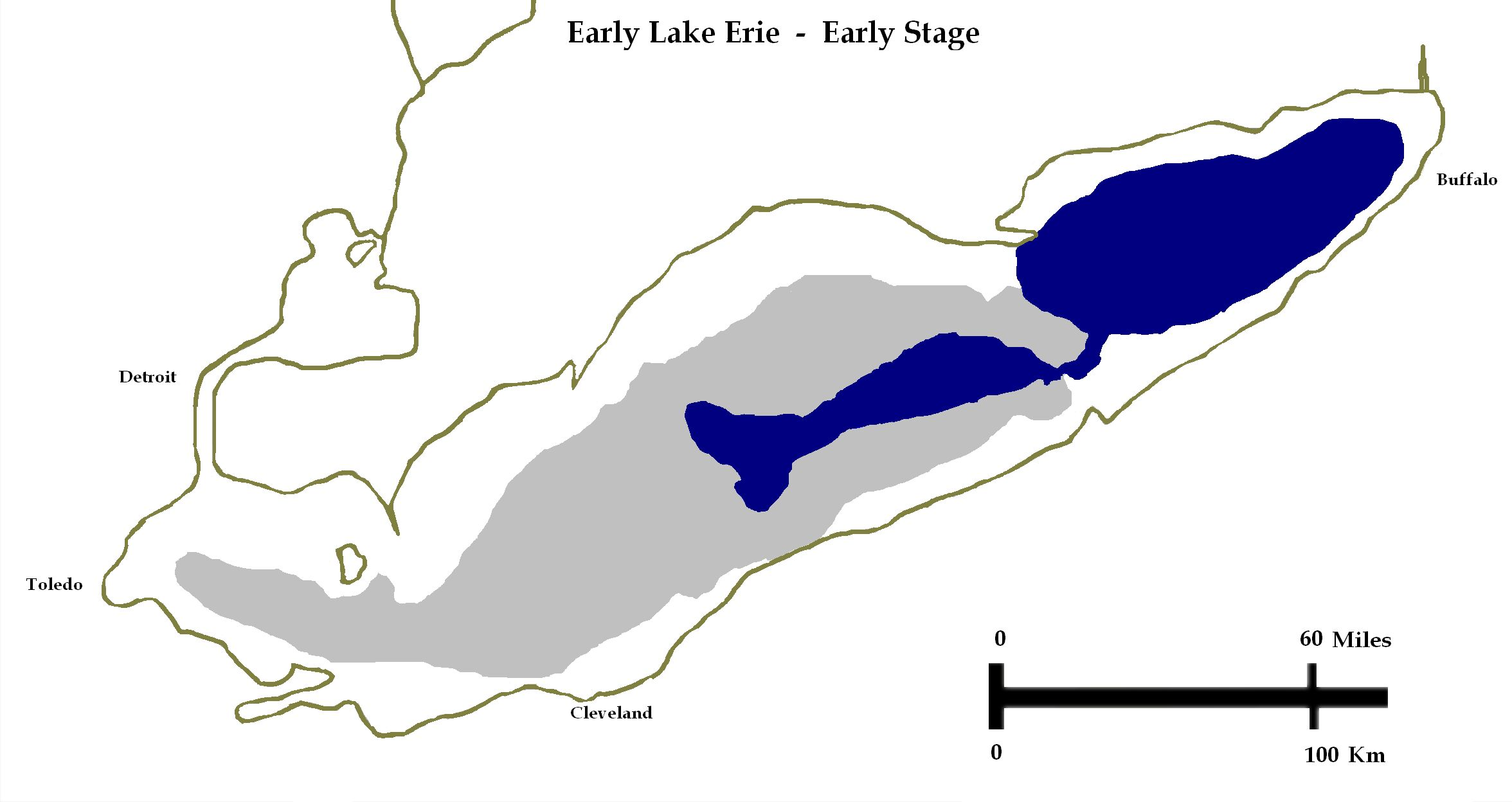
Early or Low-Level Stage of Early Lake Erie. Herdendorf, 2013. Gray is deep water basin, blue is Early Lake Erie.

About 10,400 YBP the ice sheet advanced southward, blocking the Kirkfield Outlet. Once again, the Lake Erie basin received water from Lake Algonquin, through the Port Huron Outlet and the new St. Clair River-Lake St. Clair-Detroit River system. The additional water created a marshy swamp in the western basin, then it created a river system through the Pelee Passage. The shallow central basin overflowed the Norfolk Moraine creating the Pennsylvania Channel into the eastern basin. The deeper eastern basin overflowed Niagara Escarpment by the Niagara River for a brief time. There is still a division of ideas about whether Early Lake Erie overflowed the Niagara River at this time or remained without an overflow.

=== Second low stage ===
By 10,300 YBP the North Bay Outlet opened between Lake Algonquin and the St. Lawrence River. The level of Lake Algonquin dropped, ending the outflow through the Port Huron outlet. For several thousand years Early Lake Erie did not receive water from the upper basins. This low water stage lasted for 5,000 years. The lake lost over 90 percent of its inflow, becoming stagnant. The lake became eutrophic, acerbated by lower precipitation and increased evaporation. A closed or endorheic lake basin was created Bathymetric data compiled by National Geographic Data Center in 1998 located a former shoreline submerged below Lake Erie. The Buffalo Ridge shoreline in the eastern basin is 10 to 12 metres (33 to 39 ft) below the current river outlet. The central basin was separate from the eastern basin, but with isostatic rebound in the eastern end, the water topped the Norfolk Moraine, creating one lake with a deep channel called the Pennsylvania Channel. An alternative may have been a significant inflow of water from the south shore tributaries, raising the water level, while deepening the Pennsylvania Channel, until a single lake was created.

== Middle Stage ==
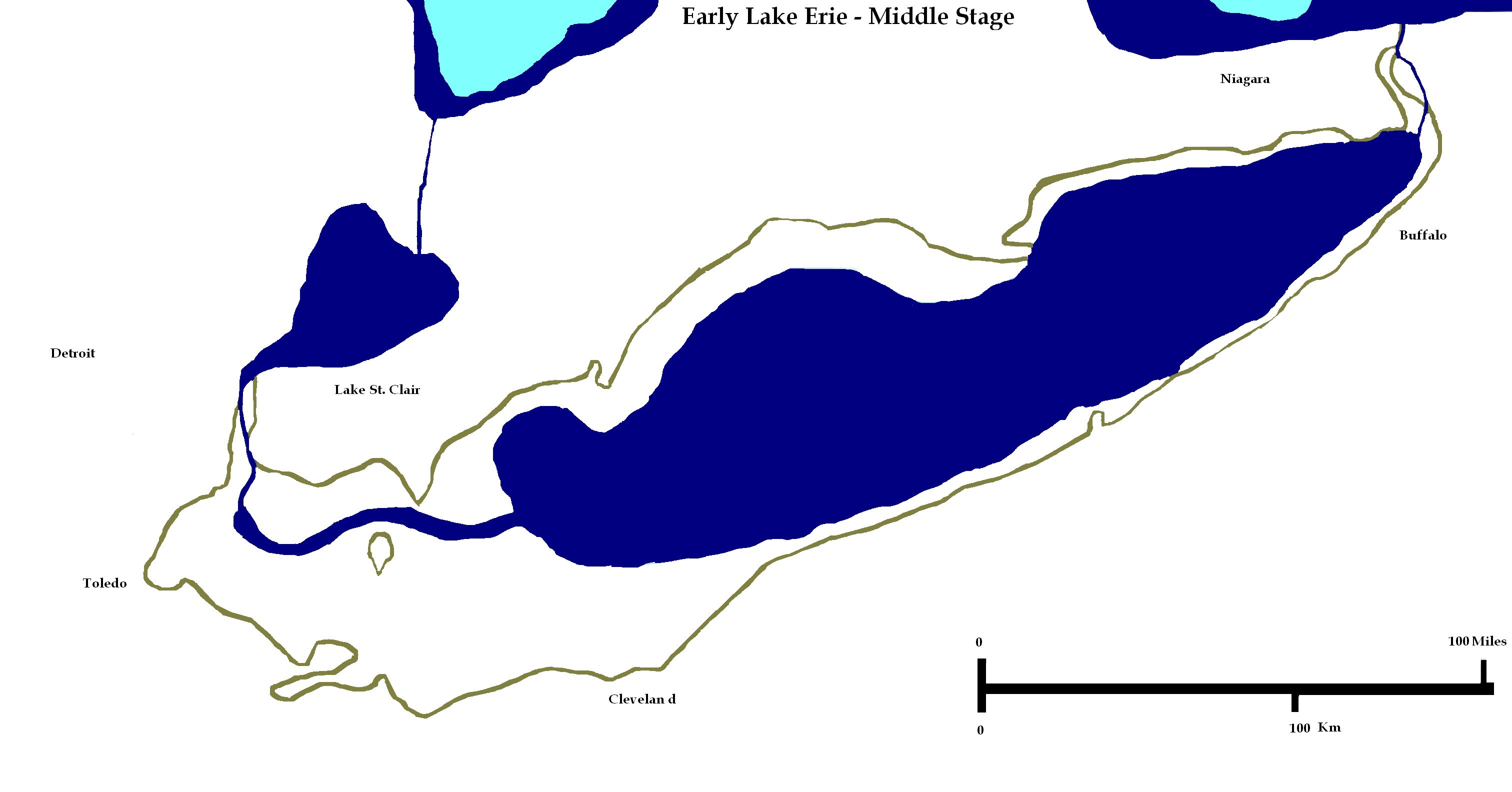
Middle Stage of Early Lake Erie. Based on Herdendorf, 2013. Blue is full extent of the prehistoric lake with light blue for those waters of Lake Huron over the modern lake area.

About 10,000 YBP the water levels began to level off. At 7,500 YBP the elevation was 145 metres (476 ft). It continued to rise, by slowing for the next 2,000 years. This period has been called the "Middle Lake Erie". This would be 25 metres (82 ft) below the current lake level. An alternative level at 30 metres (98 ft) has been proposed through radiocarbon dates.

It is believed that decreased precipitation and increased evaporation of set the changes created by the isostatic uplift.) This Xerothermic or Hypsithermal Interval existed for approximately 5,000 years (10,300 to 5,300 YBP). As the uplift continued, the North Bay Outlet rose, and the upper basin entered the stage of Lake Nipissing. This was 5,400 YBP. Lake Erie remained isolated, but continued to rise. The Middle Stage ended around 5,300 YBP when drainage from Lake Nipissing was again diverted through the Port Huron outlet. The increase in water, the growing humidity in the climate, and increased water levels created a large delta in western basin at the mouth of the ancestral Detroit River. The remaining depositional features in Lake Erie (i.e. the Buffalo Ridge, Norfolk Moraine, Conneaut Bank, and Presque Isle Bank) were flooded. These underwater obstacles altered water circulation patterns, forming new surface features, including Long Point, Ontario, and Presque Isle, Pennsylvania. The Lake St. Clair delta was formed during this time, (5,000-3,600 YBP). The lacustrine clays under the delta have been radiocarbon dated at 7,300 YBP. Thus the delta began during Lake Nipissing time

== Highstand ==
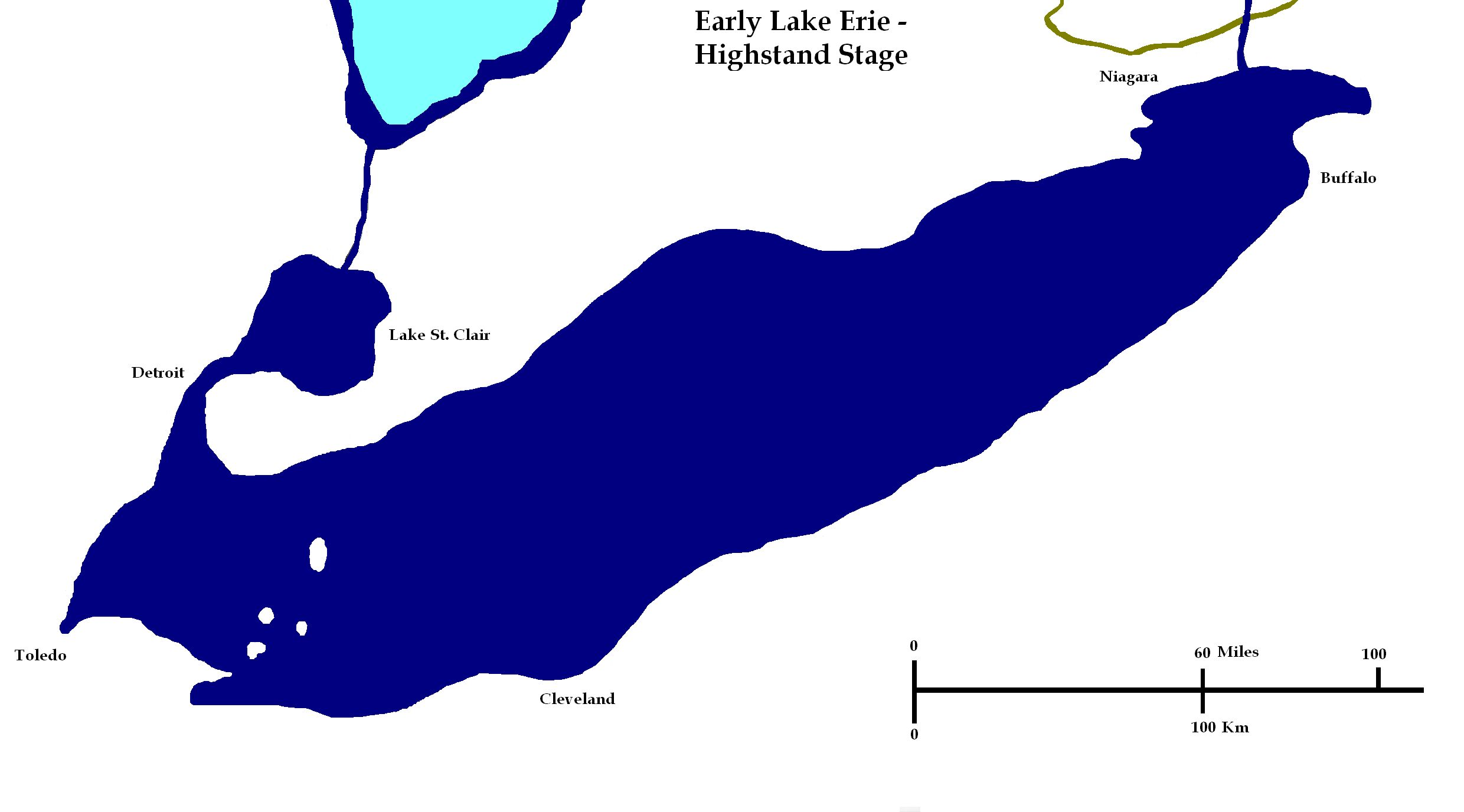
Highstand shore of Lake Erie. Based on Herondon 2013.

Shoreline features indicate Lake Erie rose to a highstand, 3 to 4 metres (9.8 to 13.1 ft) above its present level about 4,700 YPB. The Niagara River Outlet eroded to its current level about 3,500 YBP.

== Transition to modern Lake Erie ==
When Lake Erie reached its present level 3,500 YBP, the southern tributary river that had created incised channels through the lacustrine sediment and glacial till during the low-water stages was flooded. This created the drowned estuarine river mouths common along the western shore. These drowned shores became the source of beach sand, forming the massive sand spits at Long Point and Presque Isle, and creating new spits at Point Pelee, Ontario, and Cedar Point, Ohio. At the same time barrier beaches were formed across the mouths of most of the estuarine tributaries.

== See also ==
- Great Black Swamp
- Lake Whittlesey
- Champlain Sea
- Lake Ojibway
- Lake Algonquin
- Lake Agassiz
- Lake Chicago
- Lake Maumee
- Last glacial maximum
- Midcontinent Rift System
- Niagara Escarpment
- Nipissing Great Lakes
- List of prehistoric lakes

== External sources ==
- Lake Erie Landscapes
