= Lake Komi =

- Location within Russia
- Location: Komi Republic, Russia
- Coordinates: 66.3091°N 56.2020°E
- Type: prehistoric periglacial lake

Lake Komi was a prehistoric periglacial lake formed in the region of the present-day Russian Komi Republic when the Barents Sea outlet of the Pechora River was blocked by ice during, at least, Major glacial 4 of 4, of the Pleistocene. The latter was the last series of ice ages (glacials), which spans more than two million years.
