= Lake Frontenac =

- Location within Ontario Location within New York
- Location: North America
- Group: Great Lakes
- Coordinates: 43.58°N 77.19°W
- Lake type: former lake
- Etymology: Louis de Buade, Comte de Frontenac et de Palluau, Governor of New France, 1672-1682.
- Primary inflows: Laurentide Ice Sheet
- Basin countries: Canada; United States
- First flooded: 10,000 years before present
- Max. length: 194 mi (312 km)
- Max. width: 57 mi (92 km)
- Surface elevation: 244 ft (74 m)
- References: United States Geological Survey, George Otis Smith, Director; The Pleistocene of Indiana and Michigan and the History of the Great Lakes; Frank Leverett and Frank B. Taylor; Department of the Interior, Monographs of the United States Geological Survey; Volume LIII; Washington; Government Printing Office; 1915

Lake Frontenac was a proglacial lake in the basin of what is now Lake Ontario. The sudden influx of fresh water into the Atlantic, as the retreat of the Laurentian Glacier triggered a sudden drop in the lake's water level, may in turn have triggered the onset of the Younger Dryas, 1000-year period of renewed cooling approximately 12000 years ago.

When the retreating ice opened a passage eastward around the north side of the Adirondack Mountains to the basin of Lake Champlain, the lake level fell and the outlet at Rome was abandoned. At this stage the ice barrier or dam rested about on the Frontenac axis of the pre-Cambrian rocks and the lake may therefore be called Lake Frontenac.

== See also ==
- Glacial Lake Iroquois
- Admiralty Lake
