= Lake Palomas =

Ancient lake in New Mexico, United States and Chihuahua, Mexico

- Location within Mexico
- Coordinates: 31.22°N 106.99°W
- Type: Former lake
- Primary inflows: Río Casas Grandes, Río del Carmen, Mimbres River or Río Santa María
- Catchment area: 60,000 square kilometres (23,000 sq mi)
- Max. length: 130 miles (210 km)
- Max. width: 40 miles (64 km)
- Surface area: 3,500 square miles (9,100 km^{2})

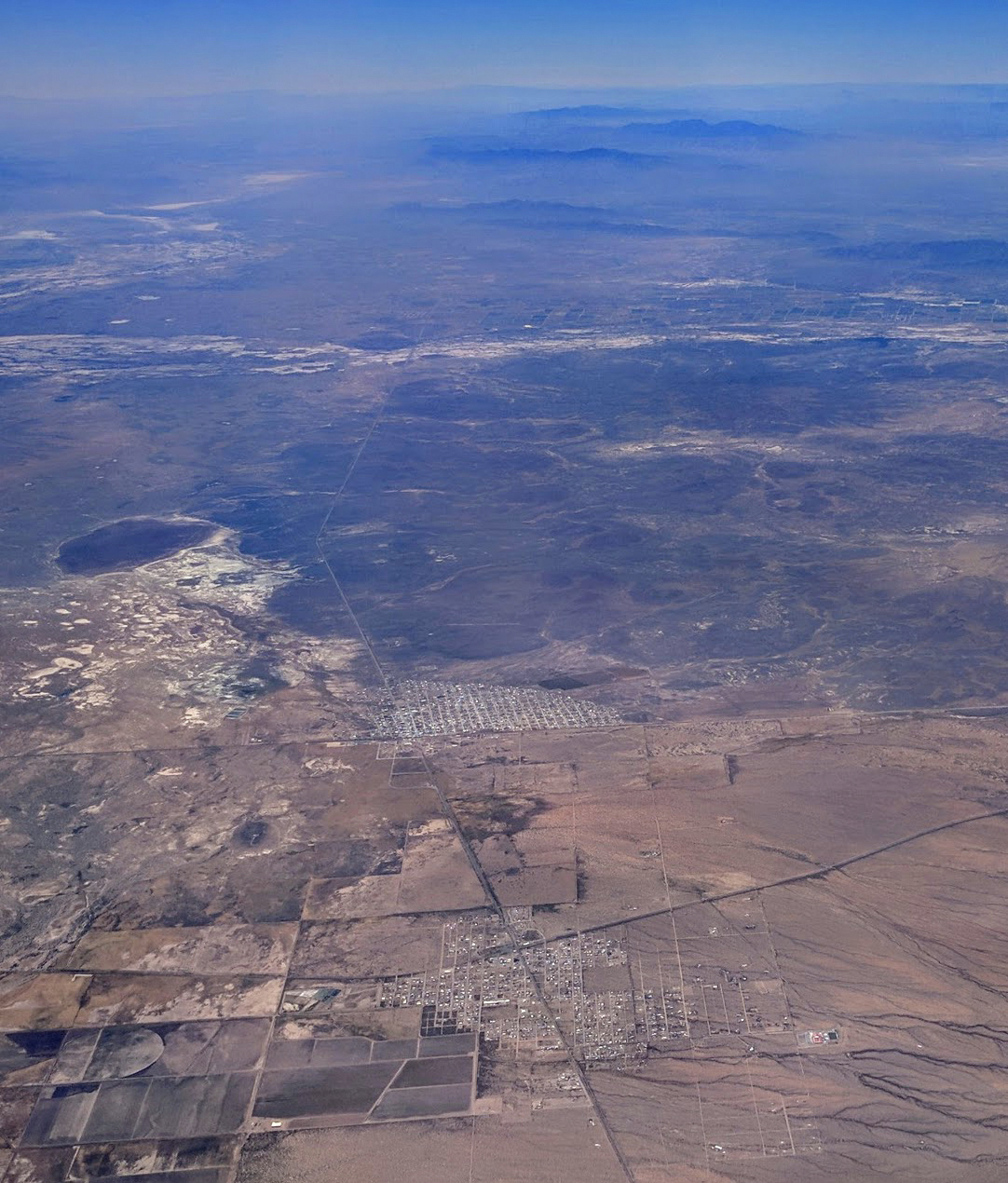
In this aerial photograph of the Guzmán Sink (northwestern) portion of the Lake Palomas area, looking over Columbus, New Mexico (foreground), Puerto Palomas, Chihuahua, is in the center, with its near edge defining the international border. The small terminal lake in the upper left is known as Laguna Palomas, and dry white playas are visible beyond it.

Lake Palomas is a former lake in New Mexico, United States, and Chihuahua, Mexico. This lake was relatively large and reached a size of about 9,100 square kilometres (3,500 mi^{2}) during its highstands. Preceded by Lake Cabeza de Vaca, it formed during the Pleistocene and continued into the Holocene, when several different lake phases occurred. Presently its basin is a major source of airborne dust in the region.

== Name ==
Lake Palomas is named after Puerto Palomas, Chihuahua. The northwestern part of the Lake Palomas basin is also known as "Guzmán Sink".

== Hydrogeography ==
During highstands the lake was about 210 kilometres (130 mi) long and in some places 64 kilometres (40 mi) wide. It covered a surface area possibly over 9,100 square kilometres (3,500 mi^{2}) during these highstands and 5,200 square kilometres (2,000 mi^{2}) at lowstands. At these sizes it was one of the largest pluvial lakes in the southwestern United States during the late Pleistocene. Most of the lake was located in Mexico, with only a bay between the West Potrillo Mountains and the Tres Hermanas Mountains extending into New Mexico.

At highstand, Lake Palomas contained the islands Unión and Santa María. The islands were 26 square kilometres (10 mi^{2}) and 650 square kilometres (250 mi^{2}), respectively. Islands were formed by the Carrizal Mountains, the Guzmán Mountains and the Las Muertos Mountains.

The lake was subdivided into three basins (east, central and west) by upthrust Cretaceous mountains and Tertiary intrusives. None of these basins were very deep during the history of Lake Palomas; the deepest point during La Mota time was in Salinas de Unión where the current basin floor is 120 metres (410 ft) beneath the La Mota shoreline.

Lake Palomas has left over sediments ranging from gravel and sand at its shores and clay and silt in the centres of the basins that formed the lake.

== Hydrology ==
=== Inflow ===
The Río Casas Grandes, Río del Carmen, Mimbres River or Río Santa María either drained into Lake Palomas or had part of their course submerged by it.

The catchment of Lake Palomas covered about 60,000 square kilometres (23,000 sq mi), and was fully developed by about 200,000 years ago.

=== Shorelines ===
Three different shorelines of Lake Palomas are known. These are the 1,200 metres (4,100 ft) La Mota, the 1,240 metres (4,070 ft) Guzmán and the Las Muertos at 1,230 metres (4,030 ft). The La Mota shorelines are noticeable on the northeastern side of the lake between Columbus, New Mexico, and Villa Ahumada, Chihuahua, where they are over 180 kilometres (110 mi). On the western side conversely, they are buried beneath alluvial deposits and thus difficult to recognize.

Lower shorelines are also found, though they are less well developed. These include the 1,220 metres (4,010 ft) El Sancho, the 1,236 metres (4,056 ft) Santa Maria shoreline and a mid-Holocene 1,190 metres (3,900 ft) shoreline. Three shorelines of Holocene age are found at 1,225 metres (4,019 ft), 1,200 metres (3,900 ft) and 1,175 metres (3,855 ft) elevation, they correspond to the early Holocene, middle Holocene and the Little Ice Age, respectively.

Shoreline features include beach ridges, river deltas, spits and wavecut platforms. After the shrinkage of Lake Palomas and its successor lakes, wind erosion has occurred on the shoreline deposits. The eroded particles formed the Samalayuca Dune Fields upon deposition.

== Climate ==
The present-day climate of the Lake Palomas area is cold in winter and hot in summer. Precipitation totals about 300 millimetres (12 in), with high elevation areas reaching twice to thrice as much as lowland. Precipitation falls mostly in summer; the winter precipitation is controlled by the El Nino-Southern Oscillation.

Lake levels at Lake Palomas were controlled by the position of the polar jet stream, which could drive storm systems into the region when it was positioned farther south. The increased cloud cover and lower temperatures reduced evaporation and the storms added precipitation to the basin, causing lake levels to increase. The North American Monsoon on the other hand does not appear to have played a major role in the lake history, seeing as lake levels of Lake Palomas are correlated to lake levels in basins such as Silver Lake that are not monsoonally influenced.

== Biology ==
Lake Palomas contained populations of bivalves and gastropods. Among the genera found in its deposits are Physa, Planorbella, Pyganodon and Succinea. The Rio Grande sucker spread through the Mimbres watershed.

The large size of Lake Palomas and its subsequent fragmentation had strong effects on the development of animal species inhabiting its basin, forming isolated clades. Cyprinodon pisteri, beautiful shiner, largemouth shiner and red shiner exist within the catchment of Lake Palomas and may have developed from a common ancestor that lived in the lake and its catchment. The fragmentation of Lake Palomas would have triggered the split into various species.

== History ==
Before Lake Palomas, an even larger lake existed in the area, Lake Cabeza de Vaca. Named after Álvar Núñez Cabeza de Vaca, this lake covered a surface area of 23,000–26,000 square kilometres (9,000–10,000 mi^{2}) in Chihuahua and New Mexico. It was nourished by the Rio Grande through the Mesilla Valley and its shores approximately followed the present-day 1,300 metres (4,250 ft) contours. Lake Palomas itself is considered to have formed 500,000 years ago.

The La Mota shoreline of Lake Palomas is approximately coeval with Lake Lahontan and Lake Bonneville, about 60,000 years before present. Previously obtained radiocarbon dates on the La Mota shoreline indicate ages of 27,150 ± 1,060 and 25,200 BC, which is young for such a high shoreline. Another highstand occurred beginning 21,000 years ago between 12,000 and 15,000 years ago.

Lake Palomas reformed during the early Holocene, covering a surface area of 5,650 square kilometres (2,180 sq mi) at that point. Other lakes in the region also show a highstand at that time, which at Lake Palomas is dated to 9,255 to 9,430 years ago.

Additional lake stands are recorded during the mid-Holocene, the Neoglacial and the Little Ice Age. These are dated to be 7,585 – 6,980, 4,795 – 4,220 and 495 – 230 years old before present, respectively. The reformation of the lake during these times was probably aided by its large catchment, seeing as other regional pluvial lakes do not frequently show lake stands at these timepoints. These lake stands are correlated with Bond events and glacier advances in New Mexico. The mid-Holocene stand is unusual as other evidence indicates a dry time period.

=== Present day ===
The Bolsón de Los Muertos is the largest present-day basin in the area of Lake Palomas. Other basins such as Guzmán playa, Indian Basin, Patos Playa, Sabinal Playa (also known as Laguna El Fresnal) and Santa María Playa presently cover the floor of Lake Palomas. During El Niño events these basins can flood, forming ephemeral lakes that last for weeks. During 2006, a hundred-year flood filled many of these basins until the following year.

The lake bed of Lake Palomas is a major source of airborne dust pollution in the Western Hemisphere, reaching as far as Canada. This dust is swept up by dry season storms and can heavily pollute El Paso and Ciudad Juárez. Other former lakebeds in the region also generate dust. The formation of this dust is facilitated by the texture of the clay and silt deposits, which are easily eroded by the wind in the flat land of the playas. Hazardous elements such as arsenic and lead are found in this dust.
