= Nipissing Great Lakes =

Prehistoric proglacial lake

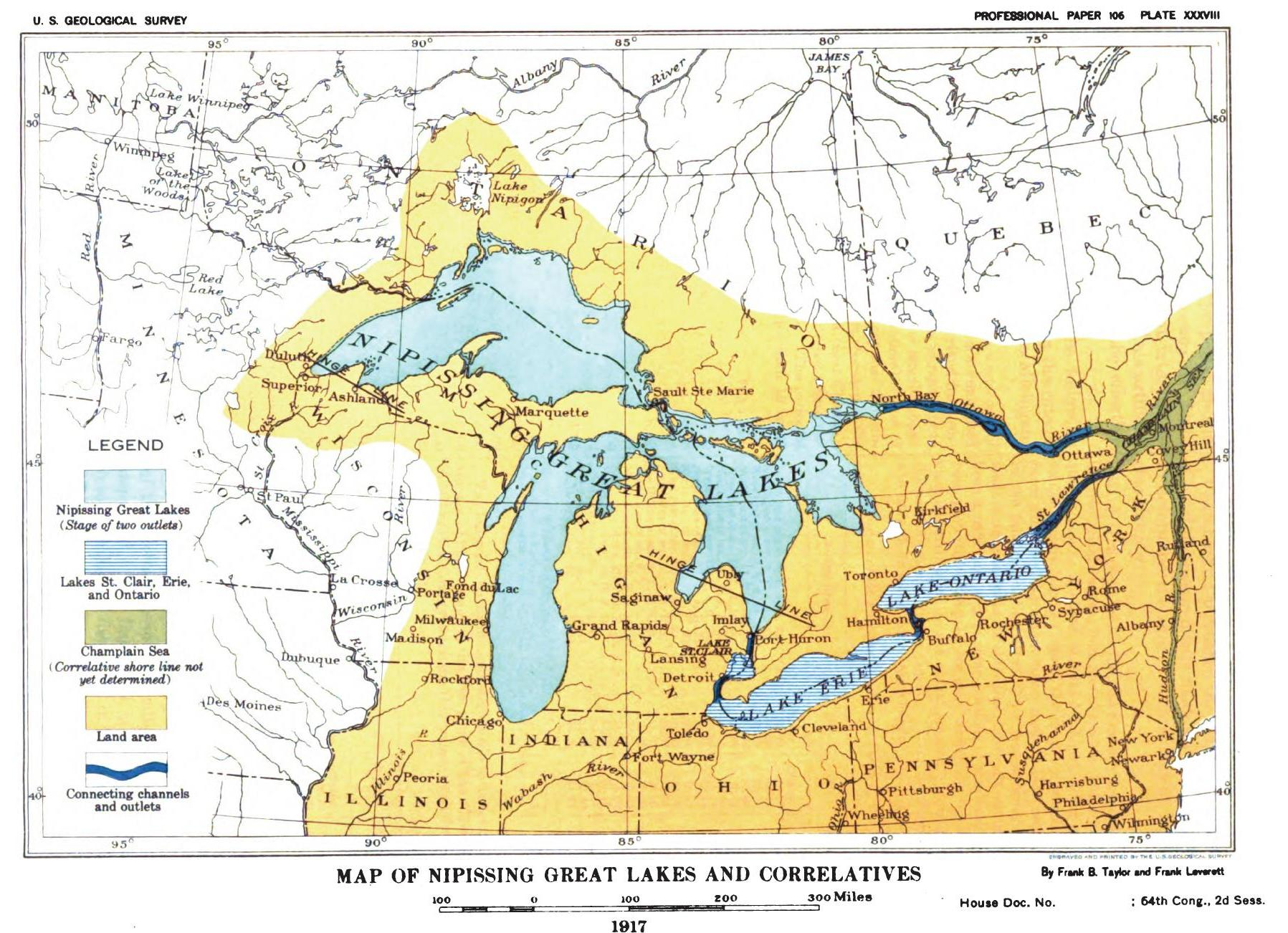
- Map of Nipissing Great Lakes from the U.S. Geological Survey monograph of 1915.

- Location within North America
- Location: North America
- Group: Great Lakes
- Coordinates: 45.8°N 84.72°W
- Lake type: former lake
- Primary inflows: Laurentide Ice Sheet
- Primary outflows: Ottawa River to the Mattawa River
- Basin countries: Canada; United States
- First flooded: 7,500 years before present
- Max. length: 241 mi (388 km)
- Max. width: 200 mi (320 km) to 300 mi (480 km)
- Max. depth: 595 mi (958 km) to 597 mi (961 km)
- Surface elevation: 580 mi (930 km)
- References: United States Geological Survey, George Otis Smith, Director; The Pleistocene of Indiana and Michigan and the History of the Great Lakes; Frank Leverett and Frank B. Taylor; Department of the Interior, Monographs of the United States Geological Survey; Volume LIII; Washington; Government Printing Office; 1915

Nipissing Great Lakes was a prehistoric proglacial lake. Parts of the former lake are now Lake Superior, Lake Huron, Georgian Bay and Lake Michigan. It formed about 7,500 years before present (YBP). The lake occupied the depression left by the Labradorian Glacier. This body of water drained eastward from Georgian Bay to the Ottawa valley. This was a period of isostatic rebound raising the outlet over time, until it opened the outlet through the St. Clair valley, at one stage it had two stable outlets (north and south) both draining to the east.

== Origin ==
The Lake formed from the aggregation of Glacial Lakes Houghton, Chippewa and Hough, and Stanley as water levels increased. Levels returned and Lake Chippewa again flowed through the canyon at Mackinac until around 7,500 YBP. At that time, the waters in the Michigan basin, Huron basin, and the Superior basin created a single lake encompassing all three of the upper Great Lakes. The lowlands through the rapids of Sault Ste. Marie and across the Upper Peninsula of Michigan were open bodies of water.

== Location and area ==
The term "Nipissing Great Lakes" is applied to the waters of the upper three Great Lakes during the stage. The glacier had receded completely from the Great Lakes Basin. The plural form is used to denote that each basin was a separate unit, with a narrow strait connecting each. Each basin stood at the same elevation and thus appear as a single body of water. Lake Michigan connected to Lake Huron by the Mackinac strait, except the water was 50 feet (15 m) higher. There was also a narrower, shallower channel Little Traverse Bay to Huron basin. The outlet of the lakes, however, was eastward from the northeast angle of Georgian Bay.

== Outlets ==
The North Bay Outlet was at North Bay, Ontario, the modern Lake Nipissing. As the ground continued to rebound from the weight of glacier, the Port Huron outlet began to again receive water, creating a temporary two-outlet lake.

=== 1st Ottawa & Mattawa River ===
The North Bay outlet river, (580 feet (180 m) above sea level) or " Nipissing-Mattawa River," crossed an area of crystalline rock, chiefly gneiss, reaching the Mattawa River, which joined the Ottawa River at Mattawa, which led out the St. Lawrence to the ocean. Mattawa River is a chain of lakes. Some of the lakes are long, narrow, and deep, lying in canyon-like valleys 200 feet (61 m) to 300 feet (91 m)wide, with water 100 feet (30 m) to 300 feet (91 m) deep. The canyons are 100 feet (30 m) or more high. A few places along this route show a scoured bed that would require a similar volume and velocity of water movement as St. Clair River today.

=== 2nd Detroit & Port Huron ===
In the early part of this closing two-outlet stage a small discharge went by way of Illinois River at Chicago. The basin there is only 8 feet (2.4 m) and the Nipissing beach is 15 feet (4.6 m) above the modern lake. The small discharge would have ended when the outlet at Port Huron had cut down 3 feet (0.91 m) or 4 feet (1.2 m).

== Beaches ==
The low water beaches were submerged through most of their range as the land rebounded. Thus, the known beaches of the Nipissing Great Lake are those formed during the period that the St. Clair valley served as the outlet. Only a few of the older beaches survive. Lake Nipissing, like Lake Algonquin, is reflected in the character of the channel in the Niagara Gorge. A part of the gorge at the whirlpool and a small section above and below it shows a shallow excavation both sides. This shallow excavation was made by a weak waterfall when the Erie basin was the main watershed feeding falls. Near the suspension bridges a deep excavation begins which extends up to the present cataract. This seems to have been created since the flow from Lake Nipissing turned into the St. Clair outlet, feeding water to Lake Erie. The rate of recession the falls would require between 2,700 and 3,500 years to make the deep part of the gorge.

Since the opening of the St. Clair outlet there has been continuous flow in the present direction, and the outlet has suffered a slight deepening which has lowered the lake level perhaps 14 feet (4.3 m). The beach at 596 feet (182 m) in the southern end of the Huron basin seems to have been occupied by Lake Nipissing as well as by the late stage of Lake Algonquin, so the lowering of the lake is from that height to the present. The present beach is 582 feet (177 m) to 584 feet (178 m) with a mean stage of water about 580 feet (180 m).

=== Nipissing Beach ===
The name "Nipissing beach" has from the first been applied to the shoreline formed during the two-outlet stage of the lakes. The name more precisely belongs to the older beach made by the Nipissing Great Lakes when the whole discharge passed through the Ottawa River. After the formation of the true Nipissing beach isostatic rebound elevated the region. This lowered the water plane on the north side of the basin and raised it on the south side. Thus the beach from the earlier stage of the Nipissing Great Lakes in the south was flooded and destroyed. Only the area in the northeast corner of Lake Superior still retains remnants of this first or original Nipissing beach. The point of elevation or the ‘hinge line’ for Nipissing beach is the same as the highest Algonquin beach. South of the line the Nipissing beaches are horizontal and vary between 14 and 16 feet (4.3 and 4.9 m) above the present lake level, the mean being 15 feet (4.6 m). In the south, the Algonquin beach and the Nipissing beach can be indistinguishable. Both are from 10 and 12 feet (3.0 and 3.7 m) below the Algonquin high beach. Where the Algonquin divides into several ridges, the Nipissing beach will be one these ridges. In the Superior basin where any considerable width of beach deposits intervenes between the Nipissing and the present shore it is likely to be occupied by rather light beach ridges set very close together, with the Nipissing beach as the uppermost. Where the Algonquin is represented by several ridges, the Algonquin beaches are heavier and less sandy (i.e., pebbly or gravelly) than the Nipissing. Along the east side of the Michigan ‘thumb’ the Nipissing beach has been cut away by the present lake. This is most noticeable along the east side of the "thumb" north of Port Huron, and on both sides of Lake Michigan, and on the east side of Lake Huron.

=== Beach remnants ===
A shallow bay between Port Huron and Lakeport has a faint Algonquin beach at its back and a stronger one a mile (2 km) farther west. Outside of these the Nipissing and lower beaches complete the filling of the old bay and bring the shore to a straight line. From Bay City northward to Saginaw, where the hinge line of the Algonquin and Nipissing beaches crosses the west shore of Saginaw Bay, the Nipissing beaches are sandy ridges 0.5 to 1 mile (0.80 to 1.61 km) from the lakeshore. A mile or two north of Alabaster the cliff back of the beach is 60 to 70 feet (18 to 21 m) high and the bench a quarter of a mile (half kilometer) wide. The beach is a wave-cut bench that carries ridges to the mouth of Tawas River. Through Tawas and East Tawas and beyond to Au Sable River it is a low, broad ridge of sand and gravel a half a mile to a mile wide. From East Tawas it lies generally about a mile (1.5 km) back from the shore.

== Altitude ==
In the Michigan and Huron basins the deformed portion of the Nipissing beach appears, as already stated to hinge on the same line as the Algonquin. South of the hinge line in both basins the Nipissing beach has an altitude of 595 feet (181 m)to 597 feet (182 m), the average being about 596 feet (182 m). The altitude of Lake Huron is taken as 581 feet (177 m).

== Correlatives ==
=== Lake St. Clair ===
During the time of the Nipissing Great Lakes Lake St. Clair was at low stage; in fact, it was almost if not wholly abandoned as a lake. Only a sluggish, relatively small stream with locally expanded ponds or swampy parts remained.

=== Lake Erie ===
Lake Erie was at low stage during the time of the Nipissing Great Lakes. Without the inflow from the upper lake basin, both Lake Erie and Niagara Falls would lack the volume of water needed to cut the channel through the Niagara limestone cap rock. Lake Erie was a nonglacial lake in this period. The third stage of nonglacial development ended the Lake Algonquin. A fourth stage was initiated when the upper lakes entered the Nipissing Great Lakes stage and that volume of water was diverted through the outlet at North Bay, Ontario. At this low stage, Lake Erie was 10 feet (3.0 m) to 12 feet (3.7 m) lower than present lake level and which lasted throughout the time of the Nipissing Great Lakes.

=== Champlain Sea ===
The Lake Algonquin period of lake development included drainage through the Algonquin River to Trenton, Lake Iroquois, Lake Frontenac, and Gilbert Gulf, which disappeared before the beginning of the Nipissing Great Lakes. It is not certain but that the Champlain Sea had nearly disappeared and all the uplift, except perhaps about 20 feet (6.1 m), had been accomplished. A heavily developed shore line, called the Micmac beach, extends for 200 miles (320 km)below Quebec along the south side of the lower St. Lawrence. It is strong and continuous between Quebec and Ste. Anne de Beaupre. It is 20 feet (6.1 m) above the level of the Gulf of St. Lawrence and is horizontal. Wave action at this level was evidently powerful and prolonged, for the sea cliff is in places 100 feet (30 m)high, cut in shale, and the wave-cut bench is unusually wide.

== See also ==
- Lake Agassiz
- Lake Maumee
