= Lake Tengger =

Lake in China

Coordinates: 39.05°N 103.67°E

Lake Tengger (also known as Lake Zhuyeze) is a paleolake in China. It formed within the Tengger Desert during the Pleistocene and in reduced form during the Holocene as well. It is not certain when it existed.

== Hydrology ==
Lake Tengger was a moderately deep (20–60 metres (66–197 ft)) lake. At a water level elevation of 1,310 metres (4,300 ft) it would have been about four times larger than China's present-day largest inland lake, Lake Qinghai, covering a surface of 16,000 square kilometres (6,200 sq mi). Overall, during the late Pleistocene lake levels alternated between 1,310–1,321 metres (4,298–4,334 ft) above sea level. Beach deposits and cliffs developed at its margins, the former of which in part show up as dark bars in Landsat imagery.

Waters ranged from fresh to mesohaline and were resupplied by precipitation and from neighbouring mountains, with the Shiyang He being a principal river flowing into the lake. The formation of this lake was directed by a climate very different from the one that can be observed today.

== Geography ==
Lake Tengger formed in northwestern China, northwest of Lanzhou, in Inner Mongolia and the Gansu Province. It is located in the Tengger Desert, which is the fourth largest desert in China and covers a surface of 36,000 square kilometres (14,000 sq mi), containing sand dunes. Presently, average temperatures amount to 9.5 °C (49.1 °F) and rainfall to 115 millimetres per year (4.5 in/year); vegetation exists mainly in places where groundwater is not deep beneath the surface and consists of grasses and shrubs. The precipitation is mainly brought by the East Asian Monsoon in summer.

Geologically, the area is covered by sediments of Quaternary age and sedimentary rocks of Mesozoic-Tertiary age, with outcrops of Precambrian-Paleozoic age in mountains. The Shiyang River after a steep descent over tectonically tilted terrain flows into the Tengger Desert and enters into lake Baijian Hu. The average runoff of the Shiyang River is 1.47 cubic kilometres per year (47 m^{3}/s); water is withdrawn for irrigation purposes and this has reduced river discharge in the Tengger Desert, causing lakes to dry up.

== Biology ==
A number of ostracods inhabited Lake Tengger or its margins, such as Candona candida, Candona compressa, Cyprideis torosa, Darwinula stevensoni, Eucypris, Heterocypris salina, Iiyocypris gibba and Limnocythere inopinata.

Animals found within fluvial fans and terraces at the edge of Lake Tengger are Corbicula fluminea, Corbicula largillierti and Gyraulus chinensis. Furthermore, archeological relics have been found on the shores of the Holocene lakes, including ceramics and arrowhead microliths.

Vegetation around the lake included Cupressaceae, Larix, Picea, Populus and Quercus. Such vegetation occurred in particular on Yabulai Mountain in the western portion of the Tengger Desert; today no vegetation occurs there and only desert species at lower elevations.

== History ==
The chronology of the lake has seen different dating proposals, owing to uncertainties in dating methods. The highest stand of the lake took place during marine isotope stage 5 (MIS5), with smaller highstands during MIS3 and the Holocene. According to earlier reports, the lake first appeared between 40,000 - 42,000 years before present and reached maximum size between 35,000 and 22,000 years before present, all in C14 dates.

According to this theory, Lake Tengger formed together with other lakes in the Badanjilin Desert and the Qilian Mountains between 35,000 - 22,000 years before present. At that time Lake Tengger would have reached its highest stand, the eastern part of the Tengger Desert was covered with smaller lakes. At the same time as Lake Tengger reached maximum levels, lake levels rose also in Tibet and northern Xinjiang. The formation of these lakes in the lowlands has been explained with the glacial climate, which reduced evaporation without decisively lowering temperatures and increased meridional temperature gradients which resulted in stronger baroclinic storms. Later, it is possible that a weakening of the East Asian Monsoon caused the lakes to dry up during full glacial conditions.

Later obtained optically stimulated luminescence dates have however shown that maximum lake levels occurred between 100,000 - 70,000 years before present. Radiocarbon dates implying younger ages may be due to contamination with younger carbon and/or the fact that the dates obtained are fairly borderline for radiocarbon dating precision.

Lake Tengger shrank or disappeared somewhere before the Last Glacial Maximum, seeing as no lakes existed during that time in the desert. After 12,000 years before present lakes developed anew in the Tengger Desert. Lakes also formed during the Holocene, but they covered smaller surface areas and their positions were variable. There are again uncertainties in the dates, also because different areas in the whole East Asia domain appear to have wet periods at separate times; it is possible that different meteorological mechanisms controlled precipitation in different regions.

Changes in summer insolation over the course of the Holocene mediated a weakening of the monsoon and drying of the Tengger Desert after about 5,000 years before present. Particular dry periods at Lake Tengger took place 7,100-5,000, 3,400-2,400 and 1,900-1,200 years ago. A 240 square kilometres (93 sq mi) large lake may have persisted until the Han Dynasty, and only began to shrink during the Qing Dynasty. Some researchers believe that human action rather than climate change precipitated the terminal desiccation of the lake. The present-day Baijian Hu lake is a salt swamp, and other playas and salt lakes are found in the region.
