= St. Joseph River (Michigan) =

St. Joseph River may refer to the following streams in the U.S. state of Michigan:

- St. Joseph River (Lake Michigan), rises in Hillsdale County and flows primarily to the west into Lake Michigan
- St. Joseph River (Maumee River), rises in Hillsdale County and flows primarily southwest, joins with the St. Mary's River in Ft. Wayne, Indiana to form the Maumee River
