= Lake Peace =

Lake in Canada

Lake Peace was a post ice-age glacial lake in what is now the Peace River basin in northeastern British Columbia and northwestern Alberta.

It formed approximately 14,000 BCE, after the Last Glacial Maximum, as the Laurentide Ice Sheet and Cordilleran Ice Sheet began to melt and retreat, and may have played an important role as an easily navigatable section of an inland human migration route from Asia to the Americas.

It remains unclear how long the lake lasted, or if it was drained in a glacial lake outburst flood, similar to the Missoula Floods that occurred on the southern margins of these same ice sheets.

== See also ==
- List of lakes of British Columbia
- List of prehistoric lakes
