= Periglacial lake =

Lake bordering a glacier or ice sheet

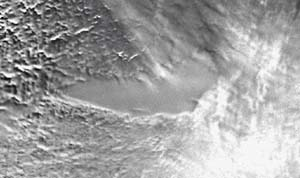
Subglacial Lake Vostok, Antarctica. Via NASA Goddard Space Flight Center.

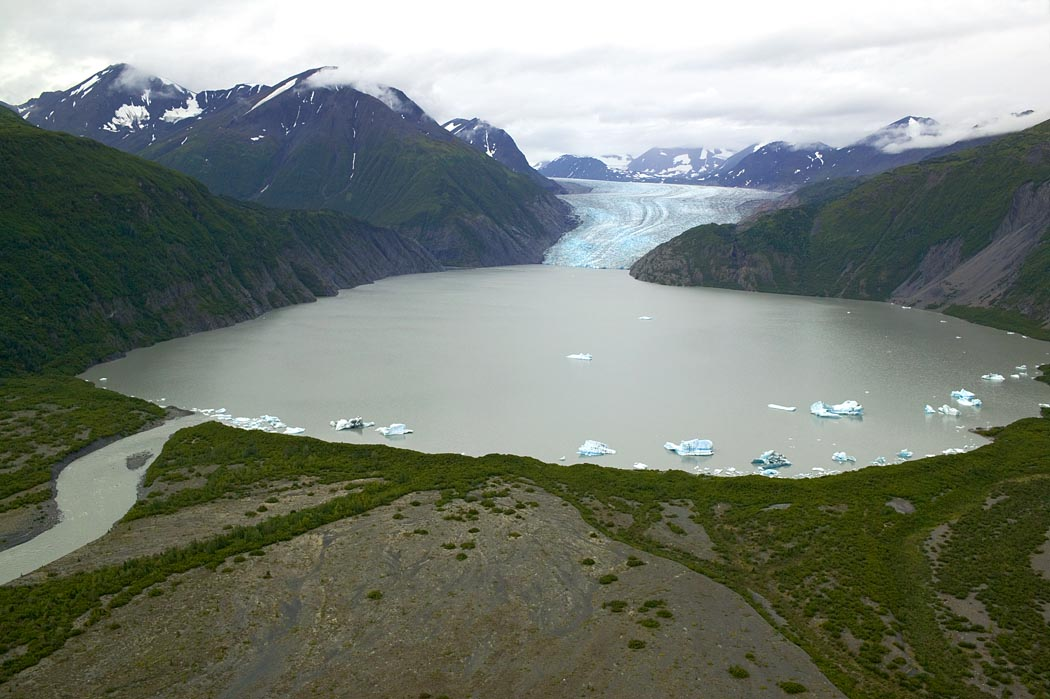
Glacial Lake in Kenai Fjord National Park, Alaska.

A periglacial lake is a lake bordering a glacier, usually found along the fringes of large ice sheets.

== Periglacial Zone ==
Periglaciation suggests an environment located on the margin of past glaciers. It has also been attributed to a climate with a tundra-like vegetation with a permanently frozen subsoil. Usually, the term is taken in the latter sense, but periglacial is used in the former definition when discussing periglacial lakes.

Freeze and thaw cycles influence landscapes outside areas of past glaciation. Therefore, periglacial environments are anywhere that freezing and thawing modify the landscape in a significant manner. The tundra climate or periglacial zone is just outside of glaciated areas. The processes of erosion in these glacial-peripheral zones are markedly different than present processes, therefore their effects have been noted. Areas that are too dry for glaciation to occur but that display characteristics of oversteepened slopes, solifluction slumps and cirques indicate the presence of a periglacial zone. Chief actions in these zones include solifluction and frost-shattering processes, the effects of which can be seen in the south of the Bristol Channel.

== Occurrence of Periglacial Lakes through Geologic Time ==
Former periglacial lakes are known to have existed as early as the Cryogenian period, though many were also formed in the Pleistocene period. Environments that have supported a periglacial zone or tundra climate include Siberia, Canada, Greenland, and southern Africa. The Pleistocene period is responsible for most of the known periglacial features in Britain.

== Formation of Landforms in Glaciated Highlands ==
Several landforms are formed in glaciated areas as the ice sheet moves between advancing when additional ice is introduced to the environment and receding due to ablation. Some landforms could be considered cases of superimposed drainage.

== See also ==
- Deglaciation – Transition from full glacial conditions during ice ages to warm interglacial conditions
- Periglaciation – Natural processes associated with freezing and thawing in regions close to glaciers
- Pingo – Mound of earth-covered ice
- Thermokarst – Irregular land surface of marshy hollows and small hummocks formed when permafrost thaws
