= Tyrrell Sea =

Prehistoric sea covering Hudson Bay

The Tyrrell Sea, named after Canadian geologist Joseph Tyrrell, is another name for prehistoric Hudson Bay. It existed during the retreat of the Laurentide Ice Sheet.

Roughly 8,000 years BP, the Laurentide Ice Sheet thinned and split into two lobes, one centred over Quebec–Labrador, the other over Keewatin. This drained Glacial Lake Ojibway, a massive proglacial lake south of the ice sheet, leading to the formation of the early Tyrrell Sea. The weight of the ice had isostatically depressed the surface as much as 270–280 m (890–920 ft) below its current level, making the Tyrrell Sea much larger than modern Hudson Bay. Indeed, in some places the shoreline was 100 to 250 km (62 to 155 mi) further inland than at present. It was at its largest roughly 7,000 years BP.

Isostatic uplift proceeded rapidly after the retreat of the ice, as much as .09 m (0.30 ft) per year, causing the margins of the sea to regress quickly towards its present margins. The rate of uplift decreased with time however, and in any event was nearly matched by sea level rise from the melting ice sheets. When the Tyrrell Sea "became" Hudson Bay is difficult to define, as Hudson Bay is still shrinking from isostatic rebound.
