= Lake Thompson (California) =

Coordinates: 34.82°N 117.94°W

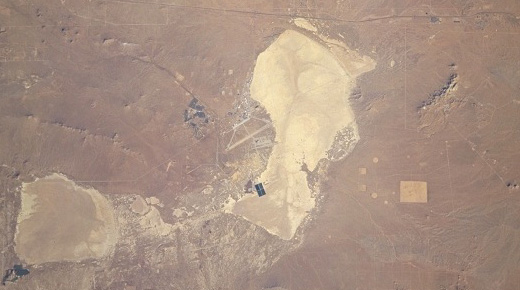
- Rogers Lake and Rosamond Lake; most of the terrain on this image was formerly covered by Lake Thompson
- Interactive map of Lake Thompson
- Type: Dry lake
- Catchment area: 5,633 km^{2} (2,175 sq mi)
- Basin countries: United States
- Surface area: 950 square kilometres (370 sq mi)
- Max. depth: 70 metres (230 ft)

Lake Thompson is a former lake in California. The name is derived from an academic who first speculated on the possibility that a lake existed in lower Antelope Valley. It occupied the area of the lower Antelope Valley and of the lakes Rogers Lake and Rosamond Lake during the Pleistocene. It dried up during the Holocene.

== Context ==
During the Pleistocene, a number of lakes formed in the deserts of North America. These include Lake Bonneville in Utah, Lake Lahontan in Nevada, and a cascade of lakes after Owens Lake, Lake Mojave and Lake Manly in California. Their formation was directed by cold periods of the Last Glacial Maximum and other climate oscillations such as the Younger Dryas that reduced evaporation in the deserts, as well as storm tracks that were displaced south by the continental ice sheets.

== The lake ==
Lake Thompson was kidney shaped and covered a surface of 950 square kilometres (370 sq mi) (at first it was believed to have covered a surface of 518 square kilometres (200 sq mi)). It developed in the westernmost Mojave Desert, covering much of the Antelope Valley to elevations of 710 m (2,330 ft), with additional shorelines suggested at elevations of 732 m (2,402 ft). Two islands existed in the water body, cliffs have been cut at some sites along its former shore, and there are dunes as well.

Stickleback fish may have entered the lake through Peninsular Ranges drainages and animals including snails, fish, amphibians, reptiles, birds, and mammoths have been found in lake sediments.

Present-day Boron, California; Kramer, California; Lancaster, California; and Rosamond, California lie in the bed of the former lake. Urbanization along with the growth of alluvial fans has buried the shores of the former lake at many sites.

== Hydrology ==
The catchment of Lake Thompson covers a surface area of 5,633 km^{2} (2,175 sq mi) and is bordered by the San Gabriel Mountains to the south and the Tehachapi Mountains in the west. Several creeks (such as Little Rock Creek) descending from the mountains nourished the lake. The lake had a number of tributaries.

When waters reached an elevation of 710 m (2,330 ft), the maximum depth of the lake would have been about 70 metres (230 ft) based on borehole data. It is possible that Lake Thompson overflowed northwards, into the Fremont Valley; presently, the sill that water would have to flow over is too high for spilling of a 710 metres (2,330 ft) lake to occur, but later sedimentation may have raised the sill. An overflow eastward close to Boron, California towards the Mojave River and/or Lake Harper is also possible but less likely.

== History ==
A number of lakes developed in the basin of Lake Thompson during the Cenozoic. Deep lakes existed around 36,000 and later as well as 16,200 - 12,600 years ago, with shallower lakebodies around 26,000 - 21,000 years ago, and desiccation between 21,000 - 16,200 years ago as well as during the Holocene. A further lake level increase may have occurred 7,700 years ago.

The lake does not exist anymore, owing to a drier present-day climate, although parts of its former bed can flood during wet winters. Rogers Lake, Rosamond Lake, and Buckskin Lake are located on the bed of former Lake Thompson. The rest of the lakebed is covered with lacustrine sediments, although fluvial and aeolian sediments also cover parts of the lakefloor.
