= Lake Ojibway =

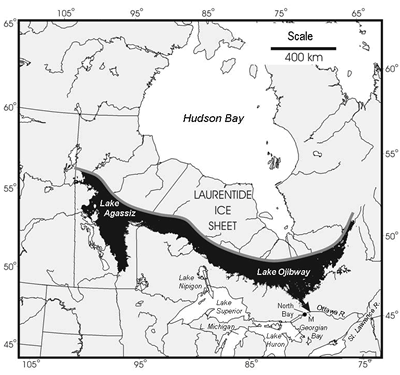
- Glacial Lake Agassiz and Lake Ojibway (7,900 YBP)

- Location within Ontario
- Location: Ontario & Quebec
- Coordinates: 48°N 80°W
- Lake type: former lake
- Etymology: Chippewa Nation
- Primary inflows: Laurentide Ice Sheet
- Primary outflows: Ottawa River valley
- Basin countries: Canada
- First flooded: 9,160 years before present
- Max. length: 1,314 mi (2,115 km)
- Max. width: 365 mi (587 km) 212 mi (341 km)
- Residence time: 1900 years in existence
- Surface elevation: 820 ft (250 m)
- References: Coleman, Arthur Philemon (1909). "Lake Ojibway; Last of the Great Glacial Lakes". Ontario Bureau of Mines. Report 18 (4): 284–293. Retrieved 30 October 2015.

Lake Ojibway was a prehistoric lake in what is now northern Ontario and Quebec. Ojibway was the last of the great proglacial lakes of the last ice age. The lake was named in 1909 by Canadian geologist Arthur Philemon Coleman after the Ojibway who occupied the proposed location of the lake. Comparable in size to Lake Agassiz (to which it was likely linked), and north of the Great Lakes, it was at its greatest extent c. 8,500 years BP. The former lakebed forms the modern Clay Belt, an area of fertile land.

Lake Ojibway was relatively short-lived. The lake likely drained approximately 8,200 years BP. One hypothesis is that a weakening ice dam separating it from Hudson Bay broke, as the lake was roughly 250 m (820 ft) above sea level. Recent studies assert Lake Ojibway drained in two separate events and through a combination of ice dam breach and subglacial flooding.

== Origins ==
Proglacial lakes existed across North America at the end of the Last Glacial Maximum during deglaciation. The retreating Laurentide Ice Sheet released meltwater that collected in vast water bodies during isostatic rebound, outlet sill incision, and ice damming. The temporary collection of water in proglacial lakes regulated the return of previously frozen water into the oceans. Lake Ojibway was located across the borders of what is now northwestern Quebec and northeastern Ontario within the Hudson Bay catchment area, and nearby Lake Barlow was within the southeastern Lake Timiskaming catchment. Lake Ojibway likely formed and drained sometime between ~10,500-8,200 BP when the Laurentide Ice Sheet retreat entered north-flowing catchment areas.

Studies often presume that Lake Ojibway and Lake Agassiz existed during the same time period and merged during the late stages of the lakes, however there is little geomorphological evidence for the latter. An assessment done in 1909 by Canadian geologist Arthur Philemon Coleman proposed both the location and existent timeline of Lake Ojibway. Coleman believed that Lake Agissiz completely drained before the formation of Lake Ojibway. As the Laurentide Ice Sheet retreat moved northward, it eventually entered into the Hudson Bay catchment area in which water drains northward into the North Atlantic. The meltwater was still blocked by the ice, forcing the formation of proglacial Lake Ojibway. Coleman's report, which was submitted to the Ontario Bureau of Mines, may have been accurate in describing the approximate location and extent of Lake Ojibway, but the timeline in relation to other proglacial lakes does not reflect the current literature. Starting in the 1920's glacial varve records provided a more accurate chronology for the proglacial lakes of North America.

== Paleohydrological evidence ==
Paleohydrologists measure glacial varves, which are the annual changes in sedimentation from lakes in proximity to glaciers or ice sheets, as they will accumulate finer sediments in the winter and coarser sediments in the summer. The thickness of the varves and geochemical analyses can provide information on the evolution of the lakes and nearby glacial activity. Varves between locations can be correlated and amalgamated to validate and create a complete sedimentary record. Geomorphological residual structures such as eskers, morraines and terraces corroborate the glacial varve evidence.

An extensive varve record from Lake Ojibway was produced by Swedish geologist Ernst Antevs in the 1920's. Antevs is responsible for the vast majority of glacial varve records in eastern Canada and New England and used his results from across these regions to construct one of the first chronologies for deglaciation.

=== Cochrane readvance ===
The Lake Ojibway glacial varves provides evidence of the Cochrane readvance. This occurred when the Laurentide Ice Sheet temporarily reversed its retreat and moved southward. The time period of the Cochrane readvance is debated. One record points to the event lasting for a period of approximately 200 years beginning in ~8,800 cal y BP. Another says the Cochrane readvance occurred approximately 310 years before the draining of Lake Ojibway. The varve evidence from Lake Ojibway is coarser sediments and indications of water level lowering in the lake ~300 years before it is believed to have drained.

=== 8.2-kiloyear event ===
A combination of geomorphology and varve records show that Lake Ojibway had two distinct drainage periods: first subglacially ~8,220 cal y BP followed by the ice dam rupture causing terminal drainage at ~8,160 cal y BP. The draining of Lake Ojibway is a possible cause of the 8.2-kiloyear event. The theory is the influx of cold freshwater from the glacial lakes into the North Atlantic caused a slowdown of oceanic thermohaline circulation which caused a global cooling period. However, more evidence is needed to support this theory since it is doubted that the combination of ice sheet melt and proglacial lake drainage was enough influx of freshwater to have such a widespread impact on global climate. On the other hand, if the draining of Lake Ojibway did trigger the 8.2-kiloyear event, it suggests that relatively small changes can cause major impacts to the North Atlantic and potentially Earth's global systems.

== Current uses ==
The area which was occupied by proglacial Lake Ojibway is now known as the northern Clay Belt. It stretches from the Cochrane District in Ontario to Abitibi in Quebec. The remnants of the lake bed formed the basis of fertile clay soils which have not been extensively exploited for agriculture. In 1961, only 3% of the land was being used for farm land. However, farming is moving northward, and the Ontario government has opened the area up to potential cattle farming. Recent soil studies aim to anticipate the effects of converting boreal forest land on clay soils to pasture and hay planting.

Nature Conservancy of Canada is working to designate a 1,450 km^{2} section of the Clay Belt as a land conservation project, citing numerous at-risk species which inhabit the area.

== See also ==
- Tyrrell Sea
- Glacial lake outburst flood
- Midcontinent Rift System
- List of prehistoric lakes
