= Lake Admiralty =

- Location within Great Lakes Location within New York Location within Ontario
- Location: North America
- Group: Great Lakes
- Coordinates: 43.582°N 77.32°W
- Lake type: former lake
- Etymology: Admiralty
- Primary inflows: Laurentide Ice Sheet
- Primary outflows: Mohawk River to the Hudson River
- Basin countries: Canada; United States
- First flooded: 12,000 years before present
- Max. length: 241 mi (388 km)
- Max. width: 57 mi (92 km)
- Residence time: 7300 years in existence
- Surface elevation: 178 ft (54 m)
- References: Lewis CFM, Cameron GDM, Anderson TW, Heil CW Jr, Gareau PL. 2012. Lake levels in the Erie Basin of the Laurentian Great Lakes. Journal of Paleolimnology 47:493-511.

Admiralty Lake was a proglacial lake in the basin of what is now Lake Ontario. The shoreline of Admiralty Lake was about 20 metres (66 ft) lower than Lake Ontario. The shoreline of Glacial Lake Iroquois, an earlier proglacial lake, was much higher than Lake Ontario's, because a lobe of the Laurentian Glacier blocked what is now the valley of the St Lawrence River. Lake Iroquois drained over the Niagara Escarpment, and down the Mohawk River. When the lobe of the glacier retreated the weight of the glacier kept the outlet of the St Lawrence River lower than the current level. As the glacier continued to retreat the region of the Thousand Islands rebounded, and the lake filled to its current level.

== Bibliography ==
- "Nearshore Geology". Aquatichabitat.ca. Archived from the original on 2012-01-27.
- J Terasmae, E Mirynech (1964). "Postglacial chronology and the origin of deep lake basins in Prince Edward County, Ontario". Conference on Great Lakes Research, 1964 - International Association for Great Lakes Research.
