= North Bay Outlet =

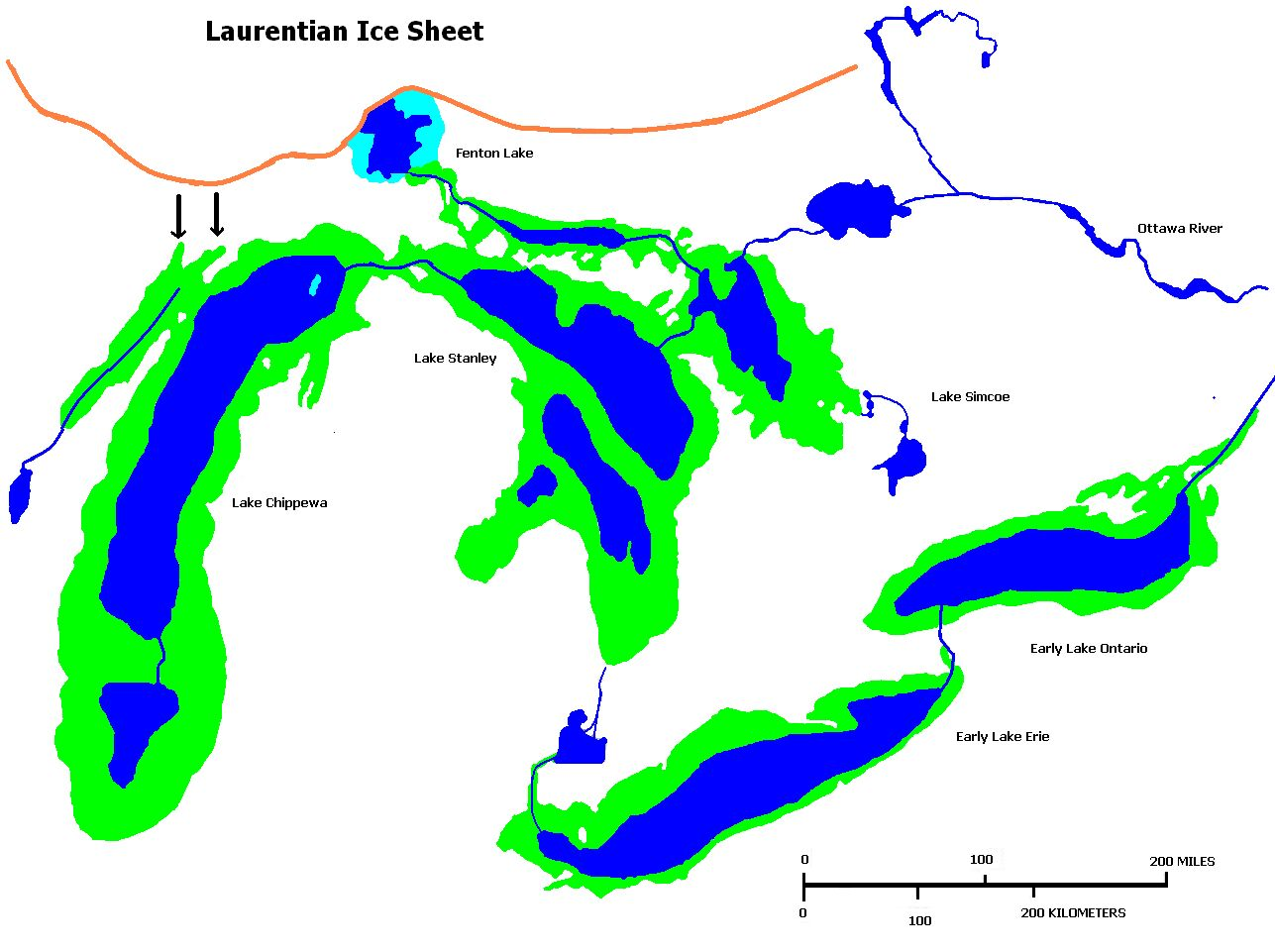
The outlet in the NE corner of this map, the North Bay Outlet, passes near the current site of North Bay Ontario.

The North Bay Outlet was an outlet of a proglacial lake that preceded present day Lake Huron, where it discharged its waters near present-day North Bay, rather than a more southerly route, as the Laurentian glaciation receded. Water drained down this route from approximately 10000 to 4500 bpe.

Glacial rebound raised the land around the outlet, leading to increased water levels in the lake, and finally the lake water finding a lower outlet.
