= Samalayuca Dune Fields =

Sand dune fields in Chihuahua, Mexico

Samalayuca Dune Field
- Médanos de Samalayuca
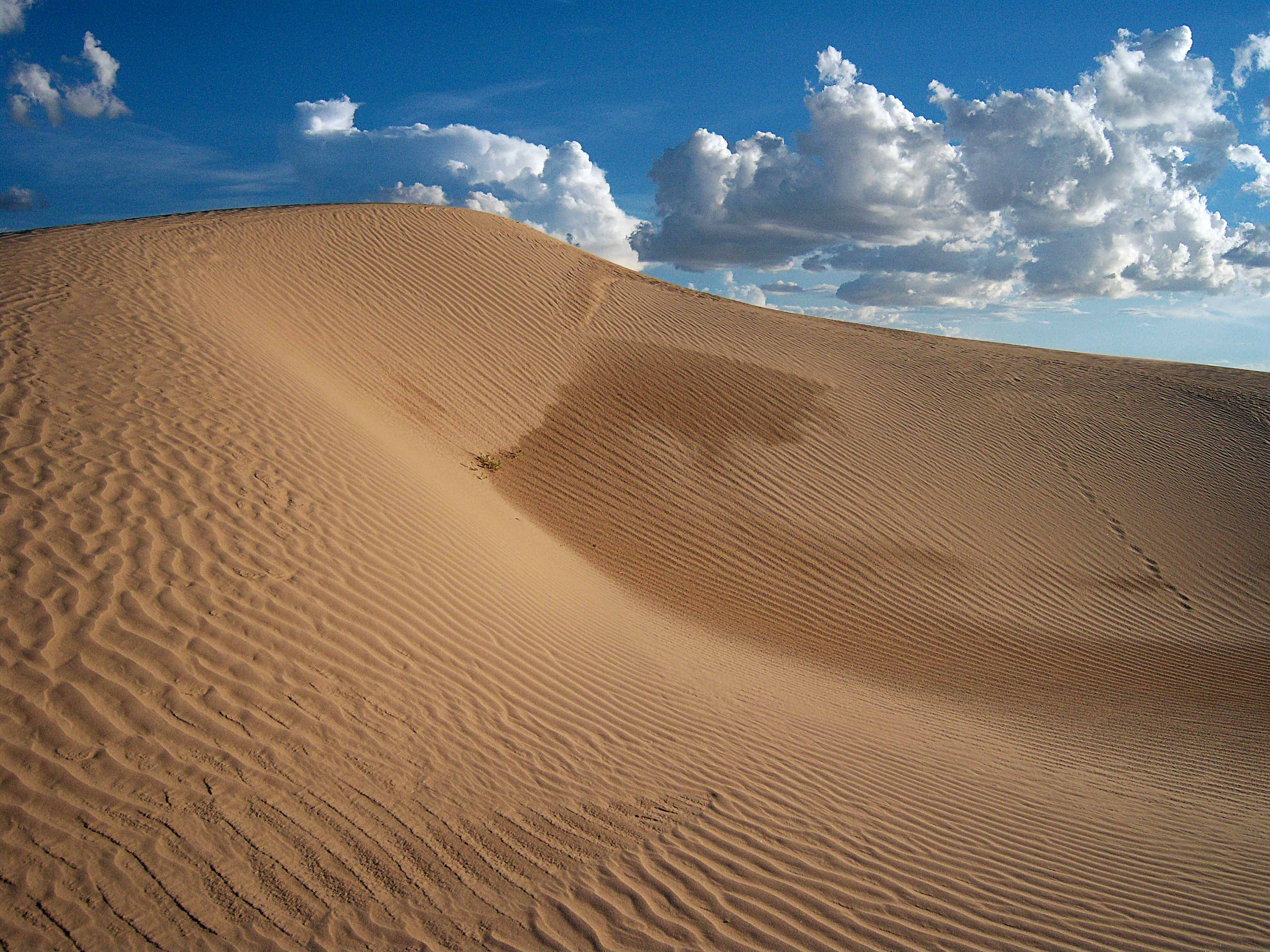
- View of the Médanos de Samalayuca near Samalayuca, Chihuahua.

Highest point
- Elevation: 3,872 ft (1,180 m)
- Coordinates: 31°08′24″N 106°54′00″W

Geography
- Location within Mexico Location within Chihuahua
- Location: Chihuahuan Desert, Chihuahua (state), Mexico

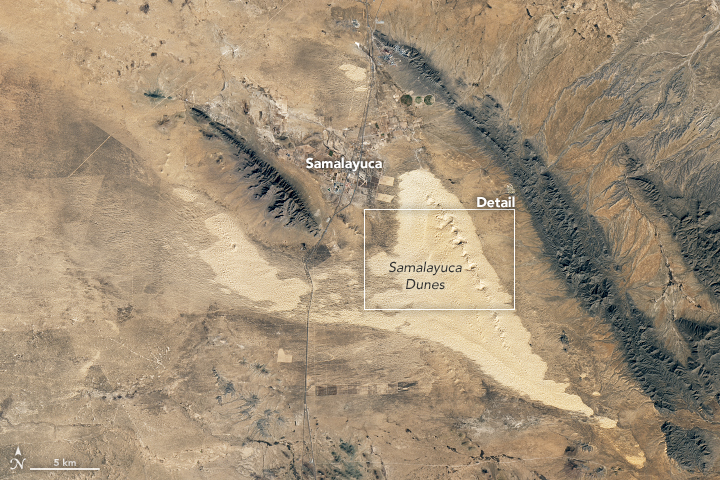
Samalayuca Dune field, 2018. See detail image, below. Scale bar is 5 km.

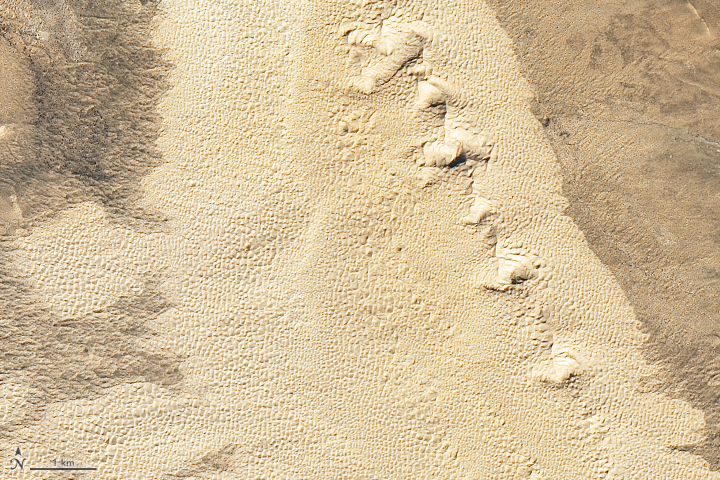
Samalayuca dunes detail. Scale bar (lower left) is 1 km.

The Samalayuca Dune Fields, more traditionally known as Los Médanos (the dunes), or more recently referenced as Médanos de Samalayuca, are a series of large but separated fields of sand dunes located in the northern part of the Mexican state of Chihuahua. The dune fields are scattered over a wide expanse of desert to the south, southwest and southeast of Ciudad Juárez. The dune fields are located in a 2000 km^{2} area known as the Samalayuca Desert.

The Samalayuca Desert and its dune fields are part of the much larger Chihuahua Desert region.

The best known portion of the Samalayuca Dune Fields lie in and around the village of Samalayuca. These dune fields lay across the much traveled north–south route between Chihuahua City and "The Pass of the North" at the site of the border cities of Ciudad Juárez and El Paso. Before the era of the modern highway and railroad, travel by foot, horse or oxen across this extended barrier of some 30 kilometers of loose sand was laborious and dangerous, but travelers had the option of a longer (and thus more time-consuming) detour around the east side of the dune fields. This portion of the dunes is also the most dramatic, having high dune profiles shaped by the wind in the lee of Cerro de Samalayuca.

The dunes are composed of almost pure quartz sand that is white to tan in appearance and formed by Aeolian deposition.

Today the dune fields are becoming known for their tourist and recreational potential, and as a habitat for the many unique endemic species of plants and animals living in a rare ecosystem in the Samalayuca desert. The high silica content of the sands has also attracted industrial interest.

== Name ==
=== Historical name ===
The sand dune area has traditionally been referred to as "Los Médanos" or simply, the dunes. The name Samalayuca Dune Fields is of more recent origin. The name "Los Médanos" is more commonly used, particularly in historical accounts. Recently, the dune fields have been increasingly referred to even by non-Spanish speakers as Médanos de Samalayuca.

=== Name origin ===
The field and the desert gets its name from the town of Samalayuca, Chihuahua. There are historic springs in the area, which accounts for the location of the town. The town is adjacent to the dramatic high dunes that lie some 52 km directly south of Ciudad Juárez just east of Mexican Federal Highway 45. These high dunes are formed by the prevailing winds from the northwest dropping sands in the lee of Cerro de Samalayuca (Samalayuca Peak), which lies close to Samalayuca village.

== Location ==
The most dramatic portion of the Samalayuca dune fields lie east and west of Mexican Federal Highway 45 and the parallel Mexican Railway in an area 30 to 60 miles south of Juárez. This major north-south highway and railroad, between Ciudad Juárez and the city of Chihuahua crosses through this dune area, and low dunes are visible for many kilometers on each side of the highway.

The dramatic high dunes that exist close to the village of Samalayuca may be seen in the distance from Mexican Federal Highway 45. These dune fields are formed by the prevailing wind from the northwest dropping sand particles in the lee of the Sierra Samalayuca (Samalayuca Mountains).

Besides the high dunes appearing in the area of the village of Samalayuca, the dune fields lie in several other areas of the Samalayuca desert to the southwest and southeast of Ciudad Juárez. A lesser known part of the Salamayuca dune field extends to the west from Samalayuca into the area southwest from Ciudad Juárez. This area (lying west of Mexican Federal Highway 45) is larger than the more dramatic high dune area near Samalayuca and comprises the bulk of the Samalayuca desert area. These dune fields extend to the north where they lie across the (now abandoned) right-of-way of the defunct Mexico North Western Railway and extend into the municipality of Ascension. Smaller dune fields also extends to the east from the town of Salamayuca and into the municipality of Guadalupe.

== Chihuahua Trail ==
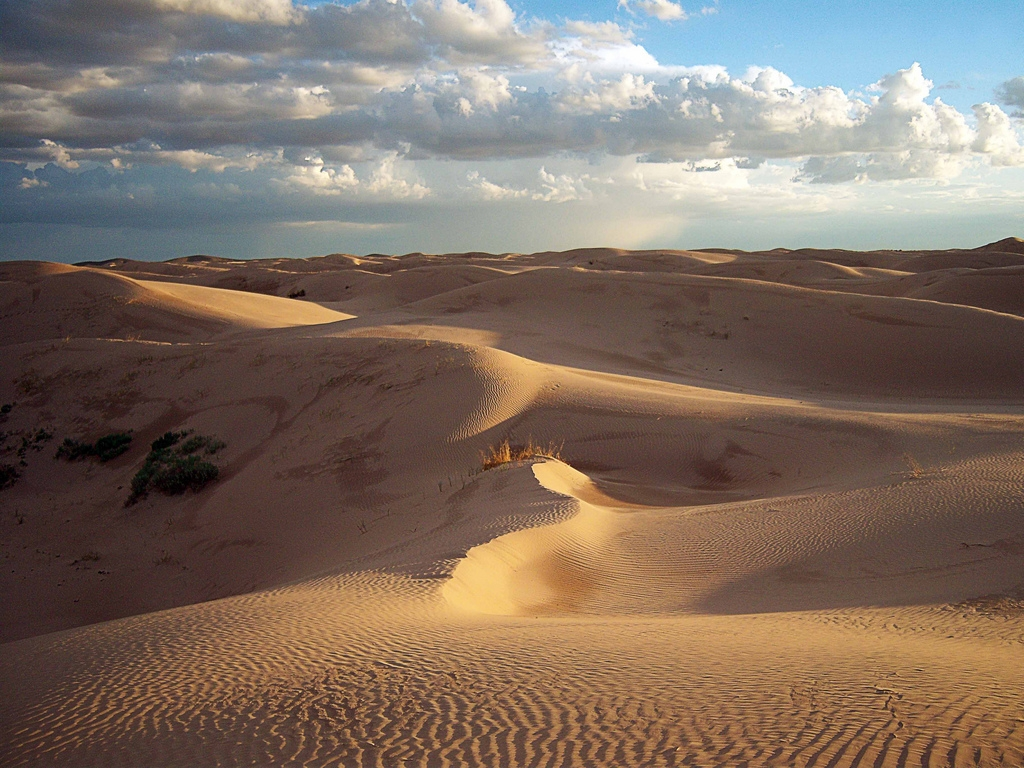
Samalayuca Sand Dunes

The Samalayuca Dune fields lie directly across the main route of the Chihuahua Trail, part of the longer route known as El Camino Real de Tierra Adentro, or the royal road of the interior. The portion of this route known as the Chihuahua Trail went north from Chihuahua City to Santa Fe, in New Mexico. From the time the Spanish colonial city of Santa Fe was founded in 1598 by the Spanish explorer Juan de Oñate there was steady and increasing freight and passenger traffic on this route.

The only major river on the trail was the Rio Grande. The trail crossed the river via a ford near a pass between the Juárez and Franklin mountain ranges. This ford and pass came to be known simply as "the Pass" (El Paso) or "The Pass of the North" (El Paso del Norte), and a town by the same name was first established south of the river, at the site of present-day Ciudad Juárez. A separate community also known as El Paso del Norte was later established on the north side of the river in 1849 after the Mexican-American War on United States Territory. The original Mexican community of El Paso del Norte south of the river changed its name to Ciudad Juárez in 1865.

However, in the segment of the Chihuahua trail from Chihuahua City and El Paso del Norte, where the trail reached a point some 45 miles south of the Pass of the North, the trail encountered a 15-mile stretch of the Samalayuca dune fields. The wind shifted and renewed the deep and finely gained deep sand beds in these dunes. The soft shifting sands made walking through the dune fields tiring and time-consuming for animals or people. Horses, oxen, mules and people could cross this sandy area only with great difficulty. The traditional two-wheeled carts (carreteras) could become bogged down in the sands.

=== Juan de Oñate and alternative routes ===
In 1598, Juan de Oñate, a wealthy Zacatecas nobleman, set out northward from the Valle de San Bartolomé, New Spain, to establish a new northern colony and is credited with pioneering the Chihuahua Trail route. When he reached Los Médanos, he attempted to cross but found the difficulty so great that he detoured to the east to go around the dunes. After detouring around the dunes, he traveled north again to the area where he founded San Juan, the first capital of New Mexico.

Oñate's detour set a precedent, and thereafter an alternative trail led around the sand dunes near Salamaluca. South of the dunes, the Chihuahua trail forked at Laguna de Patos. The detour branched off south of the dunes at Lagunas de Patos and veered northeast for roughly 60 miles, across the southeastern margin of the dune fields until it reached the south bank of the Rio Grande. This branch then turned and followed the Rio Grande's south bank upstream in a northwest direction about 60 miles to El Paso, where the two branches of the trail were again joined. After El Paso, the trail proceeded to Santa Fe.

At Laguna de Patos, the main branch of the Chihuahua Trail proceeded due north crossing the dune fields to reach El Paso in about 65 miles. In this distance the trail crossed the dunes for a distance of 12 to 15 miles, emerging from the sand to cross about 30 miles of desert brush lands before finally reaching El Paso.

The detour around the dune fields added some fifty or sixty miles to the direct route through the dune fields. To a horseman traveling at 20 miles a day, this could mean a delay of three days, while to a merchant caravan moving at twelve miles a day between Chihuahua and El Paso, this could mean a delay in transit of five or more days.

=== Scarcity of water ===
When traveling the route that led through the dunes, water was critical. The only reliable water sources lay miles to the north and south of the sand dunes near Samalayuca. Water supplies near the dunes were very scarce. Although several springs flowed near the present settlement of Samalayuca on the northern edge of this stretch of sand, these springs were not reliable sources of water for two reasons: salinity and ephemerality.

Recent surveys confirm that three springs exist in the area of Samalayuca, but the saline content renders two of them unfit for drinking. Water for those currently living in Samalayuca comes from hand dug shallow wells.

Travelers in the 1840s additionally reported that the Ojo de Samalayuca (Samalayuca Springs) were seasonal. In the dry season of a dry year, these springs would cease to flow, which would leave no water source on the trail between El Paso del Norte and the village of Carrizal in the south.

=== Experiences of travelers in the 1800s ===
In order to avoid the delay of traveling around the dune fields on the detour, many travelers on the trail between Chihuahua and El Paso del Norte elected to go directly across the dune fields.

From the 1600s though the 1800s merchants, explorers, soldiers and the random tourist traveling on the Chihuahua trail found passage through the Samalayuca dunes difficult and dangerous. Throughout this period of three centuries the Apache Indians conducted their off and on guerrilla war with the encroaching Spanish, operating out of the Sierra Madre mountains to the west. They sporadically attacked and sometimes laid waste to hacienda/ranches and small settlements in the area. As part of this conflict the Apaches kept watch over the trail across the dunes, as well as the water holes in and around the dunes fields, in order to rob and kill vulnerable groups of travelers.

Even as late as 1882 travelers were "warned to avoid this point [Los Médanos] of all others while traveling through Chihuahua", and to take the alternative route around the dunes area, though some 60 miles longer, because "This place is attended by great danger from the attacks of the Apaches, who well know the helpless condition of animals passing and take the opportunity to attack parties."

While animals and persons found footing and traction to be difficult in the loose sands of the dunes, what was most dreaded was the difficulty of hauling loaded wagons or carts through the sand. These vehicles could bog down to their hubs. Some merchants going south from El Paso started out with carts loaded with goods, but would hire a mule train to accompany them. On arrival at the dunes, the goods from the carts would be loaded on the mule train and the emptied carts would then be pulled over the dunes. On the south side of the dunes the carts would be reloaded and proceed.

In 1842 a George W. Kendall made a diary as he traveled through the dunes. He was one of a group of political prisoners, who were marched down the Chihuahua trail, guarded by units of the Mexican army. He observed high "mountains" of loose sand along the trail. He noted that horses would sink in sand to their fetlocks, and walking in the sand exhausted men and animals. The two-wheeled carreteras would bog down in the sand and to pull them through this area required doubling the teams. Kendall also noted a large stone, weighing some 200 pounds directly in the path through the dune fields. Over many years passing gangs of muleteers had superstitiously adopted the custom of lifting the stone and moving it farther along, each gang moving it a few feet at a time towards Mexico City. Their recurrent activity, continuing over many decades were reported to have moved the stone some 14 miles.

In 1846 an English soldier of fortune reported the track through the dunes littered with skeletons and dead bodies of oxen, mules and horses. He reported the sand to be knee deep, and constantly shifting. The dunes caused death to animals and humans. "On one ridge the upper half of a human skeleton protruded from the sand".

Traveling by night avoided the punishing desert heat during the summer months, and in 1846 a German scientist Friedrich Adolph Wislizenus described such a night passage through the dunes. Flashes of lightning illuminated ghostly images of slow moving wagons, riders on horseback wrapped in blankets, and travelers on foot walking or sleeping beside the track. Quiet prevailed except for the cries of muleteers and the thunder, The winding passage of the procession through the dunes was marked with multiple pinpoints of light from "cigarritos".

During the Mexican War, Colonel Alexander William Doniphan led a force of about 1000 American soldiers south from El Paso. They had engaged to guard a merchant caravan of about 315 heavy wagons going to Chihuahua City. They elected to go through the Salamayuca Sands, rather than take the detour. After entering the dune fields, the mules pulling the heavy wagon train sank to their knees in the sand, and the wheels of the wagons buried to the hubs. With the merchant's wagons bogged down, men and animals began to suffer serious debility from lack of water. The column had to abandon thousands of pounds of supplies in order to free the wagons from the sands, and men and animals had to join together to push and pull the wagons forward out of the dune area. Once past the dunes, Colonel Doniphan went on south, and still accompanied by the wagon train he defeated a Mexican force at the Battle of the Sacramento River, thereafter capturing Chihuahua City.

=== The Dunes today ===
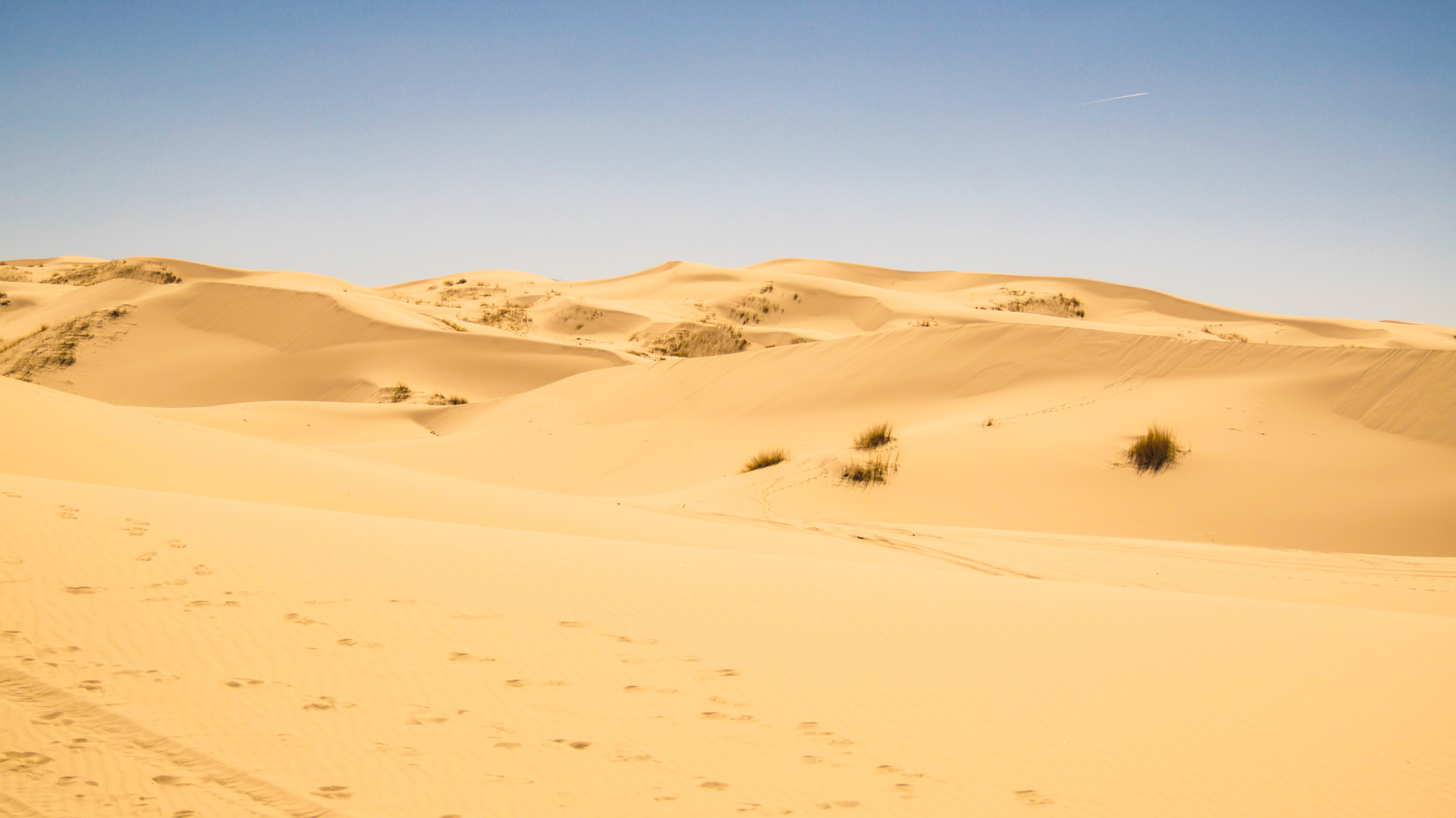
Samalayuca Dunes

Today, the original trail (except for the branch which skirted the Samalayuca sand dunes) from Chihuahua, Mexico to El Paso, Texas lies beneath or beside Mexico's Federal Highway 45. Paralleling the highway is a railroad, now used only to haul freight.

A traveler on Highway 45 passes over the sandy areas without difficulty.

== Composition and creation of the dune fields ==
The white to tan sands of the dune fields are almost pure silica. On average, the sand contains 90-95% quartz and 5-10% mixed rock grains.

The particle shapes are nodular and spheroid. they were formed by airflow erosion of rocks that created small fragments that were then carried away by the wind, to be deposited in natural land depressions. Another factor assisting in the formation of the dunes is the abrupt changes of temperature that exist in the desert, which assisted in the breaking up of surface rock into sand grains.

== Endemic species ==
In large dune systems, many species of plants and animals evolve and adapt to the harsh environment, and thus become unique and endemic. The Samalayuca dunes are no exception. They provide the habitat for 248 plant and 154 animal species, most of them endemic. The area is therefore biologically unique on a global scale, and is receiving greater attention as a biosphere. Most of the known endemic species in the Samalayuca Dunes are plants and various native bee species.

== Industrial interest in the dune fields ==
The several million tons of sand in the Salamayuca dunes can be considered as an enormous potential of silica sand since they are 90 to 95 pure silica (SiO_{2}). Silica sand is widely used in what is called "the transforamation industry", for the making of glass, silicates, paints, glass-ceramics and ceramics. The sand of the Salamayuca dunes has attracted attention from the ceramic/glass industry but the desert sand contains sufficient impurities to pose problems with its use in industry, and a process to increase uniform purity to 97.5% SiO_{2} would have to be developed. Because the sands start with such a high percentage of silica, such a process is deemed feasible.

== Tourism interest in the dune fields near Samalayuca ==
The dramatic appearance of the dunes near Samalayuca, visible from Highway 45, has generated tourism interest in the dunes. This includes adventure tourism. Tourists hike in the dunes, ride over them in various vehicles, and slide down the dunes on sand boards.

== Government protection ==
On June 5 of 2009, the Mexican federal government created a protected area of 63,182 hectares (631.82 km^{2}, or 156,126.12 acres) in Samalayuca dune fields.

== Movie setting ==
The Samalayuca Dunes were used to film many of the exterior shots in the 1984 movie Dune. The dunes were also used as a location for another 1984 film, Conan The Destroyer.

== See also ==
- Juárez Municipality, Chihuahua
- Chihuahua (state)
- Chihuahuan Desert
- Médanos (geology)
- Trans-Pecos
- Dune (1984 film)
