= Glacial Lake Iroquois =

Prehistoric lake that became Lake Ontario

Lake Iroquois
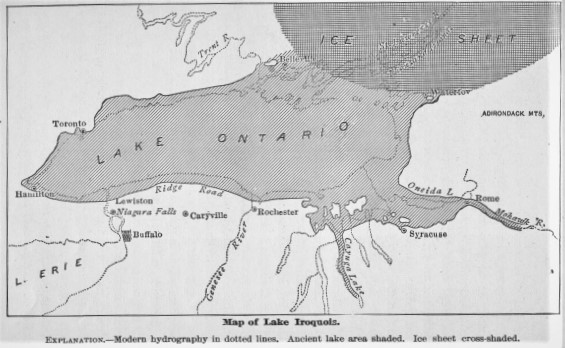
- This map shows the valley of the Mohawk River, through which Glacial Lake Iroquois crossed the mountains to the Hudson River Valley.

- Location within North America
- Location: North America
- Group: Great Lakes
- Coordinates: 43.7°N 77.9°W
- Lake type: former lake
- Etymology: Iroquois or Haudenosaunee (/ˈhoʊdənoʊˈʃoʊni/; "People of the Longhouse")
- Primary inflows: Niagara River
- Primary outflows: Mohawk River to the Hudson River
- Basin countries: Canada; United States
- Max. length: 196 mi (315 km)
- Max. width: 57 mi (92 km)
- Surface elevation: 345 ft (105 m)
- References: United States Geological Survey, George Otis Smith, Director; The Pleistocene of Indiana and Michigan and the History of the Great Lakes; Frank Leverett and Frank B. Taylor; Department of the Interior, Monographs of the United States Geological Survey; Volume LIII; Washington; Government Printing Office; 1915

Glacial Lake Iroquois was a prehistoric proglacial lake that existed at the end of the last ice age approximately 13,000 years ago.

== Description ==
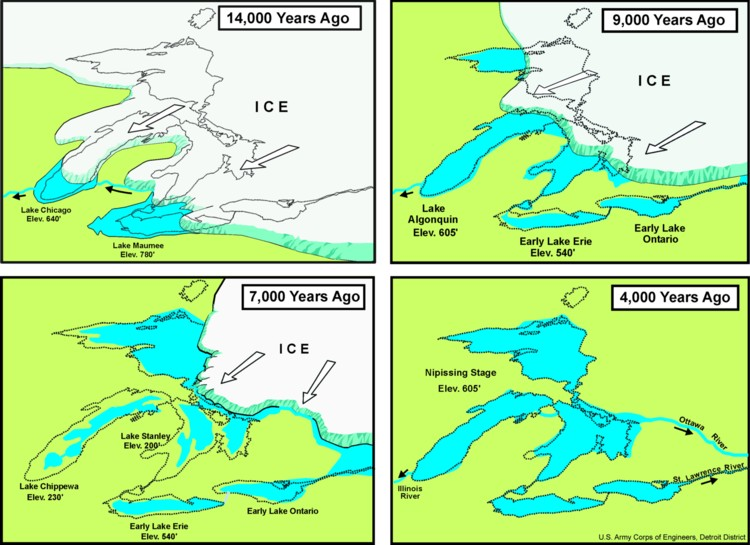
Stages of great lake development.

The lake was essentially an enlargement of the present Lake Ontario that formed because the St. Lawrence River downstream from the lake was blocked by the ice sheet near the present Thousand Islands. The level of the lake was approximately 30 m (~100 ft) above the present level of Lake Ontario.

The lake drained to the southeast, through a channel passing near present day Rome, New York. The Rome Sand Plains has several sand ridges that geologists think were formed at this time. The channel then followed the valley of the Mohawk River to the Hudson River.

The lake was fed by Early Lake Erie, as well as Glacial Lake Algonquin, an early partial manifestation of Lake Huron, that drained directly to Lake Iroquois across southern Ontario, along the southern edge of the ice sheet, bypassing Early Lake Erie.

The subsequent melting of the ice dam produced a sudden lowering of the lake to its present level, a potential trigger for the Younger Dryas episode. The resulting flood also created the Narrows in New York City, destroying the part of the moraine then uniting Staten Island and Brooklyn.

== Remnant shorelines ==
Two ancient shorelines in the Toronto area mark the existence of former glacial lakes. About 2 km inland from the shore, a ridge known as the Iroquois Shoreline can be discerned. The old shoreline runs west-east, running roughly parallel to Davenport Road just south of St. Clair Avenue West. Further east, the Scarborough Bluffs also formed part of the shoreline of the ancient lake. In Mississauga, the shoreline is found south of Dundas Street and most visible with hills found east and west of Mavis Road.

Another ancient shoreline exists between 2–4 km offshore of Toronto. It is known as the Toronto Scarp and formed the shore of Glacial Lake Warren or Admiralty Lake. From Bluffer's Park in Scarborough to just west of Hanlan's Point is an underwater bluff.

In Hamilton, Ontario the Burlington Heights represents a sand and gravel bar formed across the mouth of Cootes Paradise, at the western end of Glacial Lake Iroquois.

In New York, Ridge Road and New York State Route 104 run from west to east along a ridge of the old shoreline of Lake Iroquois.

== See also ==
- Lake Agassiz
- List of prehistoric lakes
- Lake Coleman
