= List of glacial moraines =

This a partial list of glacial moraines. They are arranged by continents and divided by related hydrologic basins. This list is incomplete. Please improve the listing.

== North America ==
=== Moraines of the Great Lakes Region ===
==== Lake Ontario Basin ====
- Oak Ridge
- Alden
- Buffalo
- Niagara Falls
- Forest
- Gowanda
- Hamburg
- Marilla
- Alden
- Pembroke
- Batavia
- Barre
- Alboin

==== Lake Erie Basin ====
- Waterloo
- Salamonie
- Trafalgar
- Defiance
- Fort Wayne
- Wabash
- Mississinewa
- Packerton
- Union City
- Shelbyville
- Illinoian

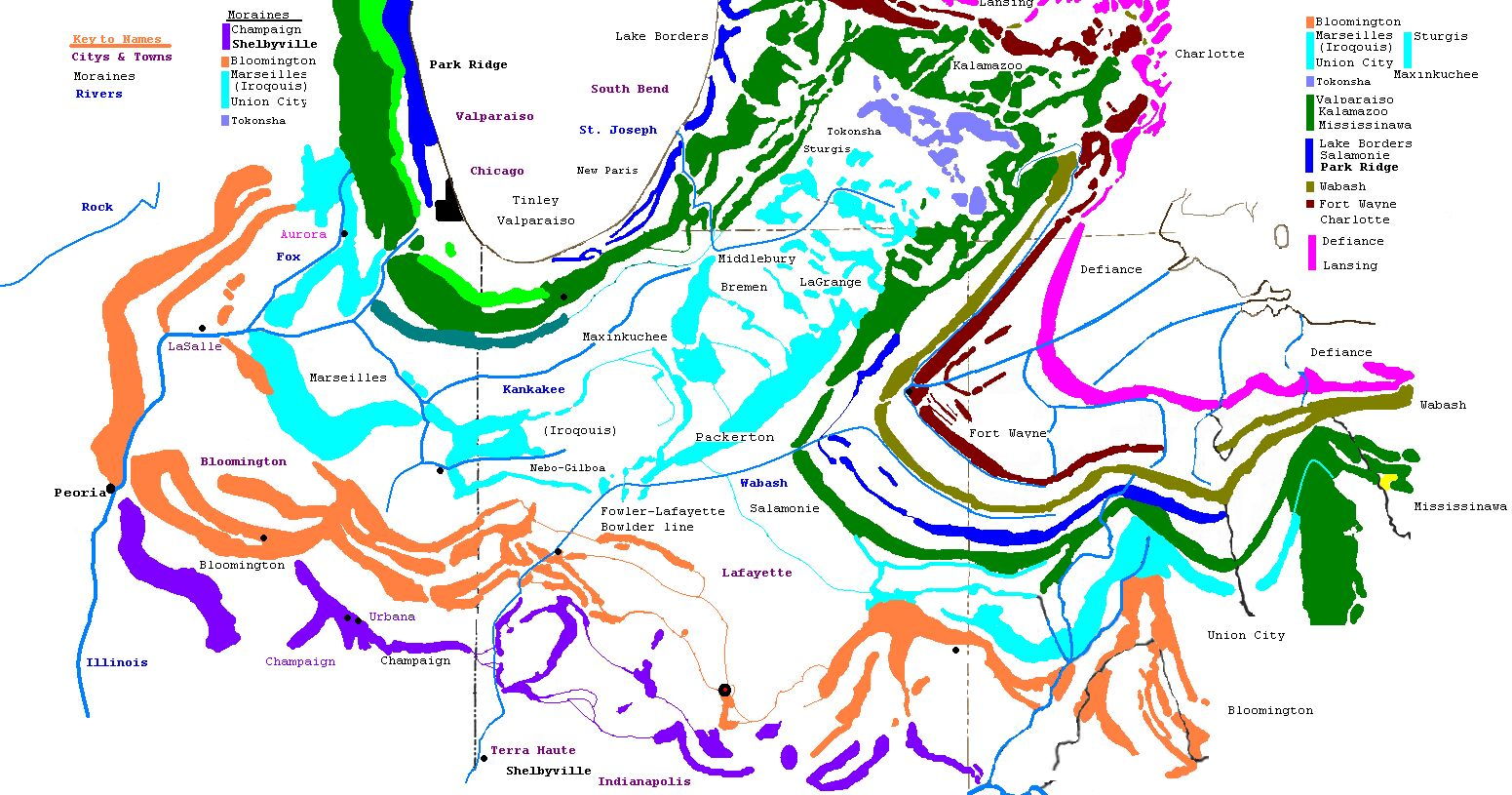
Moraines south of the Great Lakes

==== Lake Huron Basin ====
- Port Huron
- Chesanings
- West Haven
- Henderson
- Owosso
- Flint
- Otisville
- St. Johns
- Fowler
- Lyons
- Tawas
- Alden

===== Saginaw lobe =====
- Charlotte
- Tekonsha
- Kalamazoo
- Sturgis
- Lagrange
- Middlebury
- New Paris
- Bremen
- Maxinkuckee

===== Interlobate ‘thumb’ of Michigan =====
- Port Huron
- Portland
- Lyons
- Fowler
- Imlay and Goodland
- Otter Lake (St. Johns)
- Otisville
- Deanville
- Mayville
- Owosso
- Yale
- St. Juniata

==== Lake Michigan Basin ====
- Manistee
- Port Huron
- Lake Border
- Valparaiso
  - Tinley
  - Park Ridge
- Kalamazoo
- Marseilles
- Bloomington
- Champaign
  - Cerro Gordo
- Shelbyville
- Illinoian

==== Lake Superior Basin ====
- Beroun
- Mille Lacs
- Wright
- Cromwell
- Draco
- Cloquet
- Thompson
- Kerrick
- Nickerson
- Fond du Lac
- Highland
- Grand Marais
- Marenisco

=== Moraines of the Quebec and Ontario, Canada ===
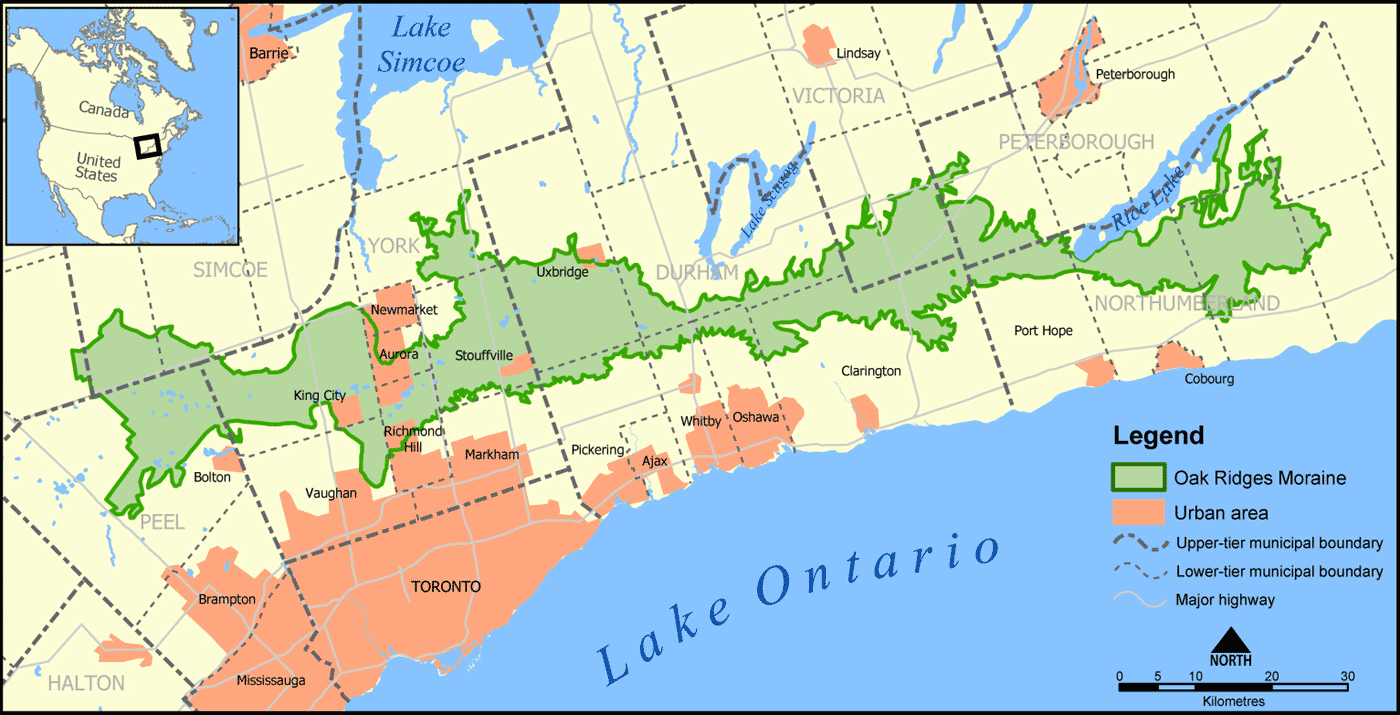
Oak Ridge Moraine

- Oak Ridges – Ontario
- Trafalgar – Ontario
- Waterloo – Ontario
- Dixville – Quebec
- Cherry River–East-Angus – Quebec
- Ulverton-Tingwick – Quebec

=== Moraines of the Maritimes of Canada and NE United States ===
- Cape Cod - Massachusetts
- North Shore (Long Island)
- Harbor Hill moraine - Long Island, New York
- Hammonasset Beach State Park

=== Moraines of Western Canada ===
- Beaver Hills - Alberta

=== Moraines of the Great Plains of the United States ===
- Leaf Hills, Minnesota

=== Moraines of the U.S. and Canadian Rocky Mountains ===
- Withrow Moraine and Jameson Lake Drumlin Field – Washington

== Europe ==
- Lüneburg Heath – Germany
- Rogen moraine – Sweden, Norway

- Lake Rogen – Sweden

- Pulju moraine – Finland
- Salpausselkä – Finland
- Sevetti moraine – Finland
- Trollgarden – Norway
- Veiki moraine – Sweden, Norway
- Raet - Norway, Sweden, Finland
- La Serra morainic amphitheater of Ivrea - Piedmont, Italy

== Antarctica ==
- Dart
- Dovers
- Elephant
- Løken
- Moraine Fjord - South Georgia
- Pinafore
- Reckling
- Two Step

=== Queen Maud Land ===
- Austbanen
- Bremotet
- Furdesanden
- Henry
- Mel
- Sanbakken
- Sandeidet
- Schussel
- Tvireta
- Vestbanen

=== Ross Dependency ===
- Bowsprit
- Chain
- Flotsam
- Hells Gate
- Jetsam
- Knobhead
- Shipwreck
- The Strand
- Swithinbank

== South America ==
- Rio Blanco - Argentina
- Hatcher - Argentina
- Caracoles - Argentina
- Gorra de Poivre - Argentina
- Horcones – Argentina
- Penitentes
- Punt de Vacas
- Lago Sarmiento I – South Patagonian Icefield - Argentina
- Lago Sarmiento II – South Patagonian Icefield - Argentina
- Lago Sarmiento III – South Patagonian Icefield - Argentina
- Cordillera Paine IV – South Patagonian Icefield - Argentina
- Cordillera Paine V – South Patagonian Icefield - Argentina
- Cordillera Paine VI – South Patagonian Icefield - Argentina
- Rio Laguna – Chile
- Rio Seco at Rio Laguna - Chile
- Ojos de Agua - Chile
- Portillo - Chile
- Guardia Vieja - Chile
- Salto del Soldado - Chile
