= Lake Kankakee =

Lake in the United States

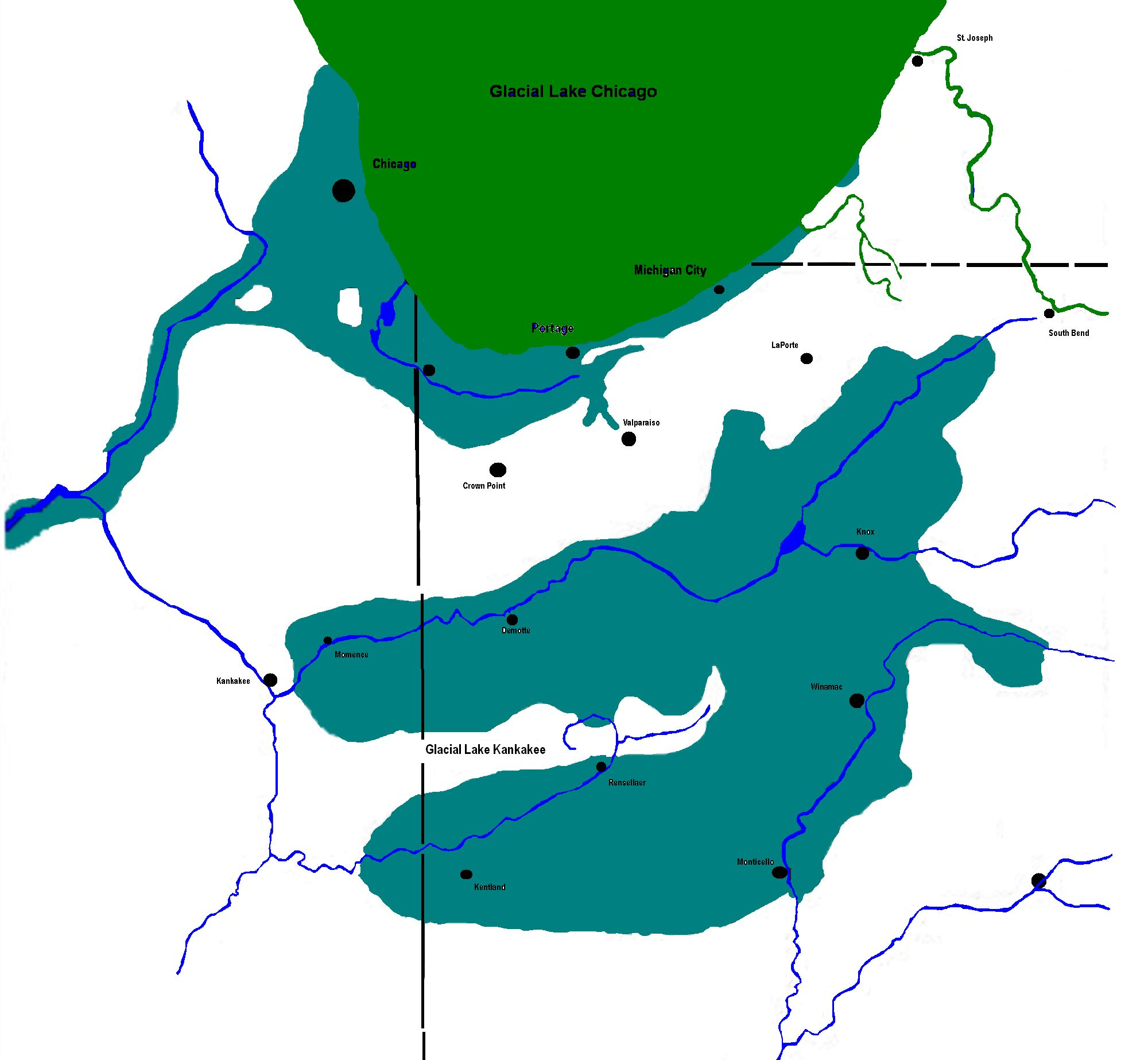
- Lake Kankakee based on Barrett, Edward, 1916

- Location within the United States
- Location: North America
- Group: Great Lakes
- Coordinates: 41.22°N 86.96°W
- Primary inflows: Wisconsin Glacier
- Primary outflows: Kankakee River
- Catchment area: l
- Basin countries: Canada; United States
- Max. length: 50 mi (80 km)
- Max. width: 50 mi (80 km)
- Average depth: 40 ft (12 m)
- Max. depth: 45 ft (14 m)
- Surface elevation: 560 ft (171 m)

Lake Kankakee formed 14,000 years before present (YBP) in the valley of the Kankakee River. It developed from the outwash of the Michigan Lobe, Saginaw Lobe, and the Huron-Erie Lobe of the Wisconsin glaciation. These three ice sheets formed a basin across Northwestern Indiana. It was a time when the glaciers were receding, but had stopped for a thousand years in these locations. The lake drained about 13,000 YBP, until reaching the level of the Momence Ledge. The outcropping of limestone created an artificial base level, holding water throughout the upper basin, creating the Grand Kankakee Marsh.

Lake Kankakee was a prehistoric lake during the Wisconsin glacial epoch of the Pleistocene Era. The lake formed during the period, when the Michigan and Saginaw lobes of the Laurentian glacier had receded back to the Valparaiso and Kalamazoo moraines. While the glacial advance became stagnant, the summer runoff formed a large lake covered parts of 13 counties in two states.

Around 1840, Mr. F. H. Bradley applied the name Lake Kankakee to the lake which he thought formerly occupied the Kankakee basin. The sand deposits outside the marsh were the first clue that the lake existed. These sands were the result of Aeolian or wind processes, not lacustrine, or fluvial processes. He predicted that the lake would have been at an elevation of 685 feet (209 m) above sea level.

== Origin ==
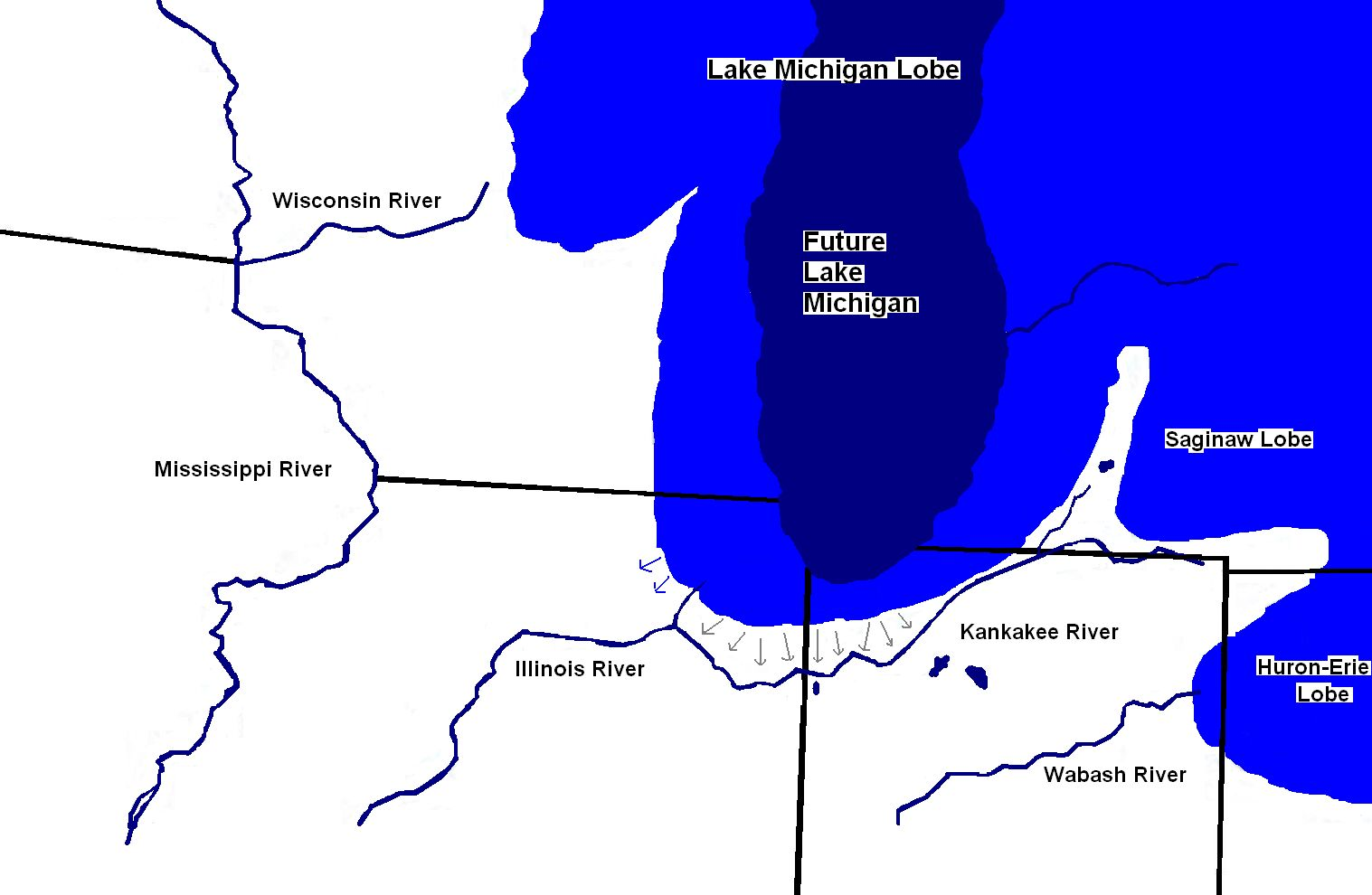
Formation of the Valparaiso Moraine and the Kankakee Valley.

The glaciers were static, only in that the glacial fronts melted at a rate matching the southward push of the ice mass. The meltwaters from the eastern edge of the Michigan Lobe and the western edge of the Saginaw Lobe ran through the Dowagiac River valley of western Michigan. Joining the ancestral St. Joseph River, reversing the flow southward towards the flat plain till plain, where South Bend, Indiana now stands. From the east, the St. Joseph River valley drained the meltwaters from the southern edge of the Saginaw Lobe and the northwestern shoulder of the Huron-Erie Lobe.

The Valparaiso Moraine formed the southern flank of the Michigan Lobe as well as the northern ridge of the Kankakee Valley. At the northern end of the valley, the Dowagiac River valley extended northward between the Valparaiso Moraine on the west and the Kalamazoo Moraine on the east. The Kalamazoo Moraine formed one side of the melting Saginaw Lobe, with the southern flank sitting on the Sturgis Moraine. South of the Sturgis Moraine, the future St. Joseph River was a marshy plain, extending southeastward towards the toe of the Huron-Erie Lobe. First the Union City Moraine formed, then as the ice receded and again stabilized the Mississinawa Moraine formed along the front of this ice The Saginaw Lobe's meltwater flowed across the St. Joseph valley, while the Huron-Erie Lobe's meltwater and sediments first flowed into the upper Tippecanoe River. When the glacier moved back to the Mississinawa Moraine, the off flowing water created the Eel River valley.

The waters coming down the St. Joseph valley crossed the till plain south and east of the future South Bend entering the valley of the Kankakee River. Water from the Huron-Erie Lobe came through the upper Tippecanoe valley, spreading across the till plain, in Starke, Pulaski, Jasper, and Newton counties, merging with the shallow waters in the Kankakee basin of St. Joseph, LaPorte, Porter and Lake counties. The meltwaters were trapped between the ice masses to the north and east and the Nebo-Gilboa Ridge, an offshoot of the Bloomington Moraine to the south and the Marseilles moraine. On the west, the Marseilles moraine formed the final and lowest barrier. In the vicinity of Marseilles, Illinois the waters crested the divide and created an outlet into the pre-glacial Mississippi River, creating the modern Illinois River. This event is known as the Kankakee Torrent.

== Description ==
Lake Kankakee covered over 3,000 square miles (7,800 km^{2}) of northern Indiana and the border of Illinois. The lake had two open bodies of water, split by the Iroquois Moraine, which formed a peninsula from the west. The northern waters stretched from just west of Momence, Illinois, along the main stem of the Kankakee River to the marshes southwest of South Bend, Indiana. The southern waters stretched from near Watseka, Illinois eastward to the Tippecanoe River. These two basins were linked across 35 miles (56 km) of the nearly level Tipton Till Plain, west of the Tippecanoe River. The valley of the Tippecanoe from Monticello, north pass Winimac and reaching to Rochester was a part of this lake.

== Development ==
Beginning around 15,000 years ago, the Michigan lobe of the Laurentian glacier had retreated back to a line along the Valparaiso Moraine, from Wisconsin along a line, 30 miles (48 km) inland of Lake Michigan, southward, around the City of Chicago, and the southern tip of Lake Michigan, through Indiana, curving northward into the State of Michigan, only 15 miles (24 km) inland from the shoreline. Meanwhile, the Huron-Saginaw lobe had melted back to the north and east along a line in Michigan extending from Holland eastward through Kalamazoo to Jackson. Beginning 14,000 years ago, the glacial lobes had cleared the valley of the Kankakee River of ice. At this point, the forward movement of ice coming from the north equaled the rate of melting over the summer season. Now stagnant, glacier provided a continuing source of ground rock and soil to the southern edge of the glacier, creating the Valaparaiso Moraine and releasing vast quantities of water, sand and silt into the valley beyond. The water created Lake Kankakee, flooding are area from Momence, Illinois upstream to the east to South Bend, Indiana with a southern pool reaching from Watseka, Illinois east to Monticello and Winamac, Indiana.

Lacustrine deposits are those deposited in lake water and only when the lake drains or the land rises, does it become dry land. Most of the soils throughout the counties surrounding the Kankakee are loamy (up to a quarter clay, quarter to half silt with less than half being sand.)[3] The outwash plain is underlain by sand with gravel inter-bedded throughout. The prevailing westerly winds began to treat the 'Lake Kankakee' like the shores of Lake Michigan. Dunes began to form along the south and eastern shoreline. Where ice blocks had been left behind, sand filled the depressions. Runoff from the Valparaiso Moraine built [2] outwash ridges of sand leading into the lake. On the south, the winds built dunes. As the volume of water decreased from the glacier melting northward, the lake slowly drained and filled. Not being able to cut a channel through the limestone ridge in Momence, the Kankakee Lake became 500,000 acres (202,346 ha) of marshland.

== Aeolian sand ==
The Aeolian sands form the southern boundary of Lake Kankakee as they result from the wind moving sand from the shoreline inland. This feature begins in the northeast along the Maxinkuckee moraine of the Saginaw ice lobe in Marshall County, Indiana near Lake Maxinkuckee and Culver, Indiana. While a few dunes are found on the moraine, the sand beds are along the western edge. The Maxinkuckee moraine follows the north side of Tippecanoe River into Fulton County eastward towards Rochester. The southeastern edge of the sands, swings south and west through Cass County, to west of Logansport, turning west and passing 9 miles (14 km) north of Lake Cicott. Here a sand ridge forms the east border of the till plain sloping westward to the Tippecanoe River. This ridge runs westward in continuous line to the Tippecanoe Valley at Monticello. This is a lateral moraine between the Saginaw lobe on the north and the Erie lobe on the south. The ridge continue westward and becomes hard to distinguish as it passes west of Kentland, Indiana.

== Outlet ==
Lake Kankakee was over 40 feet (12 m) higher than the current river. It topped the western divide near Morris, Illinois, where a lake had formed as the glacier retreated from the Marseilles moraine. Initially, this water body, drained through numerous gaps in the moraine at the 640 feet (200 m) to 650 feet (200 m) above sea level, until the gap on the present Illinois River dropped lower than the rest, becoming the outlet for this lake. This outlet crosses exposed bedrock implying that it was a long slow process. Thus, this lake and Lake Kankakee were held in check. The terraces and beaches in the Morris Basin are 560 feet (170 m) above sea level or 60 feet (18 m) above the present head of the Illinois River. This shows that this lake existed during the Valparaiso Moraine stage. The lakes level extended up the Kankakee River Valley about as far as Braidwood, where the sand dunes set in. Once this breach in the Marseilles moraine was created, it became the discharged for Lake Chicago . Combined with Lake Wauponsee's waters, the outlet deepened. Lake Kankakee at this time was draining much of the St. Joseph Rivers watershed, which was fed by the Saginaw lobe. The erosion by this quantity of water created many of the features along the Illinois River and the lower Kankakee River. The rock barrier at Momence halted erosion further upriver. The various lakes formed by the glacial retreats and its moraines were at their maximum levels at this time. The outlet was at or above 650 feet (200 m) above sea level.

== See also ==
- Kankakee River
- Kankakee Outwash Plain
- Kankakee Torrent
- Grand Kankakee Marsh
- Kankakee, Illinois
- Proglacial lake
- Great Lakes
- List of prehistoric lakes

== Sources ==
- Dunes of Northwestern Indiana; Edward Barrett; Forty First Annual Report of Department of Geology and Natural Resources, Indiana; pg 11-22; Fort Wayne Printing Company; 1916
- The Glacial Lakes Around Michigan; William R. Farrand, Bulletin 4, Michigan Department of Environmental Quality, Geological Survey Division; Lansing, Michigan; revised 1988
- Chapter VI. The Saginaw Lobe; Frank Leverett; Monographs of the United States Geological Survey, Volume LIII, Government Printing Office, Washington; 1915
- The Illinois Glacial Lobe; Frank Leverett; Monographs of the United States Geological Survey, Volume XXXVIII, Government Printing Office, Washington; 1899
