= Fort Wayne Moraine =

Coordinates: 41°N 85°W

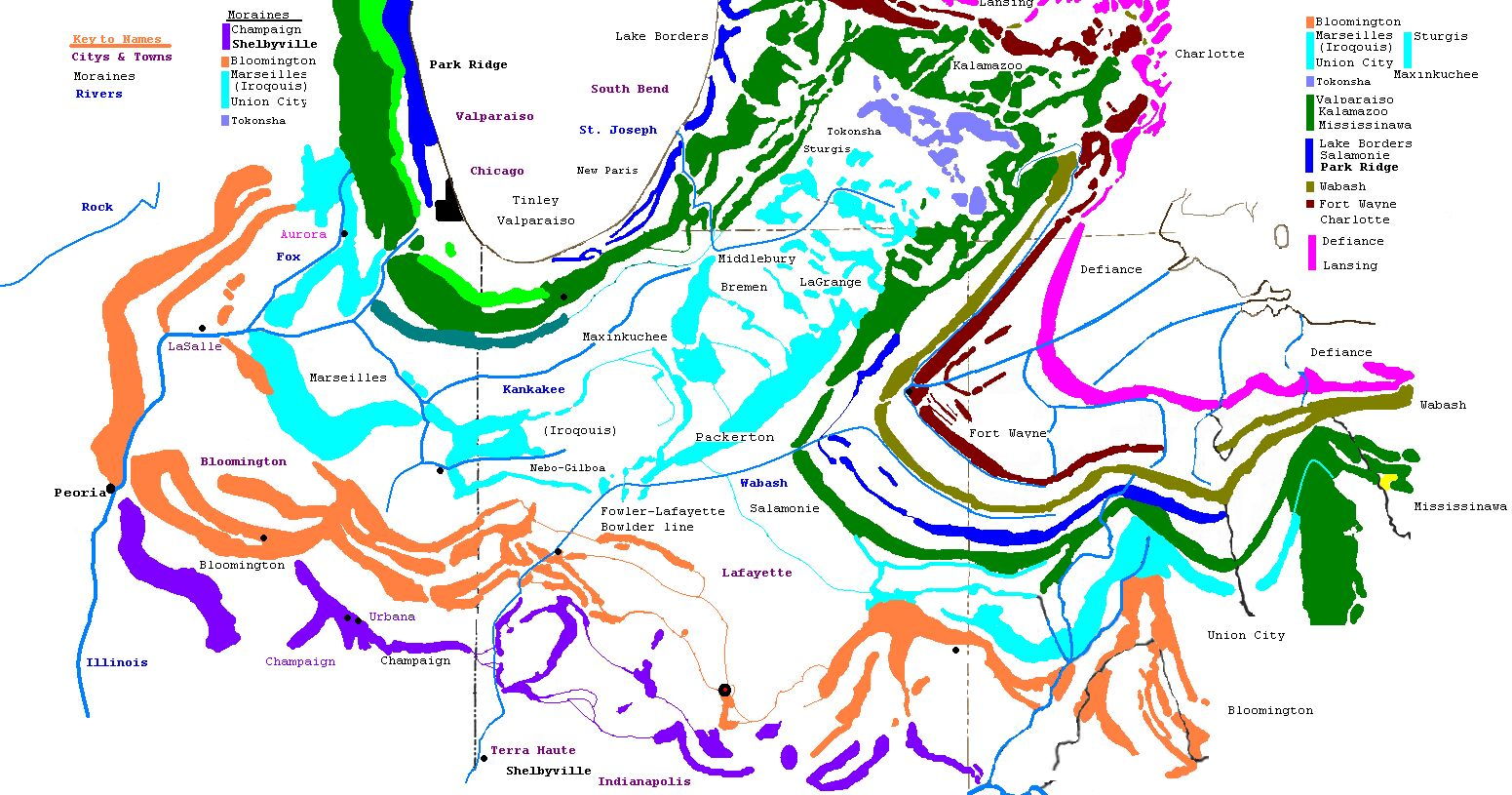
Moraines south of Lake Michigan and southwest of Lake Erie. A composite of three maps (Leverett 1915) (Leverett 1902) (Larsen 1986) and other sources. Colors represent moraines from the same time period of the Wisconsin Glacial epoch

The Fort Wayne Moraine is considered contemporary to the last stages of the Valparaiso Moraine. Centered on Fort Wayne, Indiana, the northern leg of the moraine is mostly overlaid by the younger Wabash Moraine angling northeastward through Williams County, Ohio. It only becomes identifiable in Lenawee County, Michigan south and northeast of Adrian before ending in the intermingling of moraines around Ann Arbor. The south and eastern leg of the moraine follows the northern bank of the St. Marys River into the State of Ohio. At the north bend of the St. Marys River, the moraine arcs northeastward through Lima, continuing in a northward arc to reach north of U.S. 30 in Hancock County to pass through Upper Sandusky, again bending to the north to end 15 miles (24 km) to 20 miles (32 km) to the northeast.

== Description ==
Beginning northeast of Upper Sandusky in Wyandot, looping along the southern county boundary, entering Hardin County along its northern border with Hancock County. The moraine then runs, west of southwest to the moraine runs, southwest to Lima. From Lima it runs west and northwest along the right bank of the St. Mary's River to Ft. Wayne. Continuing northeast on the left bank of the St. Joseph River to Hudson, Michigan in Lenawee County. The moraine is 3 miles (4.8 km) or 4 miles (6.4 km) wide and has an undulating surface. Its main crest is 50 feet (15 m) to 75 feet (23 m) above the beds of the rivers that follow the outer border. The rivers are in trenches 20 feet (6.1 m) to 30 feet (9.1 m) deep. The moraine is 30 feet (9.1 m) to 50 feet (15 m) above the bluff or plain. The wide outer slope of a mile (1.6 km) or more provides any local relief. The drift is a clay till and has boulders.

Fort Wayne Moraine
City	County, State	Elevation above sea level
Hudson	Lenawee County, Michigan	927 feet (283 m)
Summit west of Bryan	Williams County, Ohio	873 feet (266 m)
Summit west of Hicksville	Defiance, Ohio	849 feet (259 m)
Wabash-Erie channel. head of Maumee River	Allen County, Indiana	737 feet (225 m)
Summit east of Ft. Wayne	Allen County, Indiana	813 feet (248 m)
Summit, section 112, Madison	Allen County, Indiana	846 feet (258 m)
Two miles south of Spencerville	Allen County, Ohio	872 feet (266 m)
Two miles south of Lima	Allen County, Ohio	895 feet (273 m)
One mile north of Hog Creek Marsh	Hardin County, Ohio	914 feet (279 m)

== St. Mary's (south) Unit ==
The presence of the moraine is evident in the course of St. Mary's River. Its headwaters in Auglaize and Mercer counties, flow north toward the Maumee until it comes to the moraine ridge. Here it turns to the west. The ridge forms the watershed between the St. Mary's and the Auglaize River. It is about 4 miles (6.4 km) from the St. Mary's and 30 miles (48 km) the Auglaize. In Allen County, Indiana the Wayne trace, or old Piqua road follows the crest. The inner slope is gentle, while the outer slope is steep. On the west side of Six Mile Creek gap the moraine is a bold bluff 40 feet (12 m) to 50 feet (15 m) high to the point where the Wabash and Erie Canal once crossed the St. Mary's. The summit is 76 feet (23 m) above the mouth of the St. Mary's. The ridge is composed chiefly of boulder clay with a border of sand and gravel around its northern end.

== St. Joseph (north) Unit ==
North of Fort Wayne the moraine is simple in structure. It extends from Ft. Wayne along the left bank of the St. Joseph River into Michigan. Through Indiana it is four miles (6.4 km) wide and gets broader through Ohio and Michigan. It rises from 50 feet (15 m) to 70 feet (21 m) above the Maumee Lake bed.

== Outliers ==
The plains to the east between the Fort Wayne and Defiance is 45 miles (72 km) wide and is occupied by faint terminal moraines. These are closely related to the Fort Wayne moraine. Two moraines run parallel with the main crest of the Fort Wayne moraine in the vicinity of Lima, Ohio. The Bluffton moraine is west of Mount Cory to Bluffton and then turns southwest to within a mile (1.6 km) of Cairo and Elida. The Rawson moraine runs west from Rawson and curves to the southwest roughly parallel with the Bluffton moraine some 2 or 3 miles (3.2 or 4.8 km) north. A third significant ridge runs across Allen, Van Wert and into Adams and Allen counties. East of Landeck, 3 miles (4.8 km) southwest of Delphos, the ridge is indistinct through Venedocia, to the Auglaize River, 1 mile (1.6 km) northeast of Southworth. West, the ridge is distinct Monroeville, Indiana. Through Indiana the ridge is a double crest. North of Glenmore the moraine turns northwest. This ridge is later than the Bluffton moraine, and may be a westward continuation of the Rawson moraine.

== See also ==
- Mississinawa Moraine
- Union City Moraine
- Salamonie Moraine
- Wabash Moraine
- Defiance Moraine
- Maumee Torrent
- List of glacial moraines
