= Packerton =

Packerton may refer to:

- Packerton, Indiana, an unincorporated community in Kosciusko County
- Packerton, Pennsylvania, a village in Carbon County
