= Kankakee Torrent =

Prehistoric glacial lake outburst flood

Coordinates: 41°25′12″N 88°12′39″W

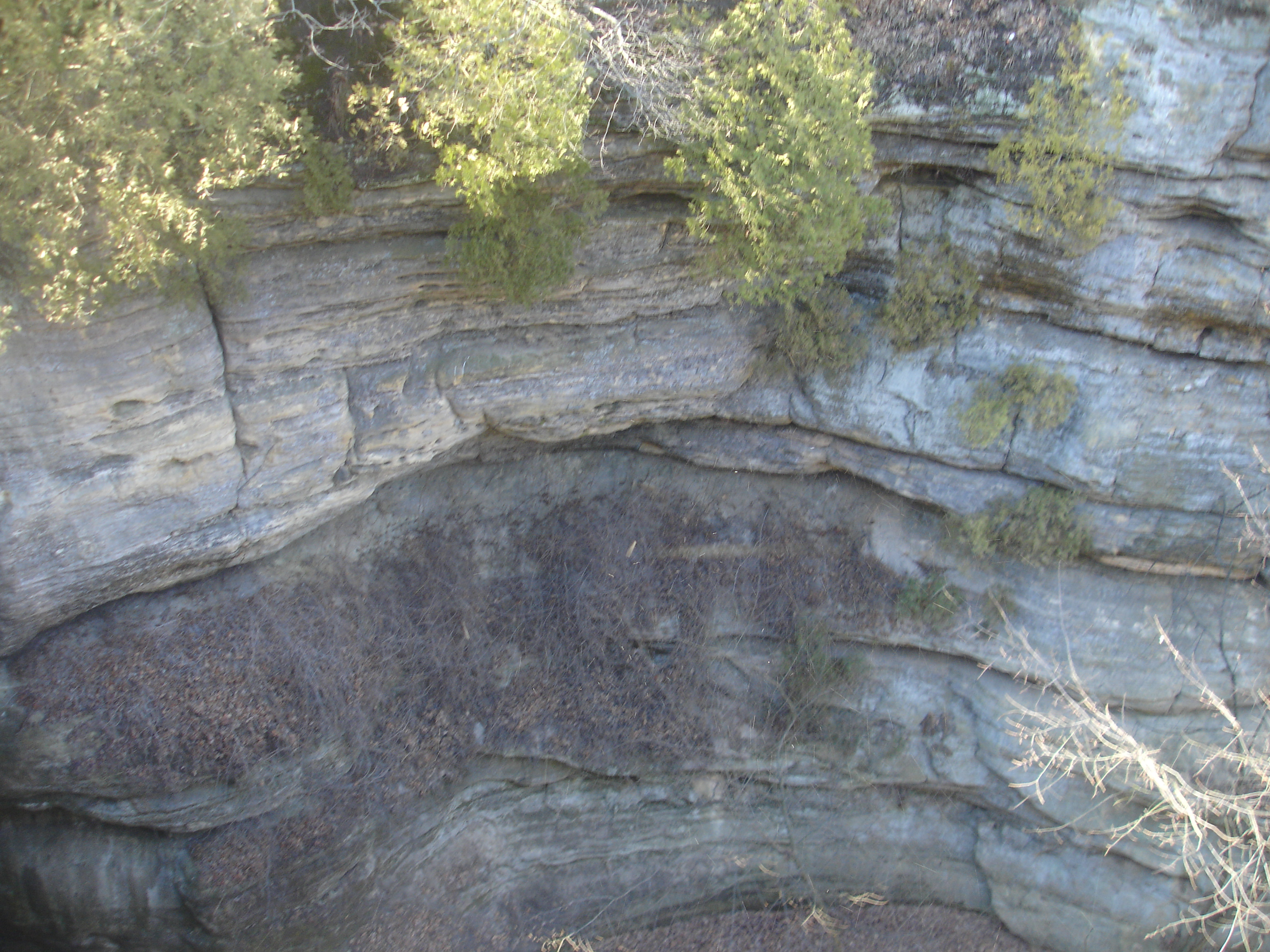
Sandstone cliff at Starved Rock State Park, carved by the force of the Kankakee Torrent some 19,000 years ago

The Kankakee Torrent was a catastrophic series of floods that occurred about 19,000 calibrated years ago in the Midwestern United States. It resulted from a breach of moraines forming a large glacial lake fed by the melting of the Late Wisconsin Laurentide Ice Sheet. The point of origin of the flood was Lake Chicago. The landscape south of Chicago still shows the effects of the torrent, particularly at Kankakee River State Park and on the Illinois River at Starved Rock State Park.

== Geomorphology features ==
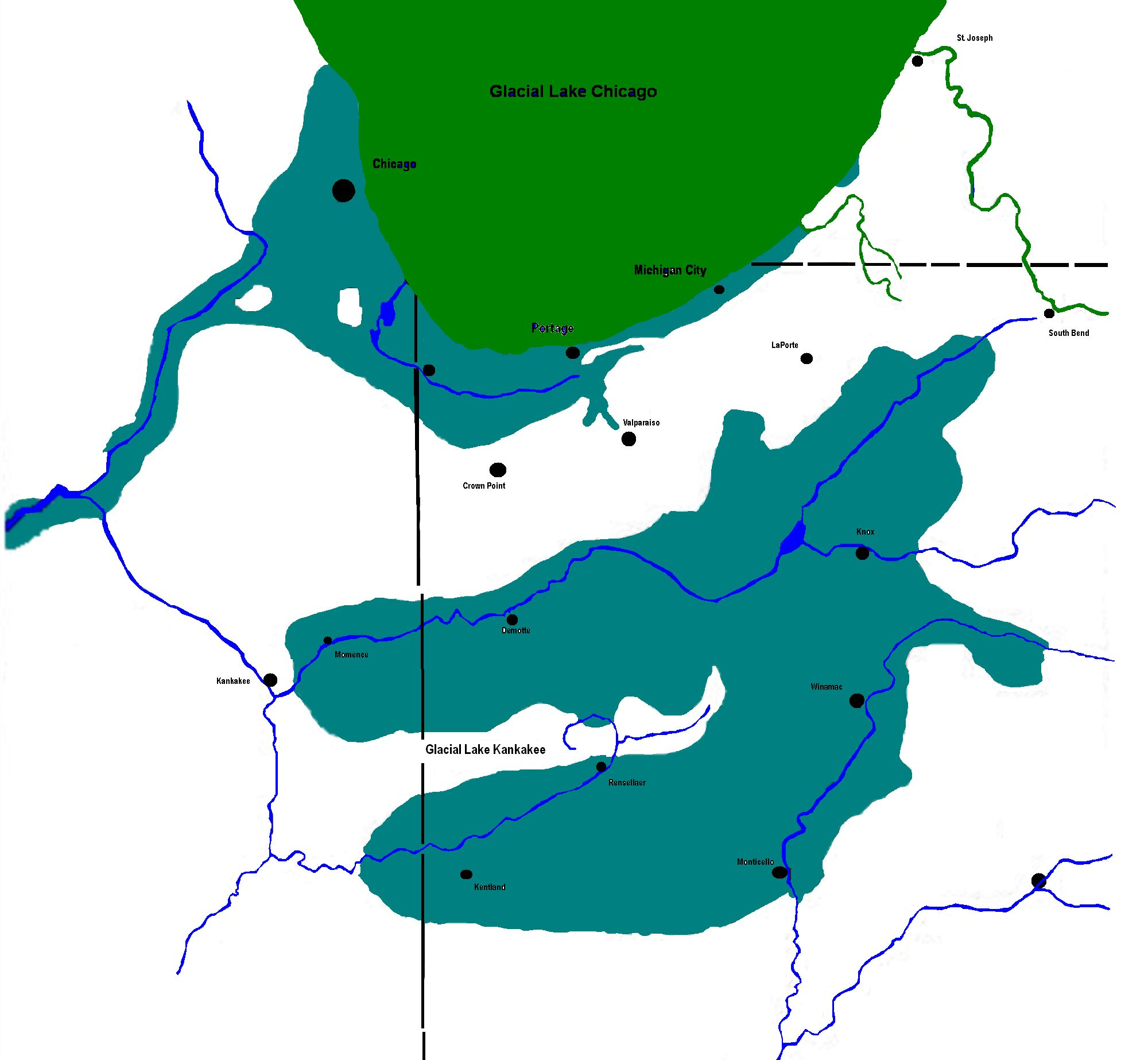
Michigan ice lobe at the Valparaiso Moraine location during the Pleistocene Ice Age. (Leverett, 1899, U.S. Geological Survey)

The Kankakee Torrent was responsible for extensive modification of the Kankakee River and Illinois River river valleys and landforms characteristic of megaflooding. Both the Kankakee River and Illinois River largely follow paths carved out by the torrent, a process that is believed to have taken only days. Most notable today is a region in north-central Illinois known as Starved Rock; while most of Illinois is located on a low-lying plain with little variation in elevation, Starved Rock State Park features several canyons which were created in the Kankakee Torrent. Another, very different, geologic effect left over from the Kankakee Torrent is the existence of "sand prairies". Sand prairies exist where the massive flood waters stopped their movement and deposited large quantities of sand. When European settlers arrived, one remaining sign of these deposits were sand dunes located along parts of the flood's course.

The Kankakee River also bears several features that are direct results of the catastrophic flood. The Kankakee River State Park encompasses all of the types of features that formed as a result of the catastrophic flood event. Along much of its course, tributaries enter the Kankakee over waterfalls, a phenomenon known as "hanging tributaries". This is because the flood carved the Kankakee far deeper than would normal river erosion, and the erosion of the bedrock along the slow-moving tributaries has never caught up. This effect is most evident where Rock Creek joins the Kankakee. The Illinois State Geological Survey reports that Rock Creek is cutting through the dolomite bedrock to the waterfall point, upstream of its confluence with the Kankakee River, at the rate of 3 inches (76 mm) per year.

The effects of the Kankakee Torrent were not limited to northeast Illinois. Both the Ohio and Mississippi Rivers appear to have had their courses altered by the Kankakee Torrent, with the Ohio being pushed further south and the Mississippi further west.

== Flood hypothesis ==
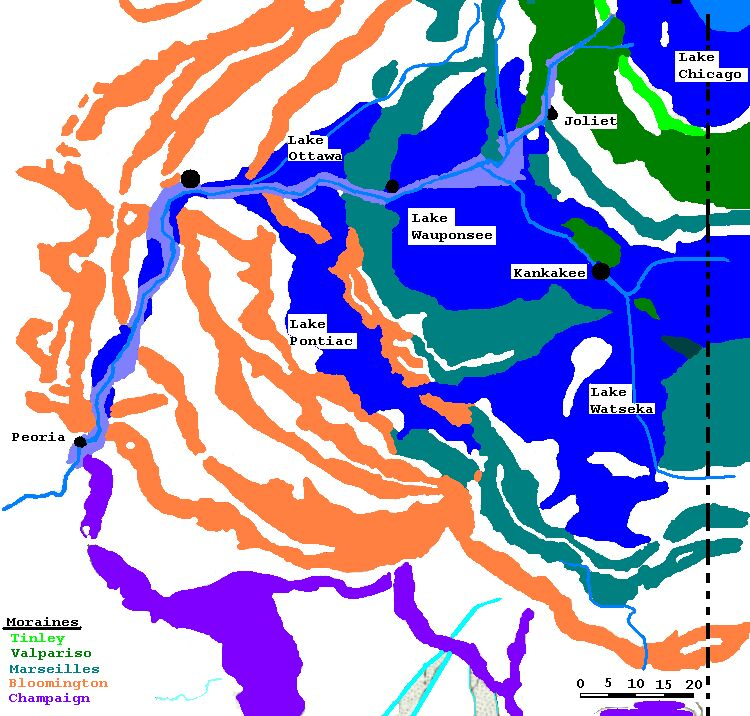
Designed from 1942 - Illinois Glacial Lakes by George, E. Eckblaw

The area is underlain by dolomite bedrock of Silurian age. Pre-glacial erosion of the surface of the bedrock created an irregular surface, allowing the glacial drift to vary in depth over short distances. Some areas are underlain by bedrock near the surface; in other areas it can be 100 feet (30 m) deep. Some hills are solely glacial drift; others may be entirely of limestone.

The water came from the melting "Valparaiso glacier", the glacier that deposited first the Manhattan moraine and then other moraines to the northeast in the Valparaiso morainic system. The melt-water came from three glacial lobes of the Laurentide Ice Sheet. In addition to the melt-water from the Michigan lobe in the Michigan basin, melt-water came from the Huron-Erie lobe to the east in the Maumee valley in Ohio and from the Sturgis Lobe coming out of Michigan across northeast Indiana. The water backed up behind the Marseilles moraine, forming a series of lakes. In the Morris Basin was Lake Wauponsee, which reached east up the Kankakee Valley into Indiana. It flowed south via the Iroquois River into Lake Watseka over the Chatsworth ridge of the Marseilles morainic system to the Vermillion River Valley, past Pontiac, Illinois. The volume of water was blocked at the gap in the Farm Ridge moraine, a unit of the Bloomington morainic system near LaSalle, Illinois. This blockage created Lake Ottawa between Farm Ridge and the Marseilles moraine in the Illinois Valley, and Lake Pontiac between the Cropsey (unit of the Bloomington morainic system), and Marseilles moraines in the Vermilion Valley.

=== Flood ===
The flood did not occur just once, or all at once. It was a repetitive event, over possibly hundreds of years. In the early years it was doubtless small, but as the years passed it became larger and larger until at some time it reached a maximum, and then, as the Valparaiso glacier receded, it gradually subsided. Before the torrent, the valley of the Kankakee River near the city of Kankakee, Illinois, was neither deep nor broad. It was a wide plain of Marseilles drift, with a small river. The early outflows spread across this plain. At its highest level, the torrent found channels in the Minooka ridge and flowed across the ridge to the drift plain in the west. As the outflows continued, the Marseilles drift plain in the east was eroded. This removed much of the drift and even began eroding into the Silurian dolomite beneath. In the last stages, channels were cut in the bedrock.

The area along the southern bank of the Kankakee River, west of Kankakee, Illinois, consists of long narrow ridges leading to the northwest. These are gravel bars from the Kankakee outwash. The force of outflow scoured some of the dolomite bedrock, which can be seen in the gravel bars. The heavy flow of water transported boulders downstream and moved glacial erratics from the tills. The faster flow towards center created a channel, which the modern river still follows. Floodwaters were confined to the inter-moraine channels, which moved it west, then to the south. Upon reaching the LaSalle, Illinois, area, the flood entered the ancestral Mississippi valley, now abandoned. The area where the old Mississippi valley was joined is called the Big Bend of the Illinois River.

== Outwash ==
Outwash from the glacier was carried beyond the Kankakee area. The coarser outwash, consisting of the coarser pieces of the local drift and of rubble ripped from the bedrock, became bars along the river. At the end of the outflow, the lighter sands and silts were deposited in bars and across the valley floor. The sand was picked up by the wind, creating sand dunes to the south and southeast. Sand bars can be found as far south as Sand Ridge State Forest in central Illinois.

== See also ==
- Lake Kankakee
- Grand Kankakee Marsh
- Kankakee Outwash Plain
- Proglacial lake
- List of prehistoric lakes
- Great Lakes
