= Claypool, Indiana =

- Town
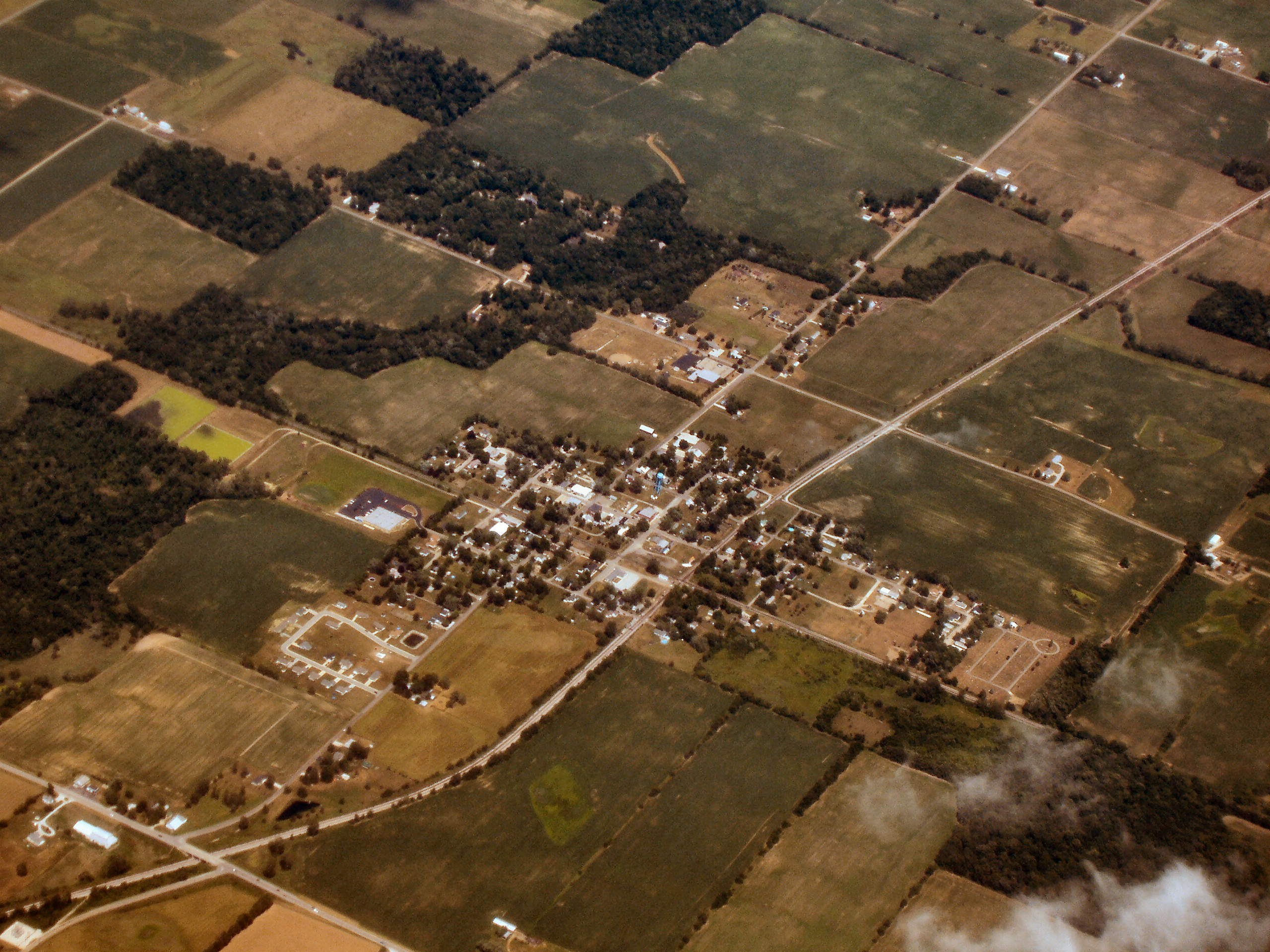
- Claypool from the air, looking northeast.

- Flag

- Location of Claypool in Kosciusko County, Indiana
- Coordinates: 41°07′40″N 85°52′51″W
- Country: United States
- State: Indiana
- County: Kosciusko
- Township: Clay

Area
  - Total: 0.25 sq mi (0.65 km^{2})
  - Land: 0.24 sq mi (0.63 km^{2})
  - Water: 0.0077 sq mi (0.02 km^{2})
- Elevation: 883 ft (269 m)

Population (2020)
  - Total: 396
  - Density: 1,622.2/sq mi (626.32/km^{2})
- Time zone: UTC-5 (Eastern (EST))
  - Summer (DST): UTC-5 (EST)
- ZIP code: 46510
- Area code: 574
- FIPS code: 18-13312
- GNIS feature ID: 2396651
- Website: townofclaypool.org

Claypool is a town in Clay Township, Kosciusko County, in the U.S. state of Indiana. The population was 396 at the 2020 census.

== History ==
Claypool was platted in 1873. The post office at Claypool has been in operation since 1841.

Claypool was previously an important rail transportation hub because it was located at the junction of the Big Four and the Nickel Plate railroad lines.

Claypool is the hometown of two of Indiana's basketball greats, Judi Warren, who became the first Indiana Miss Basketball in 1976, and Kevin Ault, Indiana Mr. Basketball of 1996. Both played for Warsaw Community High School. Judi Warren was inducted into the Indiana Basketball Hall of Fame in 2002.

The town was also notable for the controversial local house church established for a time in the 1970s by Hobart Freeman.

Claypool was featured in an article in Time magazine in its September 8, 1980, issue.

In 2006 Claypool was selected by Louis Dreyfus Agriculture Industries, a Dutch Corporation, as the location for a new biodiesel manufacturing plant, which is now the largest integrated soybean processing and biodiesel plant in the United States

== Geography ==
According to the 2010 census, Claypool has a total area of 0.25 square miles (0.65 km^{2}), of which 0.24 square miles (0.62 km^{2}) (or 96%) is land and 0.01 square miles (0.03 km^{2}) (or 4%) is water.

== Demographics ==
Historical population
| Census | Pop. | Note | %± |
|---|---|---|---|
| 1900 | 399 | | — |
| 1910 | 408 | | 2.3% |
| 1920 | 356 | | −12.7% |
| 1930 | 382 | | 7.3% |
| 1940 | 423 | | 10.7% |
| 1950 | 416 | | −1.7% |
| 1960 | 452 | | 8.7% |
| 1970 | 468 | | 3.5% |
| 1980 | 464 | | −0.9% |
| 1990 | 411 | | −11.4% |
| 2000 | 311 | | −24.3% |
| 2010 | 431 | | 38.6% |
| 2020 | 396 | | −8.1% |
U.S. Decennial Census

=== 2010 census ===
As of the census of 2010, there were 431 people, 155 households, and 115 families residing in the town. The population density was 1,795.8 inhabitants per square mile (693.4/km^{2}). There were 176 housing units at an average density of 733.3 per square mile (283.1/km^{2}). The racial makeup of the town was 95.1% White, 0.2% African American, 0.7% Native American, 0.9% Asian, 1.4% from other races, and 1.6% from two or more races. Hispanic or Latino of any race were 5.1% of the population.

There were 155 households, of which 37.4% had children under the age of 18 living with them, 51.6% were married couples living together, 14.2% had a female householder with no husband present, 8.4% had a male householder with no wife present, and 25.8% were non-families. 20.0% of all households were made up of individuals, and 5.1% had someone living alone who was 65 years of age or older. The average household size was 2.78 and the average family size was 3.13.

The median age in the town was 33 years. 26.7% of residents were under the age of 18; 11.2% were between the ages of 18 and 24; 27.8% were from 25 to 44; 23.9% were from 45 to 64; and 10.4% were 65 years of age or older. The gender makeup of the town was 50.3% male and 49.7% female.

=== 2000 census ===
As of the census of 2000, there were 311 people, 112 households, and 88 families residing in the town. The population density was 861.7 inhabitants per square mile (332.7/km^{2}). There were 127 housing units at an average density of 351.9 per square mile (135.9/km^{2}). The racial makeup of the town was 97.75% White, 0.96% Native American, 0.96% from other races, and 0.32% from two or more races. Hispanic or Latino of any race were 1.29% of the population.

There were 112 households, out of which 41.1% had children under the age of 18 living with them, 58.9% were married couples living together, 13.4% had a female householder with no husband present, and 21.4% were non-families. 17.0% of all households were made up of individuals, and 7.1% had someone living alone who was 65 years of age or older. The average household size was 2.78 and the average family size was 3.15.

In the town, the population was spread out, with 29.3% under the age of 18, 10.6% from 18 to 24, 29.6% from 25 to 44, 19.0% from 45 to 64, and 11.6% who were 65 years of age or older. The median age was 32 years. For every 100 females, there were 99.4 males. For every 100 females age 18 and over, there were 96.4 males.

The median income for a household in the town was $33,833, and the median income for a family was $34,792. Males had a median income of $29,583 versus $18,333 for females. The per capita income for the town was $12,021. About 7.9% of families and 9.5% of the population were below the poverty line, including 8.0% of those under age 18 and 11.1% of those age 65 or over.

== Town flag ==
The official town flag for Claypool, Indiana. Created by local elementary students. The flag represents several facets of the town's history.

As of April 17, 2018, Claypool has had an official town flag. The flag was created by students at Claypool Elementary and presented to the town council, who voted to approve the flag design. The flag consists of two solid black lines representing the railroad tracks which run through the town, and were important in the town's history as mentioned above. The three stars represent the three main crops grown in the area; corn, wheat, and soybeans. The colors of the flag are orange, black, and white symbolizing the former Claypool High School and current Claypool Elementary School. Orange also represents basketball as the town is home to the state's first Miss Basketball and the 1996 Mr. Basketball. The date, 1873, shows when the town was platted.
