= Maumee Torrent =

Catastrophic draining of Lake Maumee

The Maumee Torrent, also known as the Maumee Megaflood, was a catastrophic draining of Lake Maumee, the ancestor of present-day Lake Erie, that occurred approximately 14,000 to 17,000 years ago during the late Wisconsin glaciation. It happened when the waters of Lake Maumee, possibly in response to an advance of the ice front at the eastern end of the lake, overtopped a "sag" or low spot in the Fort Wayne Moraine, which was a deposit of glacial debris that acted as a natural dam at the site of present-day Fort Wayne, Indiana. This unleashed a massive flow of water that scoured a one- to two-mile-wide outlet running southwest to the Wabash River known as the "Wabash-Erie Channel", which probably followed the course of earlier, less massive drainage. The channel, now a small stream called the Little River, is the largest topographical feature in Allen County, Indiana. As much as 30 feet of fine sand, silt and organic sediments were deposited in the channel before drainage reversed and was captured by the present-day Maumee River. U.S. Route 24 between Fort Wayne and Huntington follows the channel.

Approximately 14,000 years before present, Lake Maumee overtopped the Fort Wayne Moraine. The flood removed all earlier sediment and deepened the valley bottom by 20 feet (6.1 m). Lake Maumee had reached 800 feet (240 m) above sea level when the lake poured through a sag in the Fort Wayne Moraine into the ancestral Little River and then the Wabash River. There is some evidence that the final rise in lake level that caused it to overtop the moraine was caused by a minor re-advance of the glacier further east in the basin. The soft till of the moraine was quickly eroded by the volume of water in the lake, releasing a massive volume of water. A second outlet opened at Six-Mile Creek into the St. Marys River and into the Little River Valley. The earlier sediments were removed in bulk, leaving only the Sand Point and a few gravel terraces on the valley walls. The flood scoured the length of the Wabash River. The limestone bedrock under the Little River Valley near Huntington created a sill, limiting the depth to which the Torrent and the future river could erode. The well-developed beach ridges in Ohio and eastern Allen County show a series of lower lake levels.
