= Marseilles moraine =

Terminal moraine at Lake Michigan

Coordinates: 41°30′N 88°00′W

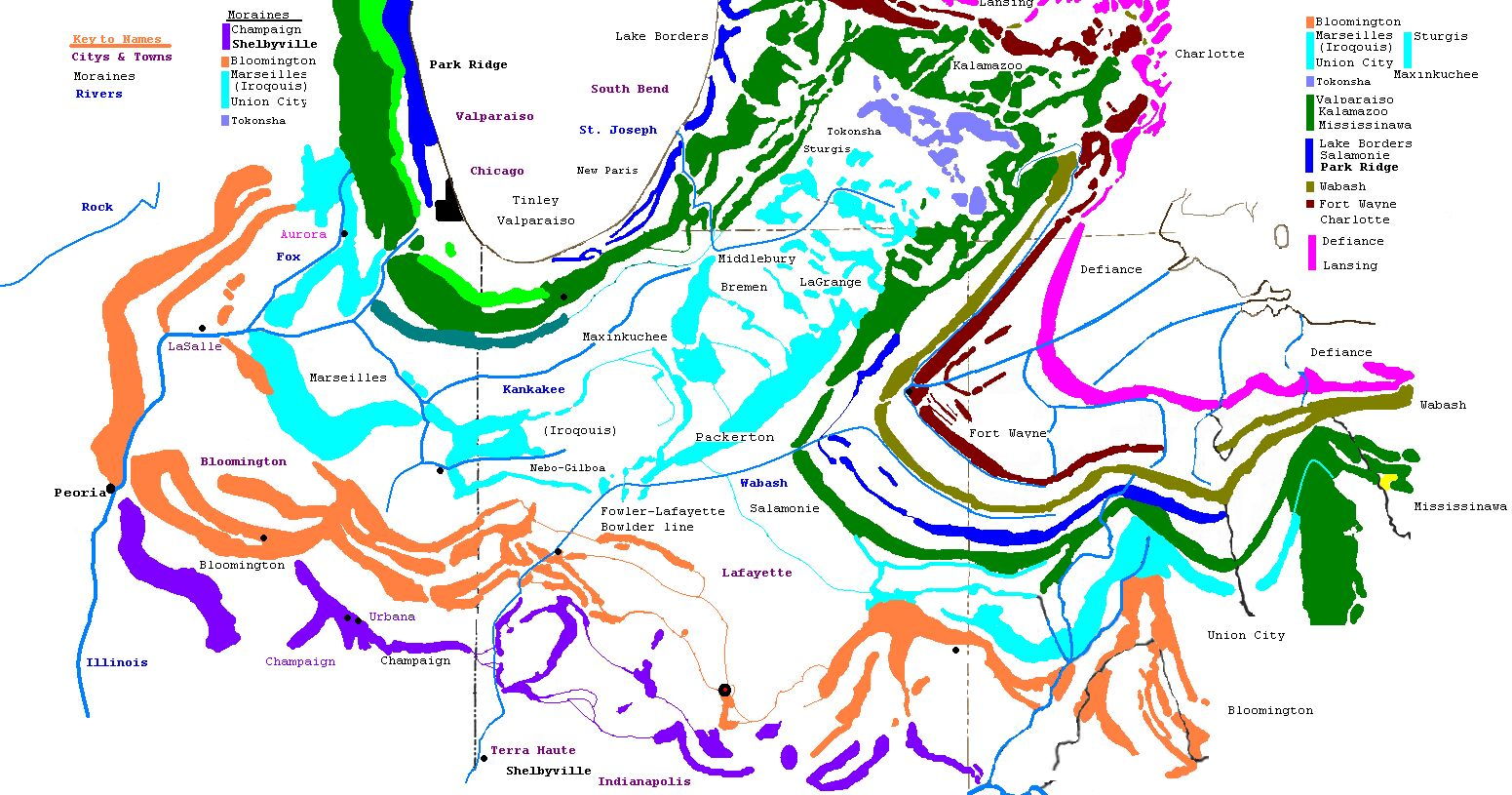
Moraines south of Lake Michigan and southwest of Lake Erie. A composite of three maps (Leverett 1915) (Leverett 1902) (Larsen 1986) and other sources. Colors represent moraines from the same time period of the Wisconsin Glacial epoch

The Marseilles moraine is a terminal moraine that encircles the southern tip of Lake Michigan in North America. It begins near Elgin, Illinois, and extends south and west of Chicago metropolitan area, turning eastward 30 miles (48 km) to 40 miles (64 km) south of the lake in Kankakee and Iroqouis counties, entering Indiana. It formed during the Wisconsin glaciation. The glacier had been in retreat when it stopped for an extended period, depositing glacial till and sand creating the hills of the moraine.

== Distribution ==
The Marseilles moraine was preceded by the Bloomington morainic system. The name is taken from the village of Marseilles, located where the Illinois River cuts through the moraine. The moraine is readily traced as far north as South Elgin, 4 miles (6.4 km) south of the city of Elgin, where it is lost in a composite of other materials. For 25 miles (40 km)south it combined with a till ridge called the Minooka Ridge. This follows the east side of Fox River, past St. Charles, Geneva, Batavia, and Aurora. The east side of each city occupies the outer face of the moraine. The width of the belt is 2 miles (3.2 km) or 3 miles (4.8 km). The moraine continues south along the line of Will and Kendall counties. It runs about 2 miles (3.2 km) or 3 miles (4.8 km) beyond the river. The Marseilles moraine turns west, at the bluff between Oswego and Yorkville. The Minooka Ridge continues southward to the Illinois River. The Marseilles moraine follows nearly the southeast bluff of Fox River to the mouth of the stream, its outer border being nowhere more than 4 miles (6.4 km) and usually less than 1 mile (1.6 km) from the stream. The width in Kendall County is only 2 or 3 miles, but increases to 5 or 6 miles in northeastern LaSalle County, near the north bluff of the Illinois River. At the Illinois Valley, it changes from south-southwest to a south-southeast course. It maintains a 3 miles (4.8 km) to 5 miles (8.0 km) width through southeastern Lasalle and northern Livington counties. It is associated with Farm Ridge, in Livingston County. The Farm Ridge is an inner ridge of the Bloomington system. In the vicinity of Odell the moraine turns eastward, and near the line of Livingston and Ford counties takes a course northeast, in broad curve of 8 miles (13 km) or 10 miles (16 km) wide. Reaching the vicinity of Ste. Anne where it turns southeast.

== Iroquois moraine (continuation) ==
From Ste. Anne, it continues to the southeast, reaching the state line. Here the name changes to the Iroquois. Continuing through Newton and Jasper counties, Indiana. The moraine expands to cover a 3 miles (4.8 km) to 6 miles (9.7 km) in width across the landscapes as far as Medaryville, in Pulaski County, Indiana. To the east, it disappears. It may end here, or its remnants may be obscured beneath the Lake Kankakee sand ridges. The rise from the plain to the crest of the moraine on the north amounts to 20 to 40 feet (6.1 to 12.2 m) high about 2 miles (3.2 km) and on the south to 30 feet (9.1 m) to 50 feet (15 m) in less than 1 mile (1.6 km). The width of the " Iroquois " moraine is generally between 2 and 4 miles (3.2 and 6.4 km), but bouldery areas on its north border extend about 2 miles (3.2 km) farther north to the southern edge of an extensive sandy plain traversed by Kankakee River. The southern border of the ‘’Iroquois" moraine lies 1 mile (1.6 km) to 4 miles (6.4 km) north of Iroquois River in Newton and Jasper counties and trends southwest and northeast. In eastern Jasper it turns northward. It dies out as a definite ridge 4 or 5 miles (6.4 or 8.0 km) south of Kankakee River. Some uncertainty remains on whether it continues to the east. One possible correlative is a moraine, which begins near Bass Lake, in Starke County. Between eastern Jasper County and Bass Lake, the area is generally sand covered, with a broad low ridge running from the north end of the Iroquois moraine at San Pierre to North Judson. This ridge has patches of boulders in the till line from North Judson to Bass Lake, as do many other moraines in northern Indiana. The moraine from Bass Lake runs to the southeast and was formed by the Saginaw lobe, of the Laruentide glacier and is the outer border of the great Maxinkuckee moraine.

== Altitude and topography ==
The crest is around 750 feet (230 m) above sea level and varies only about 25 feet (7.6 m). The outer border of the moraine follows closely along the 650 feet (200 m) contour line along its border. The inside border runs close to the 700 feet (210 m). The Marseilles moraine has a well-defined crest, which acts as a watershed divide. North of the Illinois River it lies between the Fox River and the Dupage River, Au Sable Creek, and Nettle Creek. South of Illinois lies between the Vermilion Rivers tributaries and the Kankakee River. A branch of it that runs north of the Iroquois River and south of Kankakee River is split by the Iroquois River at several places. The sharpest relief is in Kendall County, Illinois a ridge stands 30 feet (9.1 m) to 40 feet (12 m) above the adjacent part of the moraine. This is unusual, as the crest is a broad undulating ridge of 1 mile (1.6 km) to 2 miles (3.2 km) in width, with depression that is seasonally water filled. The majority of the crest is a series of swells seldom exceeding 20 feet (6.1 m)with easy slopes. In Livingston County the swells reach 50 feet (15 m) above the surrounding sloughs. Another prominent set of knolls are along the Kankakee and Iroqouis counties. Here the knolls reach 75 feet (23 m) or more above the surrounding moraine. The highest points noted on the Marseilles system in the district north of Iroquois River are north of Rensselaer, where an altitude of 760 feet (230 m) to 755 feet (230 m) above sea level is attained. Much of the moraine reaches between 700 feet (210 m) and 725 feet (221 m).

== Outwash ==
Along Fox River, in Kane and Kendall counties, a belt of coarse gravel lines the outside of the Marseilles moraine. The deposit lay mostly across the river from the moraine. At Batavia it is chiefly on the west side, at Aurora on the east side, and at Yorkville on the west side. The gravel is so extensive in Kane and Kendal counties and so small farther down Fox River as to suggest that it forms a delta. In the vicinity of the Illinois River, there are indications of a lake-like expansion of outflowing waters. The Illinois Valley, therefore, appears to have been unopened along the section between the Marseilles moraine and the inner moraine of the Bloomington series. The basin now drained by the Iroquois River into the Kankakee was blocked by ice in that direction. The outlet would have been west across the rim of the basin in northern Ford County into the east fork of Vermilion River. Evidence of fine sand and silt covering the till plain show that a Lake Watseka occupied this part of the Iroquois valley.

== See also ==
- Terminal moraine
- Geography of Indiana
- List of glacial moraines

Glacial features, north to south from Lake Michigan:

- Calumet Shoreline
- Glenwood Shoreline
- Tinley Moraine
- Valparaiso Moraine
- Kankakee Outwash Plain
