= Hamilton Southeastern High School =

Location
- 13910 East 126th Street; Fishers, Indiana 46037; United States; 39°58′15″N 85°55′00″W

Information
- Type: Public high school
- Motto: Promote Respect, Foster Pride, Inspire Excellence
- Established: 1964
- School district: Hamilton Southeastern Schools
- CEEB code: 151045
- Principal: Craig McCaffrey
- Teaching staff: 166.99 (FTE)
- Grades: 9–12
- Enrollment: 3,445 (2023-2024)
- Color
- Athletics conference: Hoosier Crossroads Conference
- Nickname: Royals
- Newspaper: Orb
- Yearbook: Sceptre
- Website: hhs.hseschools.org

Hamilton Southeastern High School (HSE or HSHS) is a public secondary school in Fishers, Indiana, United States. It is a part of the Hamilton Southeastern School District.

== History ==
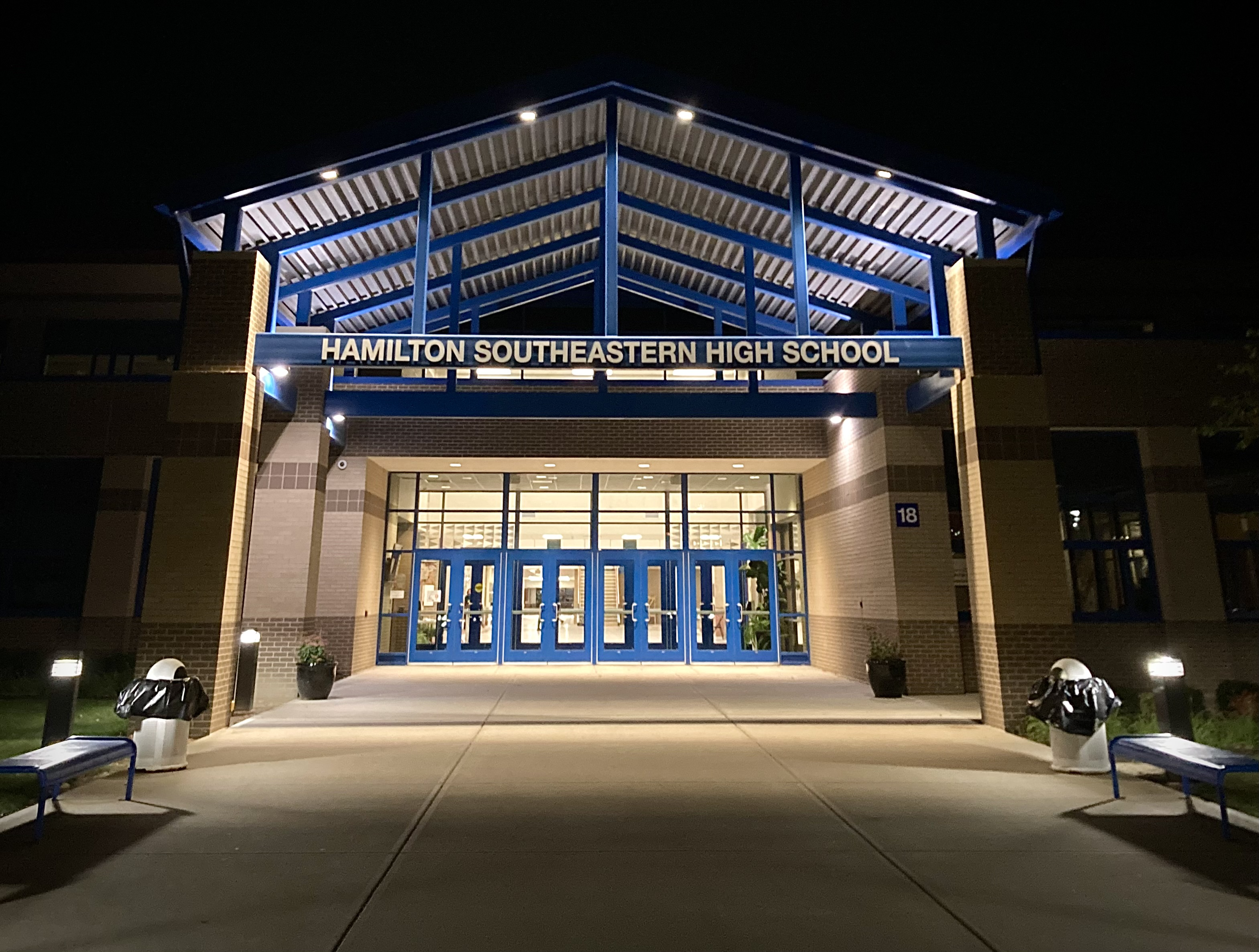
Hamilton Southeastern High School at night.

Location: Fishers, Indiana USA

Founded: 1964

During the 2003–2004 school year, the Hamilton Southeastern school district opened the Hamilton Southeastern High School Freshman Campus, which would house the district's high school freshmen until the 2006–2007 school year. In the fall of 2006, the HSE Freshman Campus became the second high school in the HSE school district, Fishers High School. In summer 2009, the cafeteria was expanded to accommodate more students.

A new cafeteria and hallway replaced much of the original HSE High School courtyard in the summer of 2010. The addition was part of a $1.5 million project to combat overcrowding and help ease foot traffic.

In 2012, freshmen were put into a Freshman Campus at the location of the old junior high until the senior wing addition, which opened for the 2015–2016 school year, was complete. The Freshman Campus then became Fall Creek Junior High School.

Beginning with the 2015–2016 school year, the newly built College and Career Academy was opened for students.

== Academics ==
Hamilton Southeastern High School became a National Blue Ribbon School for 2004–2005, being in the top 4% of schools nationwide.

== Athletics ==
The Royals have won 15 IHSAA state championships, the second most in the Hoosier Crossroads Conference behind Noblesville, who has won 19. They have also won 4 boys' lacrosse championships, through the IHSLA, the state's governing body in lacrosse. All state titles are in the highest division unless noted.

- Baseball: 2019
- Boys' Lacrosse (IHSLA): 2018, 2021, 2022, 2024, 2025
- Boys' Swimming: 2007
- Boys' Track: 2013
- Football: 1981 (A)
- Girls' Basketball: 2019
- Girls' Golf: 2003, 2008, 2010, 2011
- Girls Soccer: 2025
- Girls' Track: 2018
- Softball: 2007, 2010, 2024
- Volleyball: 2022, 2023

== Performing Arts ==
Hamilton Southeastern High School features a variety of performing arts, including band, orchestra, choir, and much more. Each section has different advancement levels for their groups, from beginner to advance in each art. The HSE Drama Club and Thespian Troupe 520 is also prevalent, every year hosting a play in the fall, a musical in the spring, and a Thespian show at the end of the year.

== Clubs ==
Hamilton Southeastern High School is home to over 80 clubs. The clubs range from religion to cooking to environment to performing arts and a lot more.

== Notable alumni ==
- Sam Bachman - professional baseball pitcher for the Los Angeles Angels of Major League Baseball (drafted 18th overall, 2020 MLB draft
- Randy Gregory - NFL defensive end for the Tampa Bay Buccaneers; former second-round pick (2015)
- Gary Harris - NBA player for the Orlando Magic, Indiana Mr. Basketball winner (2012)
- Zak Irvin - Irvin, professional basketball player; former Michigan Wolverines standout, Indiana Mr. Basketball winner (2013), Parade All-American
- Sydney Parrish - college basketball player; Indiana Miss Basketball (2020), played for the Oregon Ducks before transferring to and competing with the Indiana Hoosiers
- Joe Reitz - former NFL offensive tackle for the Indianapolis Colts, Miami Dolphins, and Baltimore Ravens.

Staff

- John Stollmeyer - former US national soccer team player; head soccer coach at HSE

== See also ==
- List of high schools in Indiana
