= Clay Township, Kosciusko County, Indiana =

Clay Township
- Township
- Coordinates: 41°07′58″N 85°50′44″W
- Country: United States
- State: Indiana
- County: Kosciusko

Government
  - Type: Indiana township

Area
  - Total: 29.81 sq mi (77.2 km^{2})
  - Land: 29.11 sq mi (75.4 km^{2})
  - Water: 0.7 sq mi (1.8 km^{2})
- Elevation: 892 ft (272 m)

Population (2020)
  - Total: 1,657
  - Density: 58.8/sq mi (22.7/km^{2})
- Time zone: UTC-5 (Eastern (EST))
  - Summer (DST): UTC-4 (EDT)
- FIPS code: 18-13114
- GNIS feature ID: 453212

Clay Township is one of the 17 townships in Kosciusko County, Indiana, United States. As of the 2020 census, its population was 1,657, a decrease from 1,712 at 2010 and it contained 753 housing units.

== Geography ==
According to the 2010 census, the township has a total area of 29.81 square miles (77.2 km^{2}), of which 29.11 square miles (75.4 km^{2}) (or 97.65%) is land and 0.7 square miles (1.8 km^{2}) (or 2.35%) is water.

=== Cities and towns ===
- Claypool

=== Unincorporated towns ===
- Packerton at 41.1164336°N 85.7974880°W

(This list is based on USGS data and may include former settlements.)
