= Sydney Parrish =

American basketball player (born 2001)

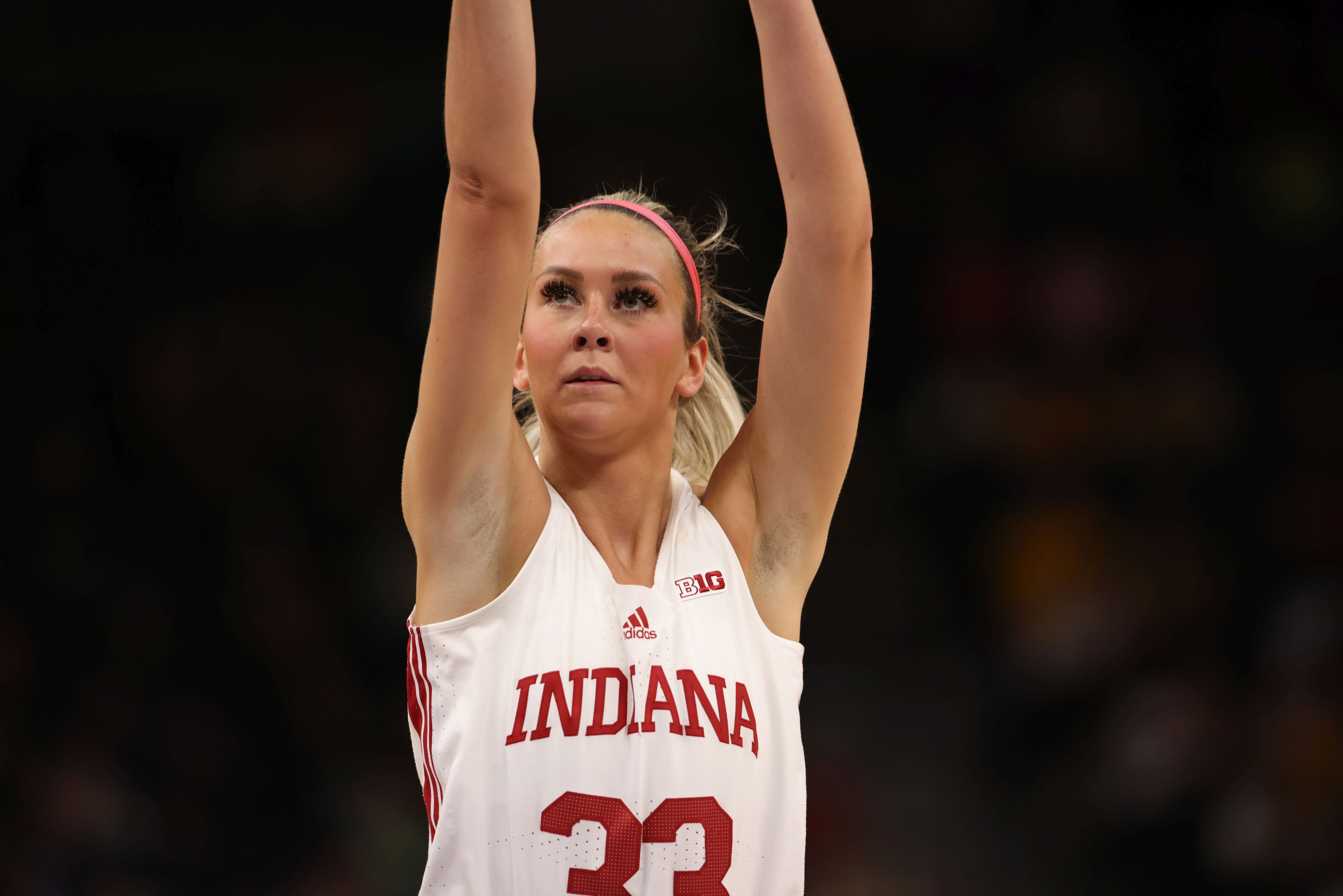
- Parrish taking a shot during the 2023 Big Ten Tournament

Personal information
- Born: October 10, 2001 (age 24)
- Listed height: 6 ft 2 in (1.88 m)

Career information
- High school: Hamilton Southeastern (Fishers, Indiana)
- College: Oregon (2020–2022); Indiana (2022–2025)
- WNBA draft: 2025: undrafted
- Position: Guard
- Number: 33

Career highlights
- McDonald's All-American (2020); Indiana Miss Basketball (2020)

Sydney Parrish (born October 10, 2001) is an American former basketball player. She played college basketball for the Indiana Hoosiers and Oregon Ducks. In 2020, she was named Indiana Miss Basketball.

== High school career ==
Parrish played basketball at Hamilton Southeastern High School in Fishers, Indiana. During her junior year, she averaged 21.0 points, 6.9 rebounds, 2.5 assists, 1.9 steals, and 1.0 blocks per game, which contributed 30 points and 10 rebounds in the state final victory over Lawrence North High School. As a senior, she averaged 24.8 points, 8.0 rebounds, and 2.4 steals per game. She led her team to the IHSAA Class 4A state championship in 2019. In 2020, she won the Indiana Miss Basketball award.

== College career ==
Parrish started playing basketball at the University of Oregon in 2020. She averaged 6.0 points and 2.7 rebounds per game as a freshman. In her sophomore year, she played in 32 games and averaged 8.5 points and 3.3 rebounds per game.

In 2022, Parrish transferred to Indiana University Bloomington. She was named an All-Big Ten Honorable Mention in 2023.

== Career statistics ==
Season averages
Year	Team	GP	GS	MIN	Points	FG%	3P%	FT%	RPG	APG	STL	BLK
2020-21	Oregon	23	2	16.7	6.0	33.6	33.3	89.7	2.7	0.7	1.0	0.3
2021-22	Oregon	32	32	24.7	8.5	38.5	35.4	75.0	3.3	1.0	1.0	0.2
2022-23	Indiana	32	26	29.1	12.0	44.8	36.7	71.4	5.4	1.8	1.6	0.7
2023-24	Indiana	25	24	27.4	10.8	45.3	40.0	79.2	6.0	2.3	0.9	0.7
2024-25	Indiana	28	28	30.4	11.6	44.0	33.3	74.6	5.5	1.9	1.3	0.8
Career		140	112	26.0	9.9	42.0	35.9	75.9	4.6	1.5	1.2	0.6
