= Terminal moraine =

Type of moraine that forms at the terminal of a glacier

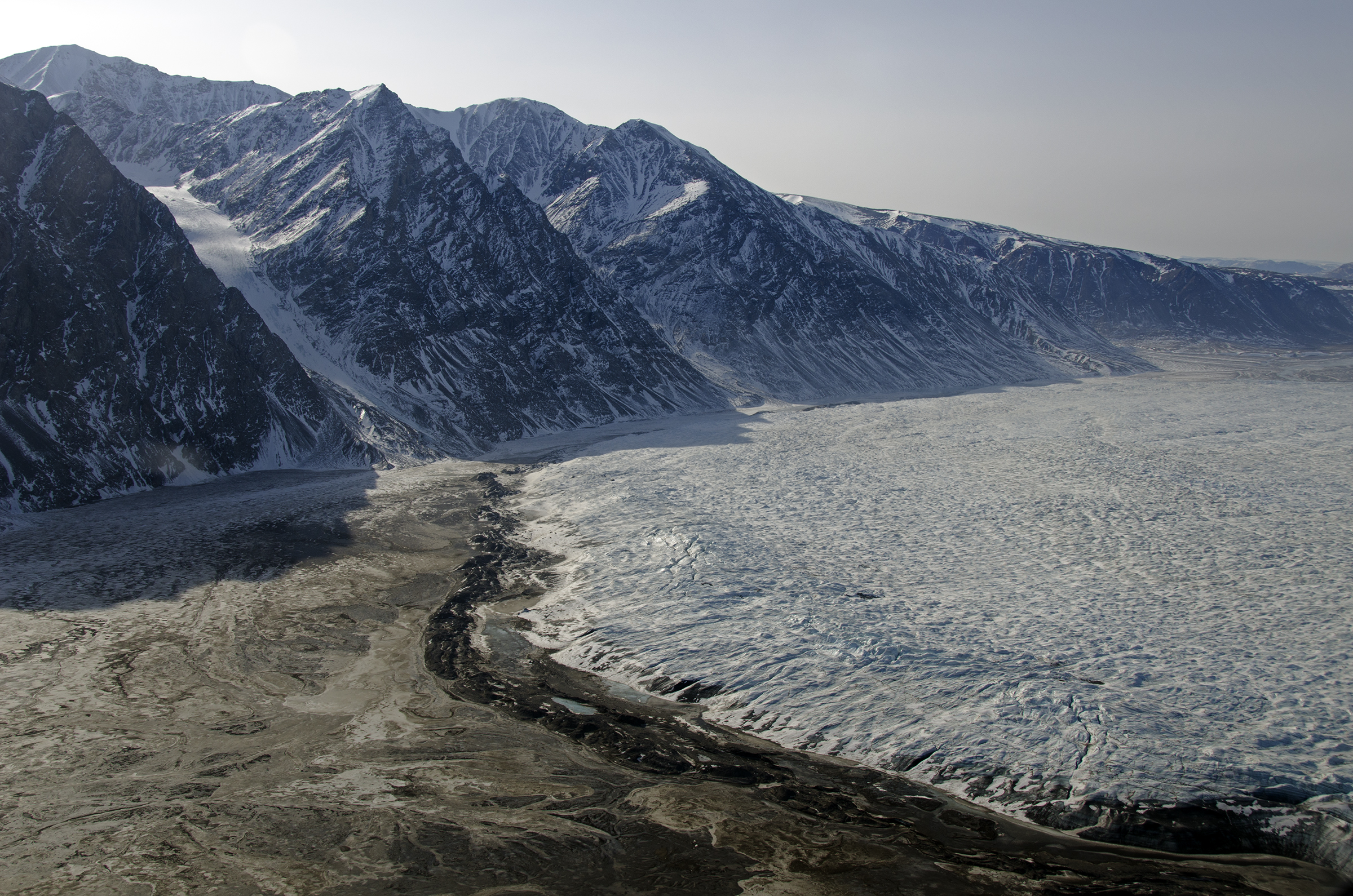
Terminal moraine of Wordie Glacier, Greenland

Map of the Salpausselkä terminal moraines in Southern Finland

A terminal moraine, also called an end moraine, is a type of moraine that forms at the terminal (edge) of a glacier, marking its maximum advance. At this point, debris that has accumulated by plucking and abrasion, which has been pushed by the front edge of the ice, is driven no further and instead is deposited in an unsorted pile of sediment. Because the glacier acts very much like a conveyor belt, the longer it stays in one place, the greater the amount of material that will be deposited. The moraine is left as the marking point of the terminal extent of the ice.

== Formation ==
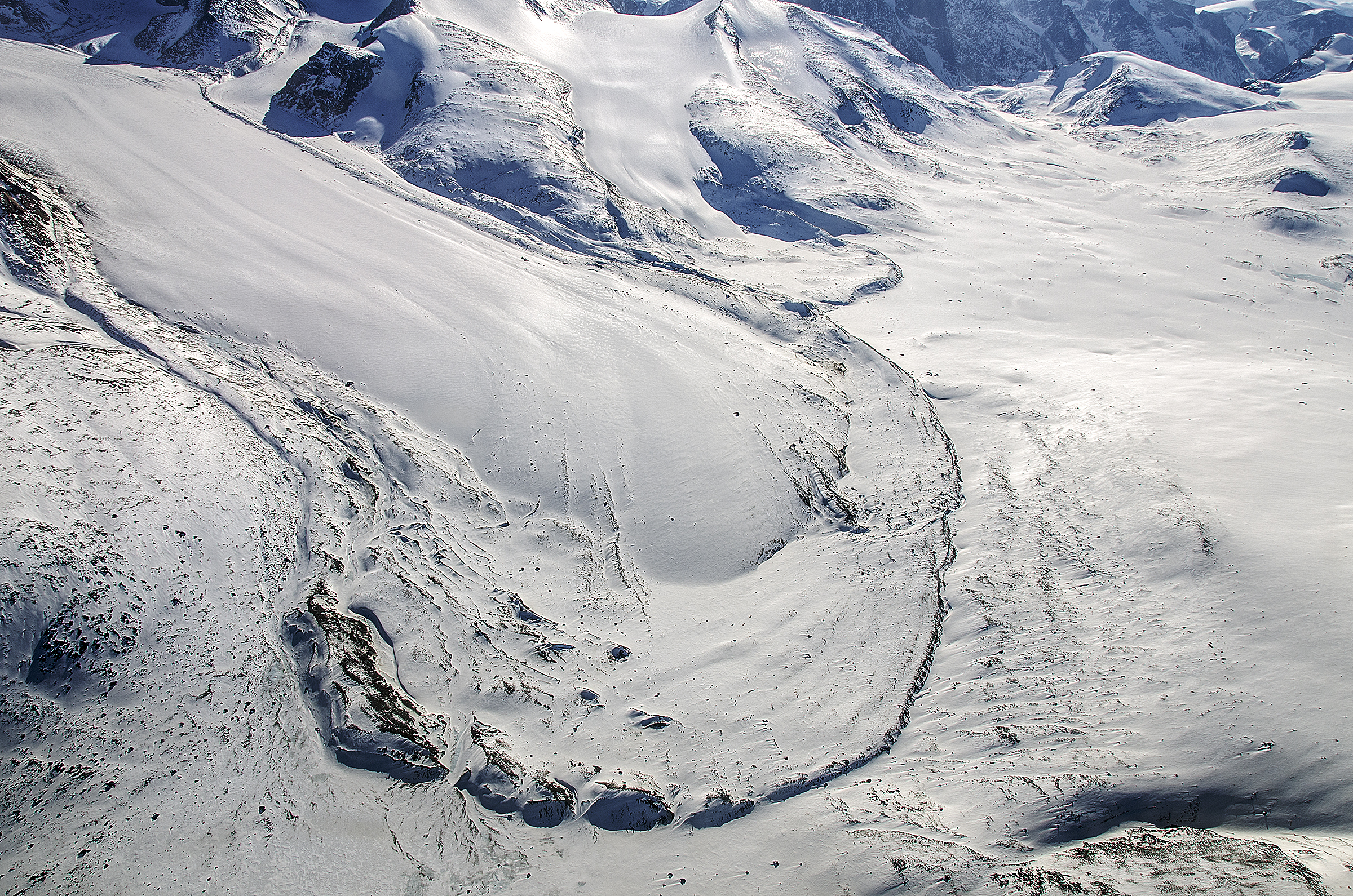
Terminal moraine of Penny Ice Cap, Baffin Island, Nunavut, Canada

As a glacier moves along its path, the surrounding area is continuously eroding. Loose rock and pieces of bedrock are constantly being picked up and transported with the glacier. Fine sediment and particles are also incorporated into the glacial ice. The accumulation of these rocks and sediment together form what is called glacial till when deposited.

Push moraines are formed when a glacier retreats from a previously deposited terminal moraine, only to push proglacial sediment or till into an existing terminal moraine. This process can make the existing terminal moraine far larger than its previous size.

Dump moraines occur when rock, sediment, and debris, which accumulate at the top surface of the glacier, either slide, fall, or flow off of the snout of the glacier. The accumulation of till will form a terminal moraine as the glacier retreats.

Ablation moraines form when a large piece of ice, containing an accumulation of sediment and debris, breaks from the snout of the glacial. Once it is separated and begins to melt, the debris found throughout this glacial piece is deposited to form a new terminal moraine. The more debris that is found within the ice, the longer it will take for complete melting to occur.

Climate plays an important role in the formation of terminal moraines. As temperatures increase, glaciers begin to retreat faster, causing more glacial till to be deposited in the form of terminal moraines. However, when temperatures decrease, zone of accumulation goes into overdrive. This starts a process where the accumulation of snow, in the zone of accumulation is greater than loss due to melting or ablation.

== History ==
During the Last Glacial Maximum (LGM), the Northern hemisphere began its modern ice-age. Most of what is now Canada and northern portions of the United States were covered in ice sheets or mountain driven glaciers during the last stage of the Pleistocene Epoch. In the last 400,000 years there have been roughly four major glacial events. Evidence of these separate events is found not only in ice cores, but also in the glacial till that was deposited.

Rocks and sediment not native to one area could be found in a region completely foreign to that from which they were formed. This is the result of a prior terminal moraine being picked up and deposited by a newer glacial event. The terminal moraines resulting from the Last Glacial Maximum are the most informational features about glacial advance still present today.

== Effects on landscape ==
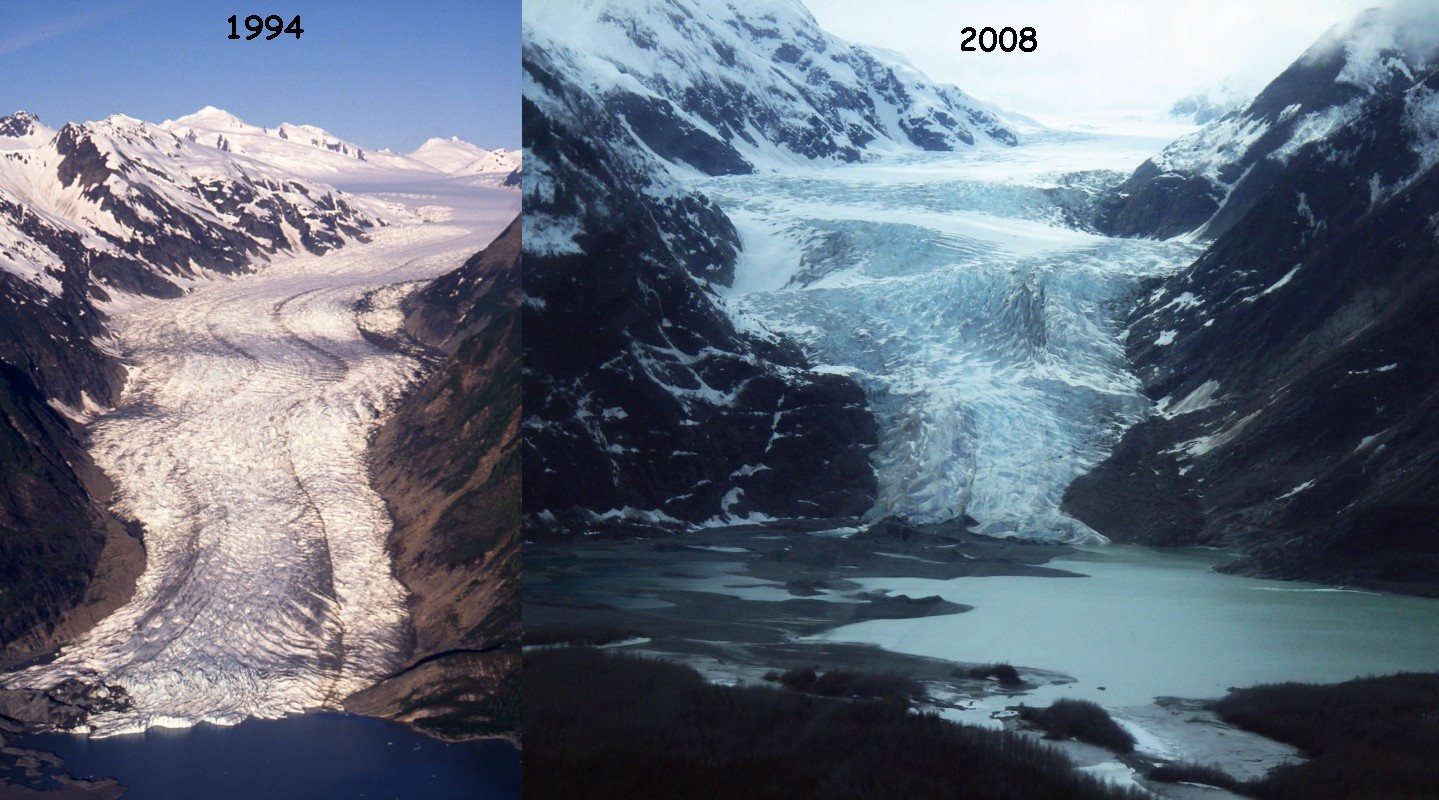
Davidson Glacier, Alaska. There is a glacier-fed lake in addition to the formation of a small channel heading in the southeast direction.

During glacial retreat, meltwater flows in the opposite direction of the retreat, causing braided streams and channels to form. A terminal moraine creates a barrier helping to trap water in a newly-formed glacial lake. The positioning of the lake resulted from not only subsidence, but also the terminal moraine providing the foundation for the wall that holds the water in place. While the terminal moraine consists of a long mound of rock and sediment which forms a structure that appears to be a barrier for water, there are still ways for the water to flow through. Water makes its way through glacial till to form streams and channels.

Another landscape feature formed by terminal moraines are kettle lakes. These are produced during glacial recession when boulders or blocks of ice are left in place as the glacier recedes from the newly deposited terminal moraine. As the ice boulders melt, they begin to pool to form kettle lakes in the glacial outwash plain.

== Effects on vegetation ==
The terminal moraine is the furthest point of disturbed sediment, which is formed into a long mound outlining the front edge of the glacier. This mound typically consists of a large quantity of rocks and boulders along with sediment, and can combine to reach a height of multiple meters. The process of uplifting and moving these large rocks and boulders negatively affects the local vegetation by either crushing them or contributing to the process of the glacier plowing the topsoil, which removes the vegetation from the soil completely, including the root systems. In this area of disturbed land, it is difficult for new vegetation to grow. Immediately beyond the terminal moraine is the glacial outwash plain, covered in a layer of sediment, with braided streams formed from the meltwater. Here, old vegetation is buried by the sediment, but new vegetation can still survive relatively well as long as it can acquire meltwater from the now receding glacier.

== Examples ==
Terminal moraines are one of the most prominent types of moraines in the Arctic. One notable terminal moraine is Trollgarden in Norway, once thought to be magically constructed by trolls.

In North America, the Outer Lands is a name given to the terminal moraine archipelago of the northeastern region of the United States (Cape Cod, Martha's Vineyard, Nantucket, Block Island and Long Island). According to geologist George Frederick Wright some of the most prominent examples of terminal moraines on Long Island are "the most remarkable in the world". Other prominent examples of terminal moraines are the Tinley Moraine and the Valparaiso Moraine, perhaps the best examples of terminal moraines in North America. These moraines are most clearly seen southwest of Chicago.

In Europe, virtually all the terrain in the central Netherlands is made up of an extended terminal moraine. In Switzerland, alpine terminal moraines can be found, one striking example being the moraine at the end of the valley of the Forno Glacier in the south-eastern canton of Graubünden near St. Moritz and the Italian border.

In New Zealand the Franz Josef Glacier on the West Coast has created the terminal moraine called the Waiho Loop.

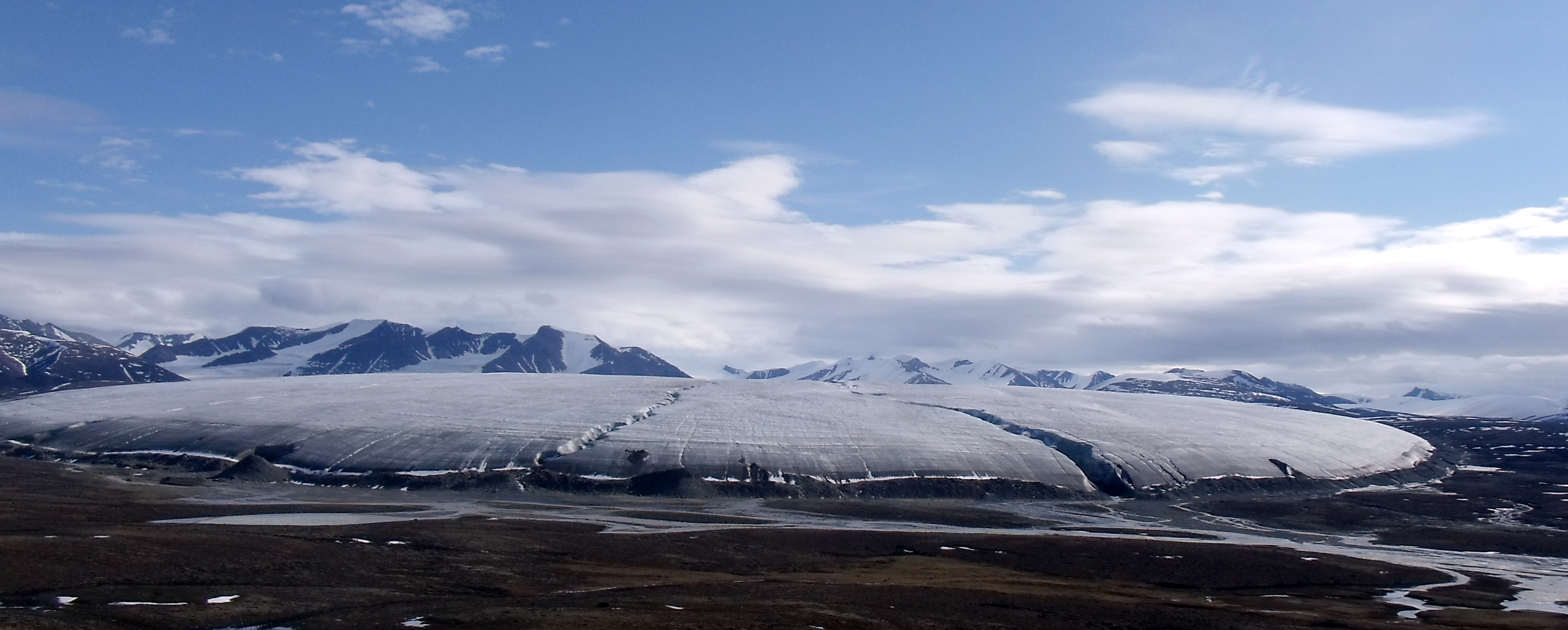
"The Mothership", a 3-mile-wide (4.8 km) terminal lobe of a glacier flowing down from the interior ice cap on top of the Byam Martin Mountains, Bylot Island, Nunavut, Canada. Note the terminal moraine "bulldozed" at the ice front.

== See also ==
- Glacial landform
- List of glacial moraines
- Oak Ridges Moraine
- Outwash plain
- Postglacial rebound
- Push moraine
- Trafalgar Moraine
