= Union Moraine =

Coordinates: 40°15′N 84°40′W

The Union Moraine begins in Ohio, east of Bellefontaine and the highest point in that state, (Campbell Hill, 1,549 feet (472 m)) towards Greenville in Darke County. Traveling southwestward and arcing a little northward, the moraine reaches Union City, Ohio for which it is named. From here, it travels almost directly westward to Muncie, Indiana. From Muncie, the moraine runs northwest ending in the bluffs overlooking Pipe Creek at Bunker Hill, Indiana, just south of Peru on the Wabash River.

The ‘’’Union City Moraine’’ is the outer ring of a series of moraines created by the Huron-Erie lobe of the Laurentian Glacier. The moraine has no significant feature, but represents a late surge in the glacial lobe. The moraine in east-central Indiana is covered with low relief ice-disintegration ridges and hummocks crossed by many ice-walled channels and eskers. This creates a rugged terrain in southern Delaware County. Most of the ice-walled channels end at the proximal edge of the Knightstown Moraine. Two major esker systems, one at Anderson and the other at Muncie, are part of this pattern, leading to the Big Blue River Sluiceway.

== Description ==
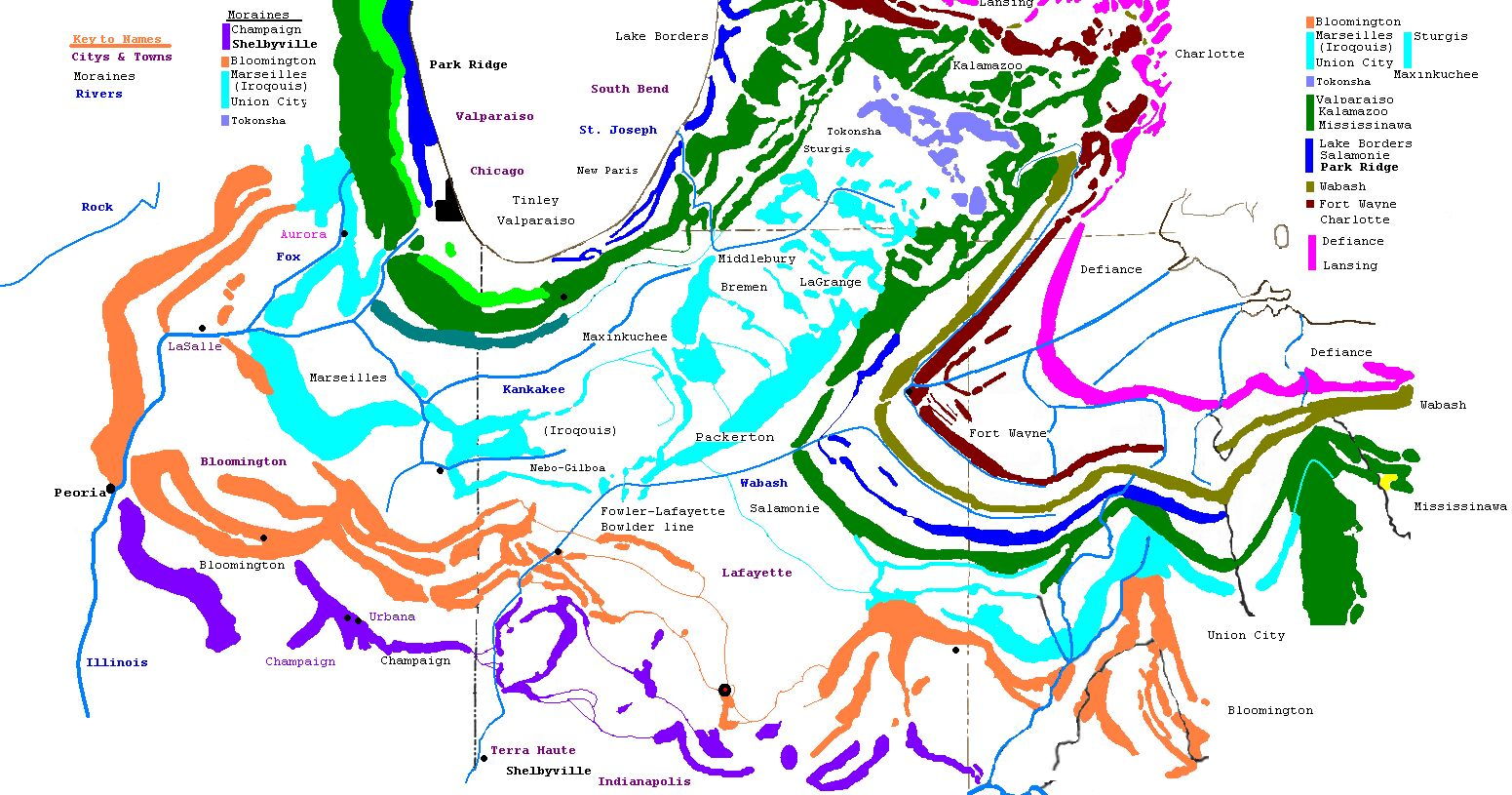
Moraines south of Lake Michigan and southwest of Lake Erie. A composite of three maps (Leverett 1915) (Leverett 1902) (Larsen 1986) and other sources. Colors represent moraines from the same time period of the Wisconsin Glacial epoch

Its clay-rich lithology contrasts greatly with the underlying sandy and silty till. Reexamination of western Wabash County road cuts indicates that the clayey till is present there, but is generally less than 3 feet (0.91 m), thus within the leached portion of the soil profile. The stagnant ice features on the surface of the Trafalgar Formation in east central Indiana take on a different appearance north of the boundary of the Lagro Formation. Patches of low relief disintegration hummocks that characterize the surface of the Trafalgar Formation are drained internally; in contrast similar features that have been recognized on the Lagro are part of an embryonic surface drainage system. The differences in lithology clearly correlate with differences in permeability. In addition to a few long, narrow, shallow, generally till floored channels that cross the till plain between the Union City and Mississinawa Moraines and several large shallow boggy areas, two other groups of geomorphic features ascribable to glacier stagnation are present in that area. These are the Muncie esker system and a pair of ice-walled troughs in southern Grant County.

North of the edge of overlap by the Lagro Formation, ice-disintegration ridges change character because of the changes in till lithology, and long, narrow, shallow ice-walled channels extend across the till plain. These channels are floored with Lagro till, although in many gravel lies below the till, and some segments of the Muncie esker system are capped with the same till. Northwest of Alexandria the edge of the Lagro till is distinct and readily mapped along the low Union City Moraine but from Alexandria to eastern Delaware County the moraine ceases to look like an active ice feature and seems to merge with the dead ice topography of that region. In its advance to the Union City Moraine, the glacier crossed terrain free of ice except for a few scattered blocks northwest of Alexandria, but from Alexandria to eastern Delaware County it probably overrode thin debris-charged stagnant ice. Gravel-filled channels in the dead ice mass were not destroyed by the overriding glacier, but a veneer of clayey till was spread over them as well as over the supporting stagnant ice. A thin and highly mobile ice lobe carrying a small debris load of silt and clay could have spread across thin dead ice heavily loaded with sandy and stony till without causing it to become active again. Such a history would account for the loss of active ice features along the Union City Moraine in Delaware County and the presence of Lagro till on most of the segments of the Muncie esker system.

== See also ==
- Defiance Moraine
- Fort Wayne Moraine
- Wabash Moraine
- Salamonie Moraine
- Mississinawa Moraine
- Union City Moraine
- List of glacial moraines
