= Judi Warren =

American basketball player

Judi Warren is an American former basketball player. After Title IX's passage in 1972, Warren became an important figure in the history of high school women's basketball in Indiana. She was the first Indiana Miss Basketball in 1976.

Warren was born in Claypool, Indiana. She attended Warsaw Community High School, playing for the Warsaw Tigers. She led them to victory in the 1976 state championship.

She graduated from Franklin College and would go on to coach high school basketball. She retired from coaching around 2000 and teaching around 2013. She was inducted into the Indiana Basketball Hall of Fame in 2002.
