= Trafalgar Moraine =

Coordinates: 43.5°N 79.8°W

The Trafalgar Moraine is a geological landform straddling Oakville and Milton in Ontario, Canada. A small portion of the moraine extends into Burlington at Milton's southern border. It is a subtler topological feature than the better-known Oak Ridges Moraine, primarily because it was formed as an end moraine at the terminus of a glacial ice sheet, instead of between two retreating ice lobes (known as interlobate). The ice sheet pushed material to form the ridge, which is composed of Halton Till sediment, rich in silt and clay. By contrast, the Oak Ridges Moraine is primarily sand and gravel. The ridge was probably formed during a pause in the retreat of the ice sheet. The moraine covers an area of 892.5 hectares of primarily private land, though a small portion is public.

== Geology ==
The Trafalgar Moraine is formed primarily of silty, clay-rich sand, and underpinned by shale bedrock, all of which hinder water absorption. Nonetheless, a few areas serve as surface water reservoirs, allowing for some groundwater regeneration, given the almost impermeable soils.

The Trafalgar Moraine is approximately 20 km long, 30 m high and 4 km wide, extending from the Niagara Escarpment north of Nelson to Streetsville in an east-northeast trend; at the Oakville boundary, the trend shifts northeast.

The moraine has impacted the flow of the eastern branch of Sixteen Mile Creek.

This moraine contains the headwaters for six creeks in Oakville. It is home to 496 plant species, 10 fish species, and 220 animal species, of which 168 are birds, 34 are mammals, and 18 are amphibians.

== Watershed ==
The moraine is 27 km long and 4 km wide with a number of small rivers and streams located within the moraine:

- Sixteen Mile Creek
- Fourteen Mile Creek
- McCraney Creek
- Joshua Creek

== Development ==
Development on the moraine has been limited to regions in Mississauga, and the construction of Highway 407.

== See also ==
- Waterloo Moraine
