= Mississinawa Moraine =

Moraine in Ohio, USA

Coordinates: 41°30′N 84°0′W

The Mississinawa Moraine begins in Ohio east of Lima in Hardin County, then running in a shallow arc to the south of Grand Lake St. Marys and St. Marys in Mercer County towards Fort Recovery, Ohio. Just west of Fort Recovery, the moraine again arches southward towards the Mississinewa River. The moraine follows the eastern bank of the river northwestward to where it enters the Wabash River at Wabash, Indiana. Angling towards the north and a little east, the Mississinawa moraine merges with the Packerton Moraine north of the Eel River in Whitley County near Columbia City. The moraine does not end here, but continues in a northeasterly direction through the three corners area of Michigan, Indiana, and Ohio until reaching Ann Arbor, Michigan where numerous moraines intermingle. Note: There are two common spellings of the name. Mississinawa (an A) is commonly used in the older reports. Mississinewa (an E) is the modern usage and the spelling used on modern maps and projects associated with the river. Both spellings are used interchangeably in this article, based on the source material.

== Location ==
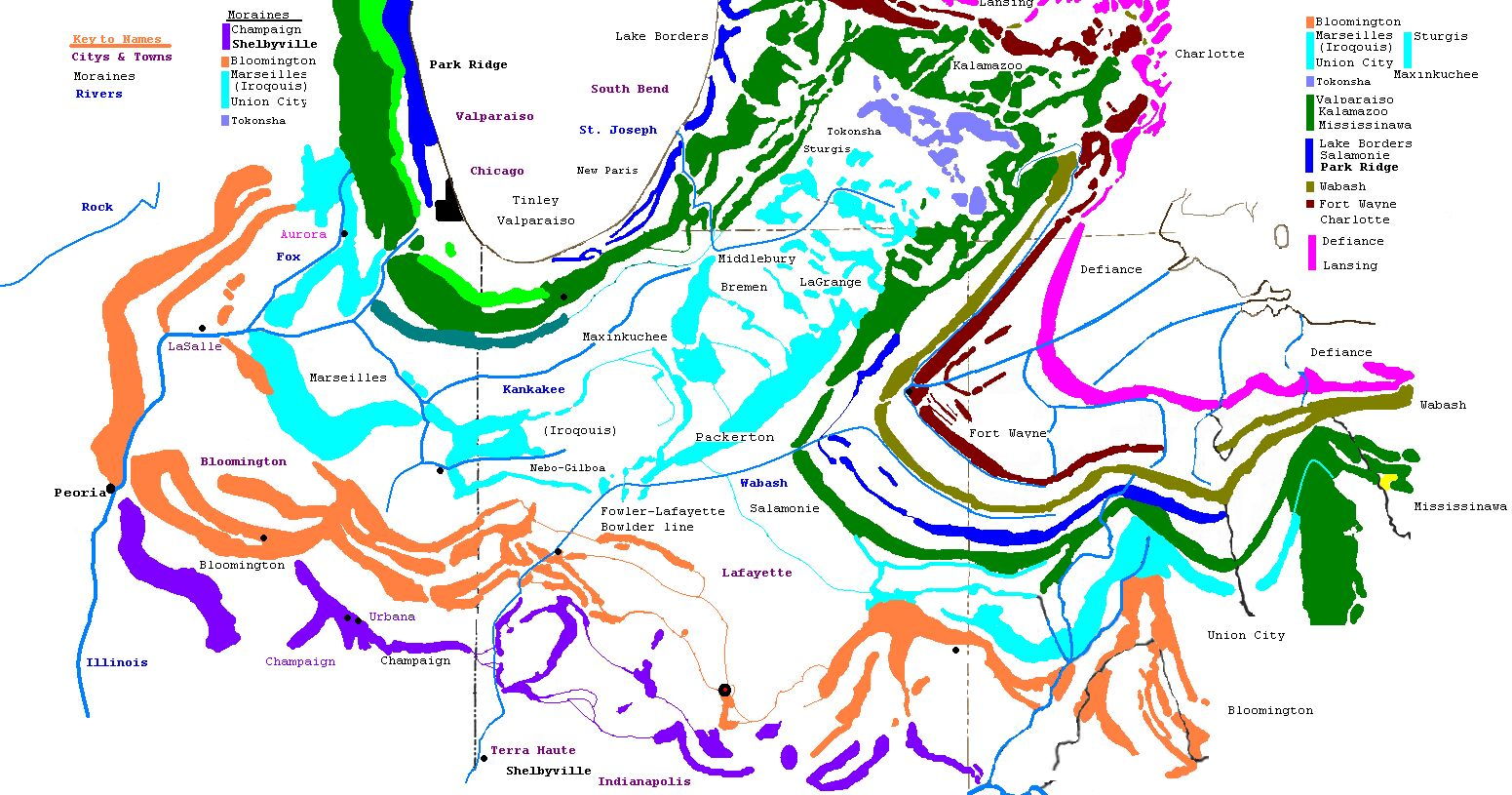
Moraines south of Lake Michigan and southwest of Lake Erie. A composite of three maps (Leverett 1915) (Leverett 1902) (Larsen 1986) and other sources. Colors represent moraines from the same time period of the Wisconsin Glacial epoch

The Mississinewa moraine runs northeast from the Wabash River at Lagro through Wabash, Whitley, eastern Noble and western and northern Steuben counties, into Michigan. Continuing to the northeast, the moraine crosses into Hillsdale County and the northwestern corner of Lenawee County, where it merges with the younger Wabash moraine. The southern arm runs to the southeast from the Wabash along the northern shore of the Mississinewa River from which it takes its name. It crosses the northeast and eastern half of Grant County and its county seat, Marion. Turning eastward across Blackford County, entering Ohio south of Fort Recovery in Mercer County. In a sweeping arc across northern Mercer County, the Mississinewa moraine merges with the St. Johns moraine in Auglaize and Shelby counties. Running parallel, the Mississinewa is renamed as the Broadway and Powel moraines in Hardin County. The St. Johns moraine is the Ohio continuation of the Salamoine moraine in Indiana.

== Description ==
The morainic system south of the Wabash River is from 5 miles (8.0 km) to 6 miles (9.7 km) wide and will separate into two or more ridgelines. It has a steep rises from 20 feet (6.1 m) to 75 feet (23 m) above the surrounding plains. Its drift is largely clay till and has few boulders. The neighboring plains are of stiff clay till with a few knolls.

North from the Wabash River, the moraine is from 3 miles (4.8 km) to 4 miles (6.4 km) wide north of Lagro. Northeast of Columbia City it broadens to 5 miles (8.0 km) to 15 miles (24 km) wide. The elevation rises from 800 feet (240 m) to 1,200 feet (370 m) above sea level when it reaches "Hells’ Point" in Steuben County. The surface is from 8,150 feet (2,480 m) to 300 feet (91 m) above surrounding country.

== Teays River ==
Soil borings used in the investigation Mississinewa moraine and drift located a preglacial valley in Grant and Jay Counties in Indiana. This valley ranged from 300 feet (91 m) to 350 feet (110 m)respectively in each county. Across its length; it is filed with sand and gravel from the Wisconsin glacial period. This valley may relate to the Teays River.

== Correlatives ==
Kalamazoo Morainic System The Kalamazoo morainic system of the Saginaw lobe is a cross link between the Michigan basin and the Huron-Erie basins. Much of its southern area has been altered by a large outwash apron. It is best seen in western Jackson County. The two moraines merge near Spring Arbor, about 10 miles (16 km) west of Jackson at the edge of Washtenaw County.

== See also ==
- Union City Moraine
- Salamonie Moraine
- Wabash Moraine
- Fort Wayne Moraine
- Defiance Moraine
- List of glacial moraines
