= LaTaunya Pollard =

American basketball player (born 1960)

Personal information
- Born: 1960 (age 65–66) East Chicago, Indiana, U.S.
- Listed height: 5 ft 10 in (1.78 m)

Career highlights
- USA Basketball Female Athlete of the Year (1982); Wade Trophy (1983); 2× Kodak All-American (1981, 1983); Indiana Miss Basketball (1979)
- Women's Basketball Hall of Fame

Lataunya Pollard Romanazzi (born 1960) is a former college basketball player who played for Long Beach State from 1979 to 1983. With Long Beach, Pollard scored 3,001 points and was the 1983 recipient of the Wade Trophy. During this time period, Pollard played for the American team that qualified for the 1980 Summer Olympics before the United States withdrew from the event. While on the American team, Pollard won silver at the 1981 World University Games and 1983 FIBA World Championship for Women. Outside of America, Pollard played basketball in Europe from 1983 to the early 1990s. Pollard was inducted into the Women's Basketball Hall of Fame in 2001 and Indiana Basketball Hall of Fame in 2005.

== Early life and education ==
In 1960, Pollard was born in East Chicago, Indiana. Growing up, Pollard tried out for a high school basketball team when she was in grade eight. Upon being chosen for the team, Pollard had to wait a year before she could play as she was under the age requirement. While at East Chicago Roosevelt, Pollard was awarded the 1979 Indiana Miss Basketball. After 93 games, Pollard accumulated 1,739 points. In 1985, Pollard was third for the most points scored by a girls basketball player in Indiana.

== Career ==
In 1979, Pollard started her college basketball career with Long Beach State. During the 1980 AIAW National Division I Basketball Championship, her team reached the quarterfinals. Her team also made it to the quarterfinals in the 1981 AIAW Division I event. As part of the NCAA, Pollard's team won the Western Collegiate Athletic Association conference in 1982. That year, Pollard reached 2,000 career points in women's basketball. At the 1983 NCAA Division I women's basketball tournament, her team reached the regional finals.

During her time at Long Beach, Pollard led the season in points four times and blocks three times. After ending her time with Long Beach in 1983, Pollard had appeared in 128 games and scored 3,001 points. That year, Pollard held the season and career points record as part of the 16 statistics she led with Long Beach. In 2022, Pollard continued to be first in career points record with Long Beach and had remained in first for almost forty years.

Pollard was named most valuable player at the 1979 U.S. Olympic Festival after she scored 82 points in the event. In international events, Pollard scored 72 points at the 1980 FIBA World Olympic Qualifying Tournament as part of the American team that qualified for the 1980 Summer Olympics. Pollard did not compete at the Olympics after the United States decided to not participate in the Games. While on the United States team, Pollard won a silver medal at the 1981 World University Games and 1983 FIBA World Championship for Women. In these events, Pollard scored 106 points at the World University Games and 88 points at the FIBA World Championship. Outside of the United States, Pollard began playing basketball in Italy in 1983 and continued to play there until 1991. While competing in Italy, Pollard consistently led in points each season including a 1985 points record of 39.5.

=== Long Beach State statistics ===
Legend
GP	Games played	GS	Games started	MPG	Minutes per game
FG%	Field goal percentage	3P%	3-point field goal percentage	FT%	Free throw percentage
RPG	Rebounds per game	APG	Assists per game	SPG	Steals per game
BPG	Blocks per game	PPG	Points per game	**Bold**	Career high

Year	Team	GP	Points	PPG	FG%	FT%
1979–80	Long Beach State	**34**	660	19.4	51.8%	74.5%
1980–81	Long Beach State	**34**	733	21.6	54.0%	68.6%
1981–82	Long Beach State	29	701	24.2	**54.1%**	76.0%
1982–83	Long Beach State	31	**907**	**29.3**	52.1%	**77.1%**
Career		128	3001	23.4	52.9%	74.6%

== Awards and honors ==
Pollard was on the All-America Team twice for the Women's Basketball Coaches Association during the early 1980s. In 1982, Pollard was a co-recipient of the USA Basketball Female Athlete of the Year award alongside Cindy Noble. In 1983, Pollard was nominated for the Naismith Trophy. That year, she won the Wade Trophy and was a finalist for the Honda Sports Award for Basketball.

By 1990, Long Beach retired Pollard's jersey. For hall of fame inductions, Pollard was named into the Long Beach State Hall of Fame in 1988 and the Women's Basketball Hall of Fame in 2001. In 2005, she joined the Indiana Basketball Hall of Fame and the National High School Hall of Fame.
