= Pinafore Moraine =

Pinafore Moraine (76°53′S 159°26′E) is a sheet of moraine which extends northeastward from Carapace Nunatak, in Oates Land. Reconnoitered by the New Zealand Antarctic Research Program (NZARP) Allan Hills Expedition (1964). The name is descriptive.
