= Indiana Miss Basketball =

High school sports award

Each year the Indiana Miss Basketball award is given to the person chosen as the best high school girls basketball player in the U.S. state of Indiana.

== Award winners ==
Year	Player	High School	College	WNBA draft
1976	Judi Warren	Warsaw	Franklin (IN)	
1977	Teri Rosinski	Norwell	Illinois State	
1978	Chanda Kline	Warsaw	Indiana State	
1979	LaTaunya Pollard	East Chicago Roosevelt	Long Beach	
1980	Maria Stack	Columbus East	Gonzaga	
1981	Cheryl Cook	Indianapolis Washington	Cincinnati	
1982	Trena Keys	Marion	Notre Dame	
1983	Jody Beerman	Heritage	Central Michigan	
1984	Sharon Versyp	Mishawaka	Purdue	
1985	Jodie Whitaker	Austin	Kentucky	
1986	Kim Barrier	Jimtown	Alabama/ Western Michigan	
1987	Lori Meinerding	Fort Wayne Northrop	Indiana	
1988	Vicki Hall	Indianapolis Brebeuf	Texas	
1989	Renee Westmoreland	Scottsburg	Western Kentucky	
1990	Patricia Babcock	Culver Girls Academy	Northwestern	
1991	Jennifer Jacoby	Rossville	Purdue	
1992	Marla Inman	Bedford North Lawrence	Indiana/Louisville	
1993	Abby Conklin	Charlestown	Tennessee	
1994	Tiffany Gooden	Fort Wayne Snider	Iowa	
1995	Stephanie White	Seeger	Purdue	1999 WNBA draft: 2nd Rnd, 21st overall by the Charlotte Sting
1996	Lisa Winter	Huntington North	Ball State/ Valparaiso	
1997	Lisa Shepherd	Richmond	Penn State	
1998	Kelly Komara	Lake Central	Purdue	2001 WNBA draft: 3rd Rnd, 34th overall by the Indiana Fever
1999	April McDivitt	Connersville	Tennessee/ Santa Barbara	2004 WNBA draft: Free Agent by the Minnesota Lynx
2000	Sara Nord	Jeffersonville	Louisville	2004 WNBA draft: Free Agent by the Washington Mystics
2001	Shyra Ely	Ben Davis	Tennessee	2005 WNBA draft: 2nd Rnd, 14th overall by the San Antonio Silver Stars
2002	Shanna Zolman	Wawasee	Tennessee	2006 WNBA draft: 2nd Rnd, 16th overall by the San Antonio Silver Stars
2003	Katie Gearlds	Beech Grove	Purdue	2007 WNBA draft: 1st Rnd, 7th overall by the Seattle Storm
2004	Jaclyn Leininger	Warsaw	Miami (OH)	
2005	Jodi Howell	Alexandria-Monroe	Purdue	
2006	Amber Harris	Indianapolis North Central	Xavier	2011 WNBA draft: 1st Rnd, 4th overall by the Minnesota Lynx
2007	Ta'Shia Phillips	Indianapolis Brebeuf	Xavier	2011 WNBA draft: 1st Rnd, 8th overall by the Atlanta Dream traded to the Washington Mystics
2008	Brittany Rayburn	Attica	Purdue	
2009	Skylar Diggins	South Bend Washington	Notre Dame	2013 WNBA draft: 1st Rnd, 3rd overall by the Tulsa Shock
2010	Courtney Moses	Oak Hill	Purdue	
2011	Bria Goss	Ben Davis	Kentucky	
2012	Jessica Rupright	Norwell	Miami (OH)	
2013	Stephanie Mavunga	Brownsburg	North Carolina/ Ohio State	
2014	Whitney Jennings	Logansport	Iowa/Butler	
2015	Ali Patberg	Columbus North	Notre Dame/Indiana	2022 WNBA draft: 3rd Rnd, 34th overall by the Indiana Fever
2016	Jackie Young	Princeton	Notre Dame	2019 WNBA draft: 1st Rnd, 1st overall by the Las Vegas Aces
2017	Karissa McLaughlin	Homestead	Purdue	
2018	Amy Dilk	Carmel	Michigan	
2019	Jorie Allen	Bedford North Lawrence	Indiana/DePaul	
2020	Sydney Parrish	Hamilton Southeastern	Oregon/Indiana	
2021	Jayla Smith	Lawrence North	Purdue	
2022	Ayanna Patterson	Homestead	UConn	
2023	Laila Hull	Zionsville	North Carolina	
2024	Chloe Spreen	Bedford North Lawrence	Alabama/Indiana	
2025	Maya Makalusky	Hamilton Southeastern	Indiana	

=== Schools with multiple winners ===
School	Number of Awards	Years
Bedford North Lawrence	3	1992, 2019, 2024
Warsaw	3	1976, 1978, 2004
Indianapolis Brebeuf	2	1988, 2007
Ben Davis	2	2001, 2011
Norwell	2	1977, 2012
Homestead	2	2017, 2022
Hamilton Southeastern	2	2020, 2025

== See also ==
- Indiana Mr. Basketball award
