= Mel Moraine =

Moraine in Queen Maud Land, Antarctica

Mel Moraine (71°53′S 9°18′E) is a moraine at the north end of the Gagarin Mountains, in the Orvin Mountains of Queen Maud Land, Antarctica. It was mapped by Norwegian cartographers from air photos and surveys by the Sixth Norwegian Antarctic Expedition, 1956–60, and named Mel (meal).
