= Tvireita Moraine =

Moraine in Queen Maud Land, Antarctica

Tvireita Moraine (71°55′S 14°37′E) is a moraine, about 5 nautical miles (9 km) long, comprising two somewhat parallel segments that appear to unite as they trend northeast, located in the east part of Mendeleyev Glacier in the Payer Mountains, Queen Maud Land. Plotted from air photos and surveys by Norwegian Antarctic Expedition, 1956–60, and named Tvireita (two furrows).
