= Packerton Moraine =

Moraine in Indiana

Coordinates: 41°15′N 84°45′W

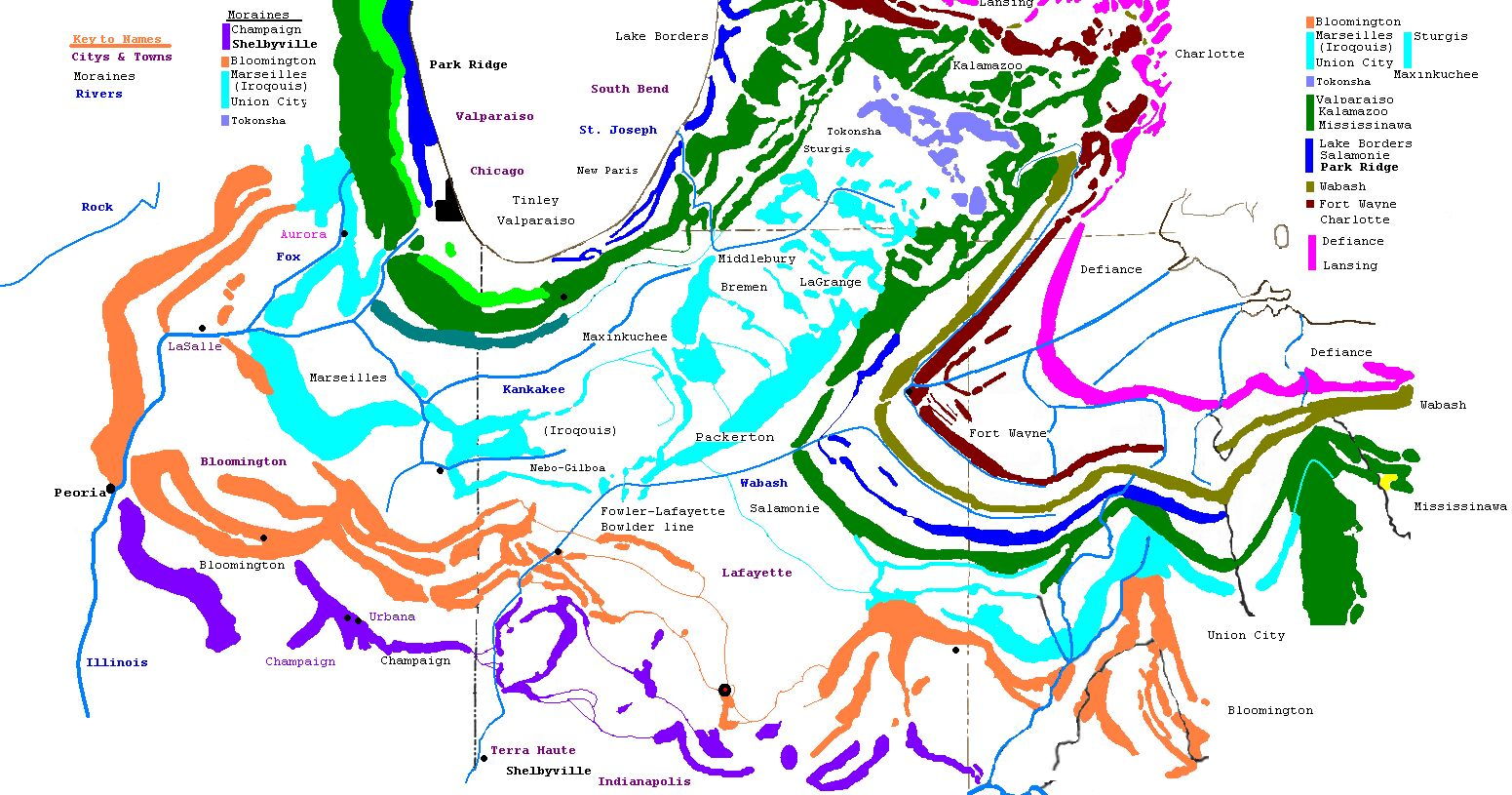
Moraines south of Lake Michigan and southwest of Lake Erie. A composite of three maps (Leverett 1915) (Leverett 1902) (Larsen 1986) and other sources. Colors represent moraines from the same time period of the Wisconsin Glacial epoch.

The Packerton Moraine in north-central Indiana has been considered by most persons who have studied it to be a large interlobate moraine between the Saginaw and the Erie lobes. The northeast–southwest direction of the eskers north of Disko, Wabash County, and the southeast–northwest trend south of there indicated that the part of the Packerton moraine south of Disko was built by the Erie lobe and the part north of Disko by the Saginaw lobe. An esker, Miami County shows a northeast–southwest alignment, providing evidence that Packerton moraine in Miami County was built by the Erie lobe. A small area in the northwestern was deposited by the Saginaw lobe. It is named the Packerton moraine from the village of Packerton in Kosciusko County. Thirteen kames and eskers complexes are mixed with sand and gravel. The till is, sandier, especially in the part deposited by the Saginaw lobe, than in the lobe passed over some source of sand, whereas the Erie lobe did not. Water-laid or wind-blown sands are found throughout the moraine. The bulk of the sand seems to have been water-deposited, but locally the sand appears to have been reworked by the wind. Few of the sand deposits exhibit dunal forms.

== Description ==
At its western end, near Delphi in Carroll County, the Packerton moraine is 2 to 3 metres (0.0020 to 0.0030 km) wide. It is on the north side of the Wabash River as far as Logansport, continuing along the north side of the Eel River. In Miami and Wabash Counties the moraine is wider and further from the Eel River, separated by a belt of outwash 1 to 3 miles (1.6 to 4.8 km) wide. Its hummocky topography shows numerous kames, eskers and lakes. The maximum altitude exceeds 830 feet (250 m), and local relief exceeds 100 feet (30 m). Only along the Wabash sluiceway is the relief greater. Till and water-laid sands and gravels occur together in rather complex relationships, and a few short eskers are associated with it in the northern part of the county. The largest, in reaches 40 feet (12 m) and forms a discontinuous eastwest ridge for about 2 miles.

== History ==
During the Tazewell subage, the Wabash, Eel, and Mississinewa Rivers and their major tributaries served as sluiceways for the Saginaw or Erie lobes. Outwash that was deposited along the major valleys has not been distinguished from that laid down later during the Cary substage. Tazewell outwash is exposed, however, along such minor sluiceways as Mill, Big and Little Pipe, and Deer Creeks and three southward-flowing tributaries of the Eel River, none of which served as sluiceways during the Cary substage. The Packerton Moraine in which Shoe Lake is located belongs to the moraines of the Saginaw lobe of late Wisconsin Substage. It has its origin in northern Carroll County, extends northeastward through Cass, Miami, Fulton, Kosciusko, and Whitley Counties, and terminates about the middle of Noble County. Here it joins with the Morainic system of the Erie Lobe. Shoe Lake is two miles southeast of Oswego. Indiana, and one mile south of the eastern end of Tippecanoe Lake.

== See also ==
- Mississinawa Moraine
- Valparaiso Moraine
