= Furdesanden Moraine =

Moraine in Antarctica

Furdesanden Moraine (71°48′S 9°37′E) is a moraine extending in a north–south direction for 17 nautical miles (31 km) along the west side of the Conrad Mountains in the Orvin Mountains of Queen Maud Land, Antarctica. It was discovered and photographed by the Third German Antarctic Expedition, 1938–39. It was mapped by Norway from air photos and surveys by the Sixth Norwegian Antarctic Expedition, 1956–60, and named Furdesanden (the furrow of sand).
