= Packerton, Indiana =

- Unincorporated community
- Location within Indiana Location within the United States
- Coordinates: 41°06′59″N 85°47′51″W
- Country: United States
- State: Indiana
- County: Kosciusko
- Township: Clay
- Elevation: 919 ft (280 m)
- Time zone: UTC-5 (Eastern (EST))
  - Summer (DST): UTC-4 (EDT)
- ZIP code: 46510
- GNIS feature ID: 440823

Packerton is an unincorporated community in Clay Township, Kosciusko County, in the U.S. state of Indiana.

== History ==
Packerton was laid out as a town in 1882 by John C. Packer, when the railroad was extended to that point. A post office was established at Packerton in 1881, and remained in operation until it was discontinued in 1926.

The community is the namesake of the Packerton Moraine.

Indiana State FFA Vice President Lindsey O'Hara served the Indiana FFA Association in 2014–2015.
