= The Strand Moraines =

Glacial landform in Victoria Land

Coordinates: 77°45′S 164°31′E

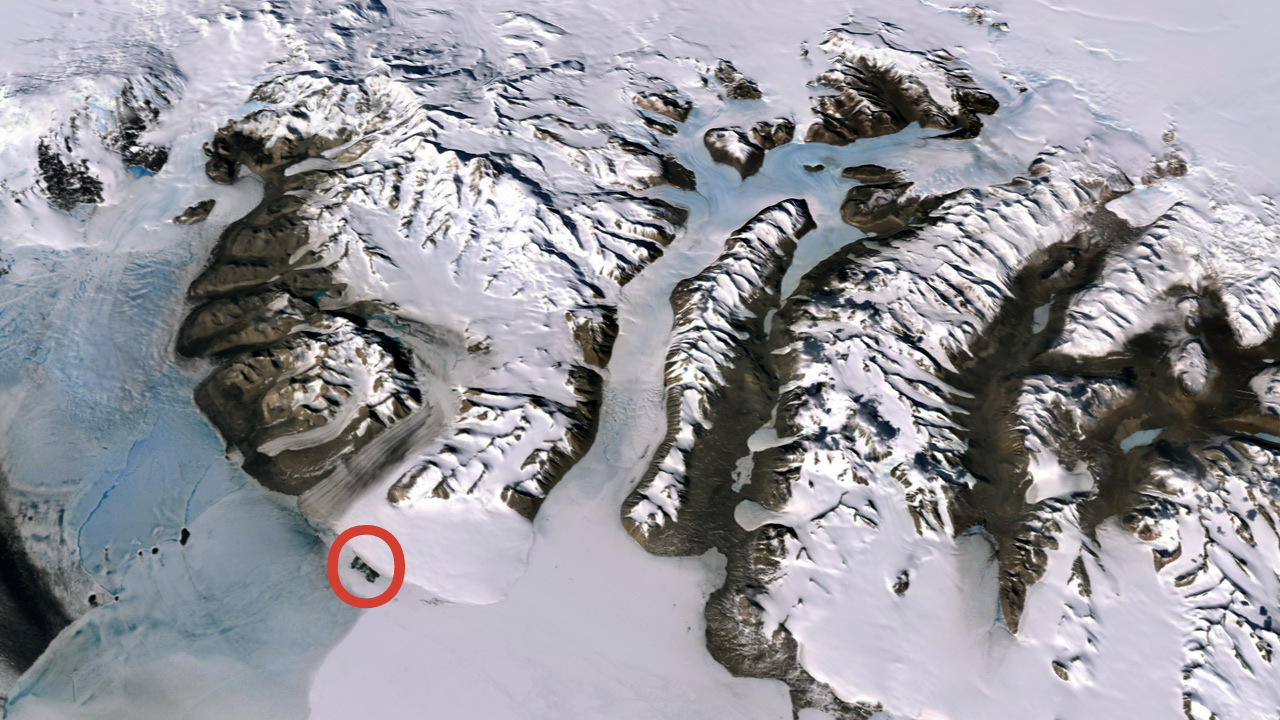
The Straing Moraines circled in red

The Strand Moraines is an ancient lateral moraine of the Koettlitz Glacier, deposited at the outer edge of Bowers Piedmont Glacier on the west shore of McMurdo Sound, in Victoria Land. The morraine is 20,000 to 5,000 years old and has an ice core formed by both glacier ice and saltwater ice.

Discovered by the Discovery expedition (1901–04) and first called "The Eskers." The feature was renamed by Scott in keeping with its true nature.
