= Waterloo Moraine =

Landform and sediment body

Coordinates: 43.432°N 80.574°W

The Waterloo Moraine is a landform and sediment body that was created as a moraine in the Regional Municipality of Waterloo, in Ontario, Canada. It covers a large portion of the cities of Waterloo and Kitchener and the township of Wilmot, and some parts of the townships of Wellesley and North Dumfries. About 90% of the water supply of the Regional Municipality of Waterloo is derived from groundwater of the Waterloo Moraine aquifer system.

During late 1989 and early 1990, groundwater contamination in Elmira forced the Region to shut down some well fields. As a result, new land use management guidelines and water protection measures have been enacted.

The Waterloo Moraine is the largest of fourteen moraines in the Region, spanning approximately 400 square kilometres. It is an interlobate moraine, consisting primarily of sand and gravel. It contains large aquifers, which discharge into the Grand River and its tributaries and maintain a base water flow rate into that system.

== Origin ==
The Waterloo Moraine was formed as the three ice lobes of the Laurentide Ice Sheet retreated across what is now Waterloo Region from Lake Huron in the west, Georgian Bay in the northeast, Lake Ontario in the east and Lake Erie in the southeast. As the glacier moved, it carried with it huge boulders, sand, gravel and debris. As the ice disappeared, the Waterloo Moraine remained, a huge complex of glacial sediments that is between 30 metres and more than 100 metres thick. Meltwater streams cascading from the surface of the ice lobes carried enormous deposits of sand and gravel and blocks of bedrock.

The glacial sediments constituting the moraine rest upon the Guelph and Salina carbonate bedrock formations.

== Significance ==
The Waterloo Moraine provides drinking water for over 300,000 people throughout Waterloo Region, and approximately 75% of its potable water. The Waterloo Moraine is currently not protected by provincial legislation although there is an active movement from citizens to see that this takes place.

Louisette Lanteigne and David Wellhauser of Waterloo have used the Environmental Bill of Rights to submit a Request for Review for a Waterloo Moraine Protection Act. This resulted in a 16-month review of source water and groundwater protection for the Waterloo Moraine. The findings were to be published in September 2008.

== Function ==
In the vicinity where the three ice lobes began to retreat, sits the recharge areas that allow surface water to enter back into the ground source. The speed of absorption depends on the density of aquifers and aquitards. Aquifers are made up of sand, gravel and silt where the water filters down relatively quickly. The shallow aquifers feed area bodies of water such as creeks and streams while the deeper aquifers feed down to replenish the ground water. The aquitards are the protective layers of clay that slowly filters the water and act to protect the main source from contamination. Left on its own, it is a naturally renewable way to gather fresh drinking water.

=== Ground water recharge ===
The moraine covers much of the City of Waterloo, Kitchener, Wellesley, Wilmot and North Dumfries, covering 400 square kilometres (150 sq mi) of land. Almost half of the ground water recharge takes place on only 15% of the Grand River watershed and 80% occurs on only 30% of the land mass most of which is located at the west end of Waterloo Region in the townships of Wilmot and Wellesley.

== Threats ==
The ground water travels down from west to east feeding area wells throughout the region. Subdivision developments in the west end would create more impervious surfaces in the vicinity of the recharge area. Instead of allowing the water to refill the source, the run off will be diverted to sewage systems instead. This will mean a permanent decrease in the volume of water entering area wells. The reduction of water in the wells will significantly increase the parts per billion of contaminants in the system jeopardizing the quality of water in the aquifer and increasing the costs of filtration.

If an increase in traffic follows the development in the vicinity of the aquifer, there will be an increased risk of contamination by road salt which is, according to Environment Canada, a known toxic substance. Road salt is a form of chloride that kills fish and pollutes area creeks and streams.
