= Defiance Moraine =

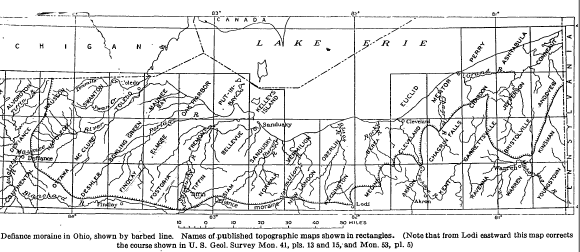

The Defiance Moraine was deposited about 14,800 years ago during the late Wisconsin glaciation and spans the northern portion of the state of Ohio from Defiance, Ohio in the west to near Pymatuning Reservoir in the east.

Near Defiance, Ohio inundation by Lake Maumee significantly reduced the relief of the moraine.

The moraine is a noteworthy landform in several counties across the state in addition to Defiance County, including Putnam, Hancock, Seneca, Lorain, Medina, Cuyahoga, Geauga, Trumbull and Ashtabula.

The moraine passes just south of the village of Alvada, Ohio in Seneca, County. The crest of the moraine is 850 to 860 feet above sea level and varies from two to five miles in width with an asymmetrical form, rising abruptly from the till plain on the south and descending gradually to the north so the boundary is indistinct.

The Defiance Moraine is the source of the Black River between New London and Lodi.

The moraine nearly encircles Geauga County on the west, north, and east flanks in a belt that is 1 to 2 miles wide with 10 to 30 feet of relief.
