= Northwest Indiana =

Sub-region of Indiana, US

Coordinates: 41°10′N 87°0′W

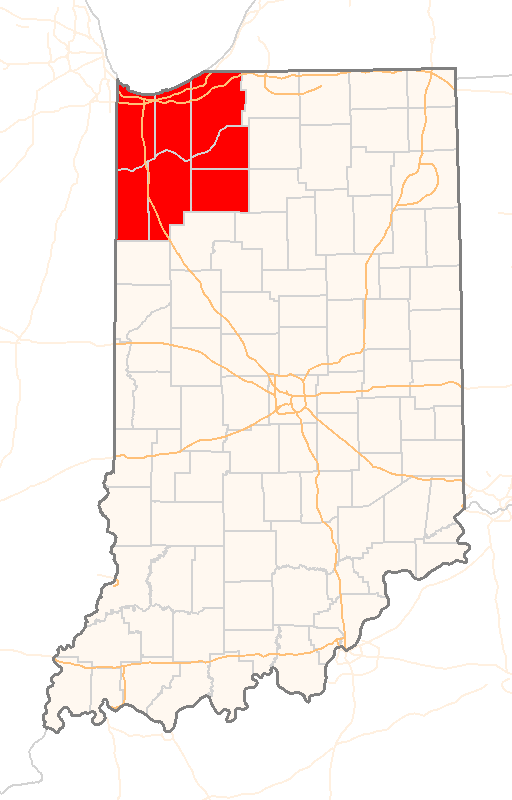
Map of Northwest Indiana

Northwest Indiana, commonly referred to as "The Region" after the Calumet Region, is an unofficial geographic area in the northwestern corner of Indiana in the United States. Although its boundaries are not formally defined, the area is generally associated with the Gary, Indiana Metropolitan Division, which includes Jasper, Lake, Porter and Newton counties, and the Michigan City–La Porte Metropolitan Statistical Area, which includes LaPorte County, with some broader definitions also including Starke and Pulaski counties.

The area borders Lake Michigan and portions of it are considered part of the Chicago metropolitan area. Based on the 2020 United States census, the broadest definition of Northwest Indiana has a population of 866,965, making it the second-largest urban area in the state after the Indianapolis metropolitan area.

Northwest Indiana contains the Indiana Dunes National Park and the Indiana Dunes State Park. The region's largest city is Hammond, followed by Gary. Other municipalities in Northwest Indiana include Aix, Burns Harbor, Chesterton, Crown Point, DeMotte, Dyer, East Chicago, Griffith, Highland, Hebron, Hobart, Kentland, Lake Station, La Porte, Lowell, Merrillville, Michigan City, Munster, Portage, Rensselaer, Schererville, St. John, Cedar Lake, Valparaiso, Whiting, and Winfield.

== Overview ==
Jasper, Lake, LaPorte, Newton and Porter counties are included in the Chicago–Naperville–Michigan City Combined Statistical Area, the broadest census-defined designation for the Chicago metropolitan area. Unlike most of Indiana, which is in the Eastern Time Zone, these counties and Starke County are in the Central Time Zone; Pulaski County is the only county in the broader definitions of Northwest Indiana that is in the Eastern Time Zone. The time zone alignment reflects the area's economic connections with the Chicago metropolitan area.

Lake, Porter, and LaPorte counties are served by the Northwestern Indiana Regional Planning Commission, the metropolitan planning organization for the area.

Northwest Indiana is the home of Marktown, a planned worker community in East Chicago designed by Clayton Mark.

== Geography ==
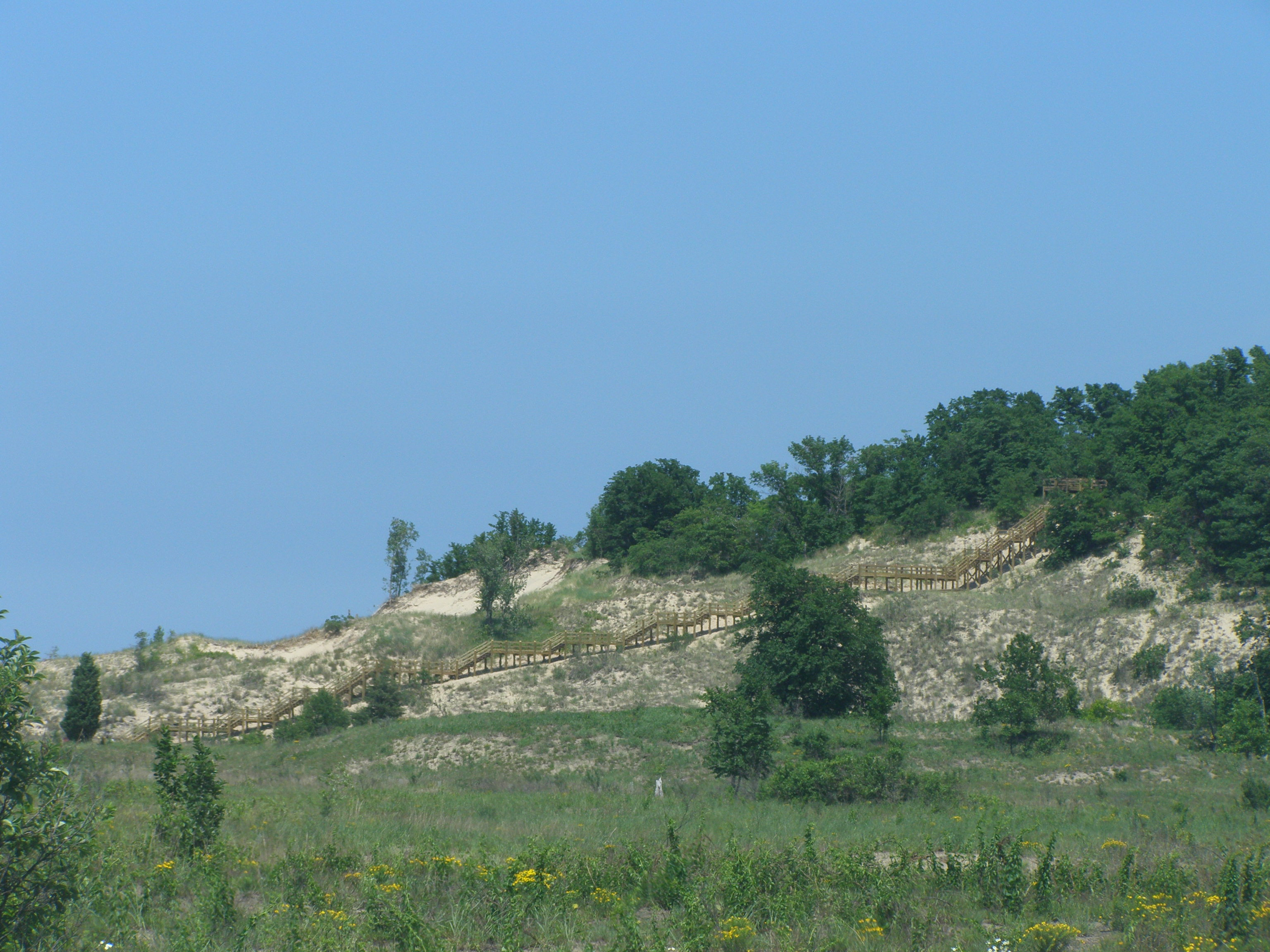
The Long Stairs up the dune at West Beach on the Succession Trail

The Lake Michigan shoreline is a major geographical feature of the region. Indiana Dunes National Park, which extends from Gary to Michigan City, contains areas of sand dunes, beaches, grasslands, forests, and several historic structures.

The landscape of Northwest Indiana ranges from steep dunes to rolling morainal hills and flat river valleys, reflecting the influence of glacial activity and Lake Michigan on the area's topography. Notable landforms in the region include the Valparaiso Moraine, Tinley Moraine, Lake Border Moraine, Iroquois Moraine, Calumet Shoreline, Glenwood Shoreline, Tolleston Shoreline, and the Kankakee Outwash Plain.

=== Chicago Lake Plain ===
The Chicago Lake Plain encompasses the relatively flat northern portion of Northwest Indiana located north of the morainal system. The plain consists of glaciolacustrine deposits that formed under the waters of glacial Lake Michigan. This lake developed as glaciers melted north of the Valparaiso Moraine. Overflow through a low point on the moraine at the Chicago Outlet in the present-day southwestern Chicago suburbs lowered the lake to approximately its modern level (Horsley, 1986). As the lake receded, it left a series of sand ridges marking former shorelines. Along the Lake Michigan coast, prevailing winds formed additional dune ridges, creating variation within the originally flat surface of the lake plain.

=== Wheaton Morainal Plain ===
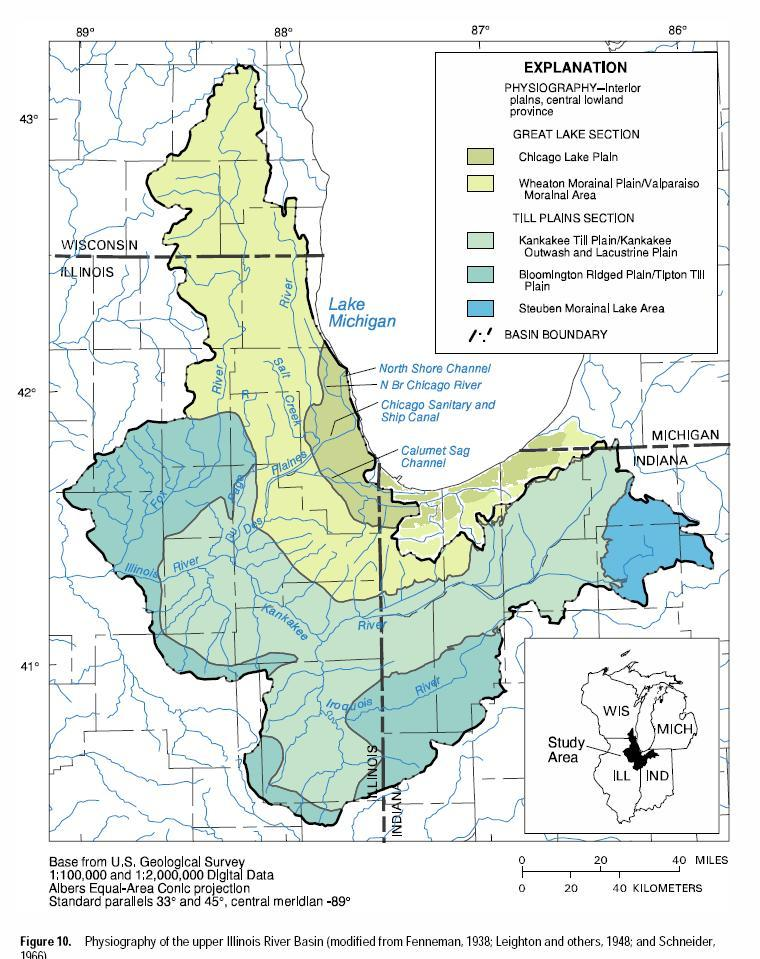
Physiography of the Upper Illinois River Basin

South of the Chicago Lake Plain, covering central parts of Lake and Porter counties and northern LaPorte County, lies the hilly Wheaton Morainal Plain. This plain includes the Valparaiso Moraine and Tinley Moraine, which run roughly parallel to the Lake Michigan shoreline. The Wheaton Morainal Plain is composed of rolling moraines from the Wisconsin glaciation and consists of clayey till, sandy and loamy till, with localized deposits of sand and gravel. Additional sediments include lake clay, silt, and alluvium. Thicknesses of these deposits range between 50 and 200 ft (15 and 61 m), with some southern areas exceeding 200 ft of till (Mades, 1987).

=== Kankakee Outwash Plain ===
The Kankakee Outwash Plain, located in southern Lake, Porter, and LaPorte counties, is a flat outwash plain formed by meltwater from glaciers halted at the Valparaiso Moraine (Mickelson et al., 1984). The deposits are primarily sand and gravel, with additional layers of alluvium and fill material. Deposit thickness generally averages less than 200 ft (61 m), ranging from under 50 ft (15 m) in lowland areas to more than 200 ft in upland areas. Local elevation variations are typically less than 100 ft (30 m), and the plain includes numerous scattered sand dunes.

=== Bloomington Ridged Plain ===
The Bloomington Ridged Plain occupies the southernmost portion of Northwest Indiana, in the Iroquois River valley of southern Newton and Jasper counties. The area is characterized by low, rolling hills, including moraines such as the Iroquois Moraine, with elevation changes of less than 300 ft (91 m). Soils in the region consist of loamy till, lake clay, and silt. These deposits were left by the northeastward retreat of the Huron-Erie glacial lobe, in contrast to the northern half of Northwest Indiana. Thickness of the deposits is generally less than 200 ft (61 m), though some areas exceed 400 ft (120 m).

== Economy ==
In 2015, Northwest Indiana had a gross domestic product of $28.64 billion, representing approximately nine percent of Indiana's total gross state product. This placed the region second among Indiana metropolitan areas, after Indianapolis, and 89th in the United States, comparable to the GDP of the El Paso, Texas, metropolitan area.

The northern portion of Northwest Indiana is a center for heavy industry. Major steel mills are located in Gary, Portage, Burns Harbor, and East Chicago, including the largest North American facilities of U.S. Steel (Gary Works) and Cleveland-Cliffs (Indiana Harbor). Whiting, East Chicago, and Hammond are the location of the largest oil refinery in the world operated by BP. Other industrial outputs in the region include fabricated metals, transportation equipment, and food products.

Since the 1990s, casino gambling has become a notable part of the regional economy. In 2021, a land-based casino with approximately 150,000 square feet (14,000 m^{2}) of gaming space opened in Gary, replacing two boats. Two casino boats with a combined gaming space of approximately 164,000 square feet (15,200 m^{2}) operate along Lake Michigan in Lake County, and an additional facility in Michigan City provides 65,000 square feet (6,000 m^{2}) of gaming space.

In 2006, the Northwest Indiana Regional Development Authority (RDA) was established by the Indiana State Legislature and then-Governor Mitch Daniels. The RDA is a special-purpose district authorized to invest in transportation and economic development throughout the region.

Several suburban communities in Northwest Indiana function as commuter towns for individuals who work in Chicago.

== Higher education ==
Colleges and universities located in Northwest Indiana include:

- Calumet College of St. Joseph in Whiting
- Indiana University Northwest (IU Northwest) in Gary
- Purdue University Northwest, which combines the former Purdue University Calumet campus in Hammond and Purdue University North Central campus in Westville
- Saint Joseph's College in Rensselaer
- Valparaiso University in Valparaiso
- Hyles-Anderson College in Crown Point.
- Ivy Tech Community College

== Counties ==
- Jasper County
- Lake County
- LaPorte County
- Newton County
- Porter County
- Pulaski County
- Starke County

=== Census Bureau population statistics ===
Census Area	2020 census	2010 census	2000 census	1990 census	1980 census	1970 census	1960 census	1950 census
Jasper County, Indiana	32,918	33,478	30,043	24,960	26,138	20,429	18,842	17,031
Lake County, Indiana	498,700	496,005	484,564	475,594	522,965	546,253	513,269	368,152
LaPorte County, Indiana	112,417	111,467	110,106	107,066	108,632	105,342	95,111	76,808
Newton County, Indiana	13,830	14,244	14,566	13,551	14,844	11,606	11,502	11,006
Porter County, Indiana	173,215	164,343	146,798	128,932	119,816	87,114	60,279	40,076
Pulaski County, Indiana	12,514	13,402	13,755	12,643	13,258	12,534	12,837	12,493
Starke County, Indiana	23,371	23,363	23,556	22,747	21,997	19,280	17,911	15,282
Total	866,965	856,302	823,388	785,493	827,650	802,558	729,751	540,848

== Transportation ==
=== Airports ===
- Gary/Chicago International Airport (GYY) - No current scheduled air service

=== Commuter rail ===
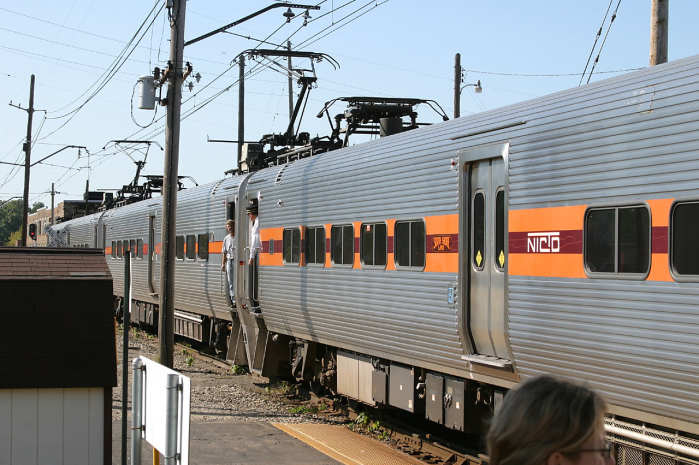
South Shore Train at Dune Park Station

- South Shore Line connecting Chicago to South Bend, Indiana, passing through Gary and Michigan City

=== Highways ===
- Interstate 65
- Interstate 80
- Interstate 90 (Indiana Toll Road)
- Interstate 94
- U.S. Route 6
- U.S. Route 12
- U.S. Route 20
- U.S. Route 24
- U.S. Route 30
- U.S. Route 35
- U.S. Route 41
- U.S. Route 231
- U.S. Route 421
- Indiana State Road 2
- Indiana State Road 4
- Indiana State Road 8
- Indiana State Road 10
- Indiana State Road 14
- Indiana State Road 16
- Indiana State Road 39
- Indiana State Road 49
- Indiana State Road 51
- Indiana State Road 53
- Indiana State Road 55
- Indiana State Road 71
- Indiana State Road 104
- Indiana State Road 114
- Indiana State Road 130
- Indiana State Road 149
- Indiana State Road 152
- Indiana State Road 212
- Indiana State Road 249
- Indiana State Road 312
- Indiana State Road 520
- Indiana State Road 912

== Area codes ==
- 219
- 574

== Local media ==
=== Print ===
- The Times of Northwest Indiana - Print, Online
- Post-Tribune - Print, Online
- Region Sports Network - Print, Online, Broadcast
- Chesterton Tribune - Print, Online
- La Porte Herald-Argus - Print, Online
- The News-Dispatch - Print, Online

=== Broadcast ===
- WJOB (AM) 1230 - Radio
- WLTH (AM) 1370 - Radio
- WWCA (AM) - Radio
- WAKE 1500 - Radio
- WIMS (AM) 1420 - Radio
- WGVE-FM 88.7 - Radio
- WLPR-FM 89.1 - Radio
- WEFM (FM) 95.9 - Radio
- WXRD (FM) 103.9 - Radio
- WLJE (FM) 105.5 - Radio
- WZVN 107.1 - Radio
- Regional Radio Sports Network - Radio
- WYIN-TV - 56/17 Television
- WJYS-TV - 62/36 Television

== Notable people ==
- Omar Apollo
- Anne Baxter
- Larry Bigbie
- Stephan Bonnar
- Max Booth III
- Frank Borman
- Junior Bridgeman
- Bob Chapek
- Dick Cathcart
- Jack Chevigny
- Dan Dakich
- Bryce Drew
- Homer Drew
- James Edwards
- Jim Gaffigan
- Winston Garland
- Freddie Gibbs
- LaTroy Hawkins
- Sue Hendrickson
- Jack Hyles
- Jackson family
  - Janet Jackson
  - Jermaine Jackson
  - La Toya Jackson
  - Marlon Jackson
  - Michael Jackson
  - Randy Jackson
  - Tito Jackson
- Michael Joiner
- Alex Karras
- Ron Kittle
- Bob Kuechenberg
- Rudy Kuechenberg
- Art LaFleur
- Barney Liddell
- Kenny Lofton
- Lloyd McClendon
- Karen McDougal
- Karl Malden
- Dale Messick
- E'Twaun Moore
- Hal Morris
- Betsy Palmer
- Mary Lou Piatek
- Dan Plesac
- Gregg Popovich
- Gary Primich
- Orville Redenbacher
- Frank Reynolds
- John Roberts
- Glenn Robinson
- Glenn Robinson III
- Jerry L. Ross
- Scott Sheldon
- Kawann Short
- Bobby Skafish
- Tim Stoddard
- Hank Stram
- Dean White
- Eugene Wilson
- Jeff Samardzija
- Jean Shepherd
- Jo Anne Worley
- Tony Zale

== Parks and nature areas ==
- Biesecker Nature Preserve, St. John, Lake County
- Calumet Prairie Nature Preserve, Gary, Lake County
- Conrad Savanna Nature Preserve, Conrad, Newton County (black and white oak savanna)
- Fish Lake Wildlife Conservation Area, Fish Lake, LaPorte County
- Gibson Woods Nature Preserve, Hammond, Lake County
- Indiana Dunes National Park, Porter County
  - Cowles Bog
  - Pinhook Bog, LaPorte County
  - Hoosier Prairie Nature Preserve, Griffith, Lake County
- Indiana Dunes State Park, Porter County
  - Dunes Nature Preserve
- Ivanhoe Nature Preserve, Gary, Indiana
- Jasper-Pulaski Fish and Wildlife Area, Radioville, Pulaski County
- Kingsbury Fish and Wildlife Area, Kingbury, LaPorte County
- LaSalle Fish and Wildlife Area
- Stoutsburg Savanna Nature Preserve, Wheatfield, Jasper County (rolling sand ridges)
- Willow Slough Fish and Wildlife Area, Morocco, Newton County
