= WAIB =

WAIB may refer to:

- WAIB-LP, a low-power radio station (88.5 FM) licensed to serve Redwood, New York, United States
- WWOF, a radio station (103.1 FM) licensed to serve Tallahassee, Florida, United States, which held the call sign WAIB from 1995 to 2010
- WXTY, a radio station (99.9 FM) licensed to serve Lafayette, Florida, which held the call sign WAIB from 1994 to 1995
