= Moraine Valley Community College =

Community college in Palos Hills, Illinois, U.S.

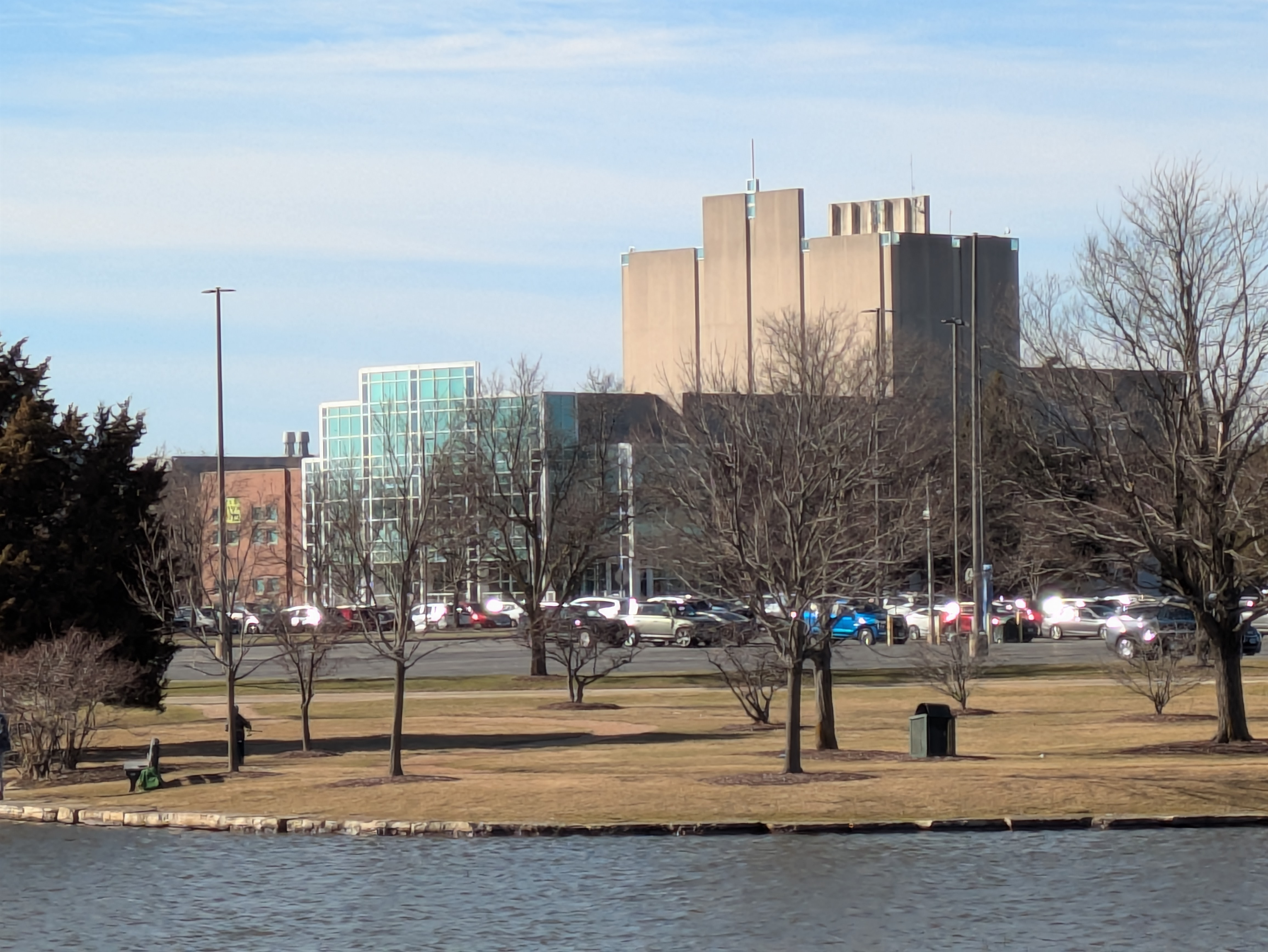
- Fine and Performing Arts Center
- Type: Public community college
- Established: 1967; 59 years ago
- President: Pamela Haney
- Academic staff: 182 Full-time and 438 Part-time (Spring 2022)
- Students: 10,578 (Spring 2022)
- Location: Palos Hills, Illinois, U.S. 41°41′35″N 87°50′16″W
- Campus: Suburban
- Colors: Green and white
- Mascot: Cyclones
- Website: www.morainevalley.edu
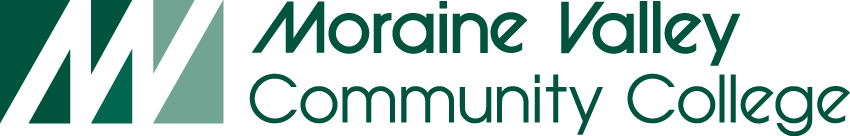

Moraine Valley Community College is a public community college in Palos Hills, Illinois. The college operates satellite centers in Blue Island and Tinley Park, Illinois. Established in 1967, it is adjacent to the Palos Forest Preserves.

The college is funded by Moraine Valley Community College District 524 which covers a population of around 390,000 people across 26 municipalities, including Orland Park, Oak Lawn, and Tinley Park.

== History ==
In 1967, the college was officially created after two years of effort led by the Oak Lawn Rotary Club that included proposals, approval and planning. It opened its first temporary office in Oak Lawn, Illinois. A year later, a contest was held to give the college its name, Moraine Valley Community College. The name was chosen for the location of its campus, where Tinley Moraine and Valparaiso Moraine meet to form a valley. Since the campus was not yet established, the first classes began Sept. 16, 1968 in leased warehouses in Alsip, IL.

A year later in 1969, seven temporary buildings opened on the Palos Hills campus, 9000 W. College Parkway. In 1970, with enrollment at 4,089, construction began on the first permanent building on the campus, which opened two years later in 1972. From that point on, buildings have been continually added to the campus until as recently as 2014. The last temporary building was torn down in 1994. The first extension site, the Education Center at Blue Island, opened in 2004. On Oct. 6, 2010, the second extension site, the Southwest Education Center, opened in Tinley Park, IL. The U.S. Green Building Council awarded that facility LEED Platinum certification for its high level of "green" performance.

=== Presidents ===
- Robert E. Turner: 1968–1975
- James D. Koeller: 1975–1982
- Fred Gaskin: 1982–1991
- Vernon O. Crawley: 1991–2012
- Sylvia Jenkins: 2012–2023
- Pamela J Haney: 2023–Present

== International students ==
Moraine Valley has grown its international student interest over the years. In the late 1970s, the college had about 40 international students. By 1984, no international students were enrolled in the college. In 1989, the college started a program to appeal to students of other countries and to aid them in their academic endeavors, and as a result, the international student population has grown to over 200 in the present day.

Many accommodations are now made for international students at Moraine Valley, including:

- Intensive English Program
- Airport Arrival Service
- Housing Assistance through the Host Home Program
- Cross Cultural Counseling
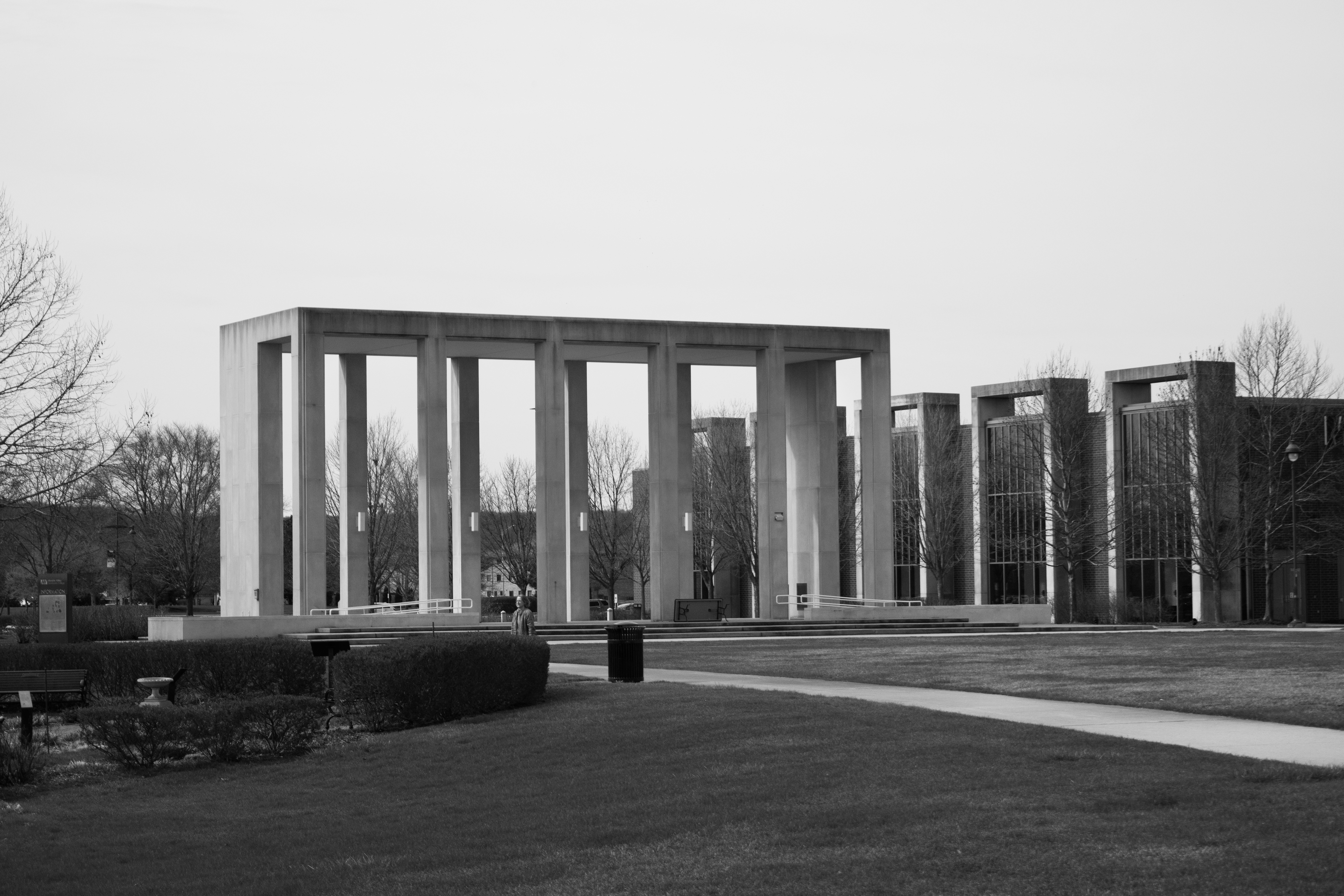
- The Moraine Valley Main Campus Archway.
  International Student Ambassadors

== Campus activities ==
=== Athletics ===
As a member of the NJCAA, the Moraine Valley Cyclones participate in 12 intercollegiate sports, including men's baseball, cross-country, basketball, golf and soccer, and women's basketball, cross-country, golf, soccer, softball and volleyball. Moraine Valley is a member of the Illinois Skyway Collegiate Conference, which consists of seven other junior colleges in the surrounding area. The athletics program is housed in the Health, Fitness & Recreation Center (Building H) on campus and is quite successful with many teams advancing to national competitions.

In 1998, the mascot for the college was changed from the Marauders to the Cyclones.

=== Student life ===
Moraine Valley offers its students many opportunities to get involved on campus. There are about 40 clubs and organizations in which students can participate. The focus of these groups include, but are not limited to, special academic interests, religion, diversity and awareness, service and student government. Additionally, Moraine Valley provides various facilities for its students to spend their free time, such as the library, Fine and Performing Arts Center, Student Union, the Health, Fitness & Recreation Center, a 1.45-mile jogging path, and the Jack G. Bradley observation deck. Moraine Valley has 5 dining locations located on campus: Cafe Moraine, Elixir, The White Sheep Cafe, Donut Dudes, and al-hamawi.

== See also ==
- Ben Skora
