= KGRT =

KGRT may refer to:

- KGRT-FM, a radio station (103.9 FM) licensed to serve Las Cruces, New Mexico, United States
- KWML, a radio station (570 AM) licensed to serve Las Cruces, New Mexico, which held the call sign KGRT until 2014
