= Toleston Shoreline =

The Toleston Shoreline is the third ancient shoreline of the precursor to Lake Michigan, Lake Chicago. It takes its name from the village of Tolleston, now a portion of Gary, Indiana. The shoreline formed when Lake Chicago was high enough to drain through the Chicago outlet into the Des Plaines River. The beach is 18 to 25 feet (5.5 to 7.6 m) above the level of Lake Michigan. The Indiana segment and the Illinois segment, north to Evanston are still visible. North of Evanston and Michigan City, Indiana, the beach has been eroded by later ice movement or shoreline wave action.

The Toleston beach appeared to be present at Holland, Michigan, at the eastern end of Black Lake, being built out between the lake and the marsh, which extends east from Holland a short distance. It is there built up to a height of 21 to 22.5 feet (6.4 to 6.9 m) above Lake Michigan, as shown by Goldthwait's levels. From Holland it seems likely to have continued northward to the Grand River, but as that region is extensively covered with sand blown from the modern shore the beach is largely concealed. In Springport, Goldthwait's levels show the beach to be about 21 feet (6.4 m) above Lake Michigan. From the Grand River it appears to run northwestward, passing just east of Little Black Lake on the line of Muskegon and Ottawa counties and coming to the shore of Lake Michigan directly west of the north end of the lake. There is probably no point between Holland and the Grand River where its distance from the present shore exceeds six miles (9.7 km), and throughout much of the distance it probably does not exceed two or three miles (3.2 or 4.8 km).

== Correlations to other glacial landscapes ==
The Toleston beach may have been only partly formed by Lake Chicago. It has a level that was closely approximated if not reached by Lake Algonquin. The occurrence of a lake at this level in Algonquin time makes this beach a part of the Algonquin beach of the upper Great Lakes region. The Algonquin beach carries in a few places molluscan shells, and this beach of Lake Chicago is in places richly supplied with these shells. In this respect it contrasts with the Calumet and Glenwood beaches, from which molluscan remains have as yet been reported at but one locality, near Bowmanville, north of Chicago. Although Lake Algonquin did have two outlets (past Chicago and Port Huron), sufficient reason for its later complete discharge by Port Huron is found in the fact that the latter outlet was through easily eroded drift deposits and the Chicago outlet was over a rock sill.

== Lower beaches ==
Numerous ridges in the southern portion of the Lake Michigan basin at levels a little below that of the Toleston beach probably belong, the higher to Lake Algonquin and the lower to Lake Nipissing. Most of them rise 10 to 15 feet (3.0 to 4.6 m) above Lake Michigan, or about 595 feet (181 m) above sea level, but some reach about 600 feet (180 m) and others not more than 590 feet (180 m). The Chicago outlet seems to have ceased to be functional at the time they were developed, for they in a measure choke up or bridge over its head. Furthermore, they are about as low as the bed of the outlet, so that no depth of water would have been possible along the outlet. These ridges are exceptionally well displayed in the south part of Chicago in the vicinity of the university, and they are even better developed just east of the Illinois-Indiana State line. On a line running north from Gibson station there are by actual count 32 beachlets separated by shallow sags. North of Waukegan a cut bank appears at a level corresponding to that of the beaches in the southern end of the lake basin, its base being 12 to 15 feet (3.7 to 4.6 m) above Lake Michigan level. On the Michigan shore east of Bass Lake in Mason County a cut bank was noted whose level at base is about 12 feet (3.7 m) above Lake Michigan. Slight indications of wave action at a level about 12 feet (3.7 m) above Lake Michigan are found at several other points in recesses along the Michigan shore.

== Sand dunes ==
Attention has been directed to sand ridges and low dunes that are apparently connected with the Glenwood beach. They are, however, inconspicuous compared with the dunes that lie along the modern shore. Wherever the beach is sandy, dunes are in process of formation, from the head of the lake in northwestern Indiana along the entire eastern shore of Lake Michigan to the Straits of Mackinac. The longest uninterrupted stretches are between the mouths of Kalamazoo and White rivers in Michigan and from the vicinity of St. Joseph, Michigan, southwestward past Michigan City, Indiana, to the head of the lake. Very prominent dunes occupy much of the interval between Ludington and Manistee, and a prominent dune belt about 15 miles (24 km) long in northwestern Oceana and southwestern Mason counties extends several miles each way from Pentwater. Many of the dunes reach an altitude of 150 feet (46 m) and in a few places exceed 200 feet (61 m). The highest are confined to a belt scarcely a mile in width, but lower ones appear for several miles back of these, in the sandy area between Holland and Muskegon and in that west from Michigan City. Dunes are lacking chiefly at points where the lake is encroaching on morainic ridges, as on those of the Lake Border morainic system in the southern end of the basin.

== See also ==
- Calumet Shoreline
- Glenwood Shoreline
- Tinley Moraine
- Valparaiso Moraine
- Kankakee Outwash Plain
