= WEGT =

WEGT may refer to:

- WEGT (FM), a radio station (89.9 FM) licensed to serve Greensburg, Indiana, United States
- WXTY, a radio station (99.9 FM) licensed to serve Lafayette, Florida, United States, which held the call sign WEGT from 2002 to 2010
