= Lake Chicago =

Prehistoric lake from the Wisconsin Glacial Period

Coordinates: 42.2°N 87.1°W

- Map of middle stage of glacial Lake Chicago, USGS Report of 1915.

- Location within Illinois
- Location: North America
- Group: Great Lakes
- Lake type: former lake
- Primary inflows: Laurentide Ice Sheet
- Primary outflows: Chicago River
- Basin countries: United States
- First flooded: 18,000 years before present
- Max. length: 241 mi (388 km)
- Max. width: 57 mi (92 km)
- Average depth: 160 ft (49 m)
- Residence time: 4000 years in existence
- Surface elevation: 160 ft (49 m)
- References: The Pleistocene of Indiana and Michigan and the History of the Great Lakes; Frank Leverett and Frank B. Taylor; Monographs of the United States Geological Survey; Volume LIII; Washington; 1915

Lake Chicago was a prehistoric proglacial lake that is the ancestor of what is now known as Lake Michigan, one of North America's five Great Lakes. Formed about 13,000 years ago and fed by retreating glaciers, it drained southwest through the Chicago Outlet River.

== Origin ==
The city of Chicago lies in a broad plain that, hundreds of millions of years ago, was part of a great interior basin covered by warm, shallow seas. These seas covered portions of North America from the Arctic Ocean to the Gulf of Mexico. Evidence of these seas is found in the fossils of coral, such as those unearthed in Illinois quarries at Stony Island Avenue, Thornton Quarry, and McCook, Illinois, or at 18th Street and Damen Avenue in Chicago. Evidence may also be found in the fossils in the Niagara limestone bedrock found throughout the Chicago area and extending all the way to Niagara, New York.

Much later, the polar ice cap crept four times down across the continent, covering the region with ice to a depth of a mile (1500 m) or more. As the climate changed, the ice melted, the last great ice flow (the Wisconsin Glacier of the Pleistocene period, which covered much of the northern half of North America) retreated, and an outlet for the melting water developed through the Sag River and the Des Plaines River Valley around Mt. Forest, in the area known as the Palos. The Kankakee Torrent poured through those valleys, eventually leaving behind the prehistoric Lake Chicago, the ancestor of Lake Michigan.

== Chronology ==
13,000 to 11,000 years before present

Lake Chicago occurred in three stages: the Glenwood, 14,000–12,700 YBP, 60 ft (18 m) above Lake Michigan; Calumet, 12,700–11,000 YBP, 40 ft (12 m) above Lake Michigan; and Toleston, 5,000–4,000 YBP, 20 ft (6.1 m) above Lake Michigan.

The earliest formation of Lake Chicago occurred when the Michigan Lobe of the glacier retreated northward into the basin of modern Lake Michigan, ca 13,000 years ago. The edge of the retreating glacier formed moraines, the Park Moraine in present-day Illinois and the Lake Borders Moraine in Indiana and Michigan.

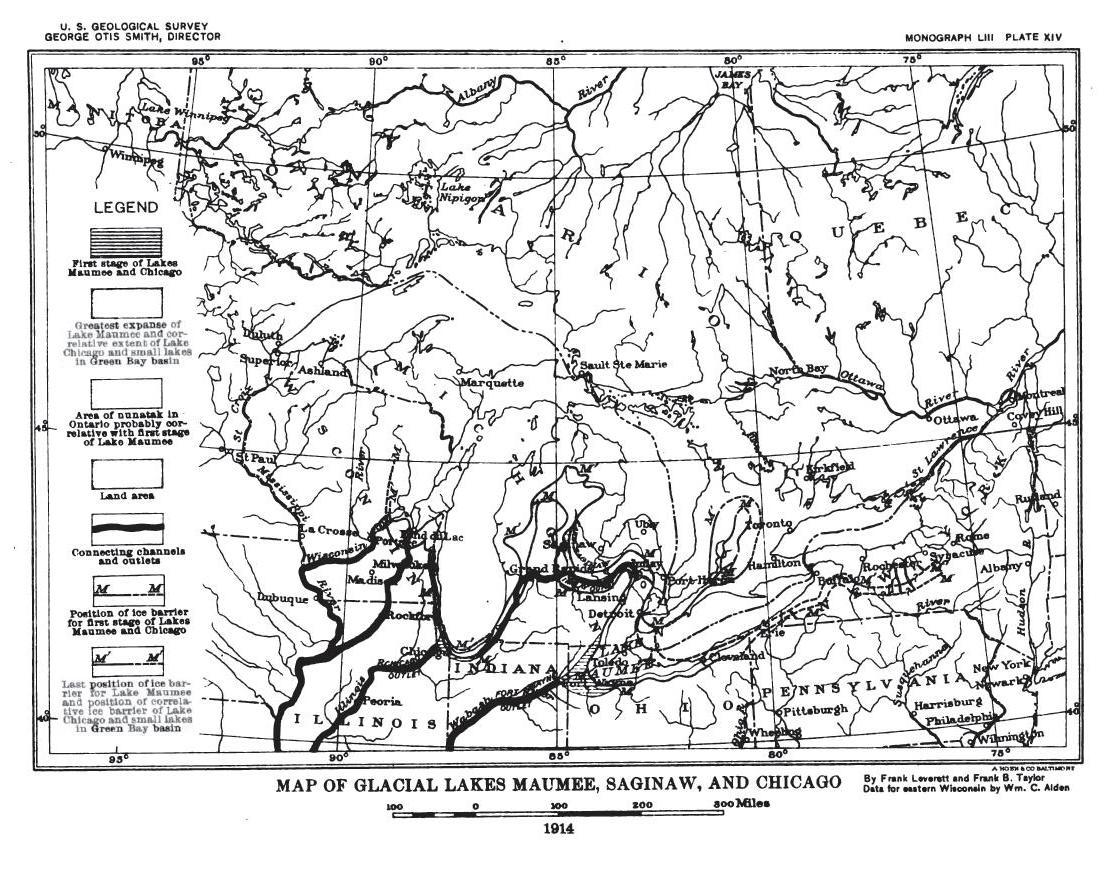
Early Lake Chicago at the edge of the ice sheet, near the head of the Chicago Outlet River, lower left

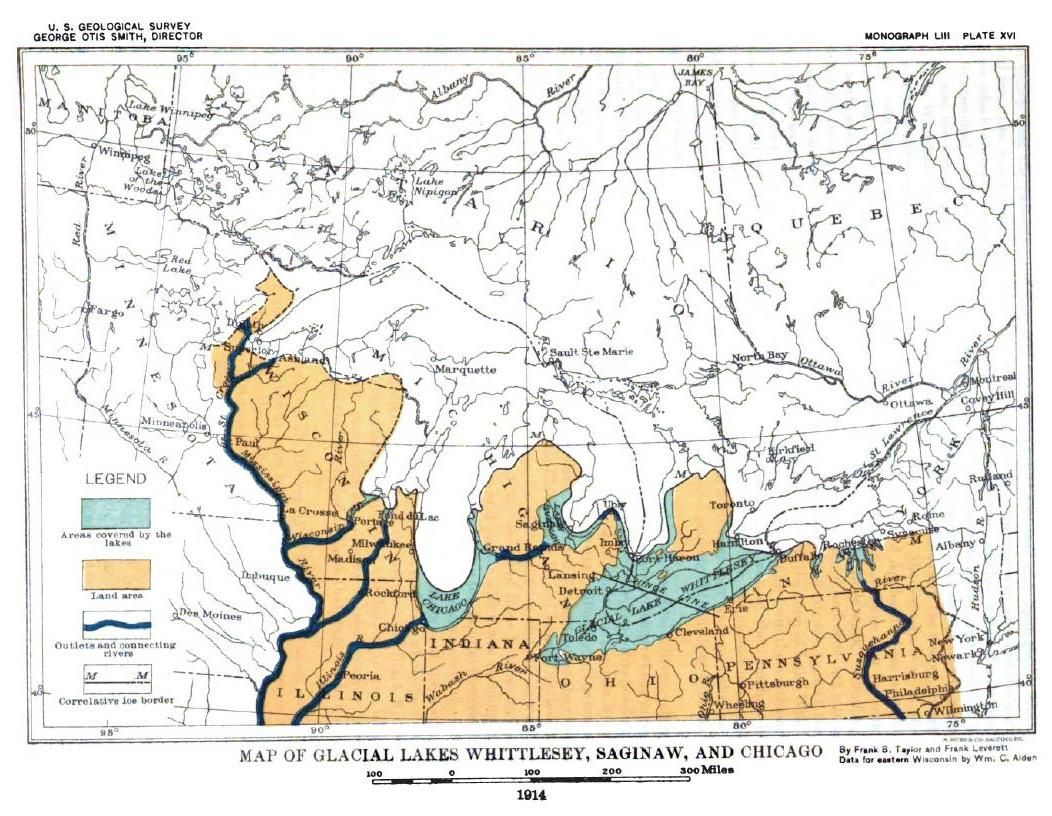
Map of Glacial lakes Whittlesey, Saginaw and Chicago, based on the USGS Report of 1915, Chicago is lower left

The ice continued northward forming the next phase of Lake Chicago. The lake level remained at 640' above sea level, but the ice margin was a third of the way north, opening a channel across Michigan, draining the Lake Saginaw and Lake Whittlesey proglacial lakes in the Lake Huron and Lake Erie basins.

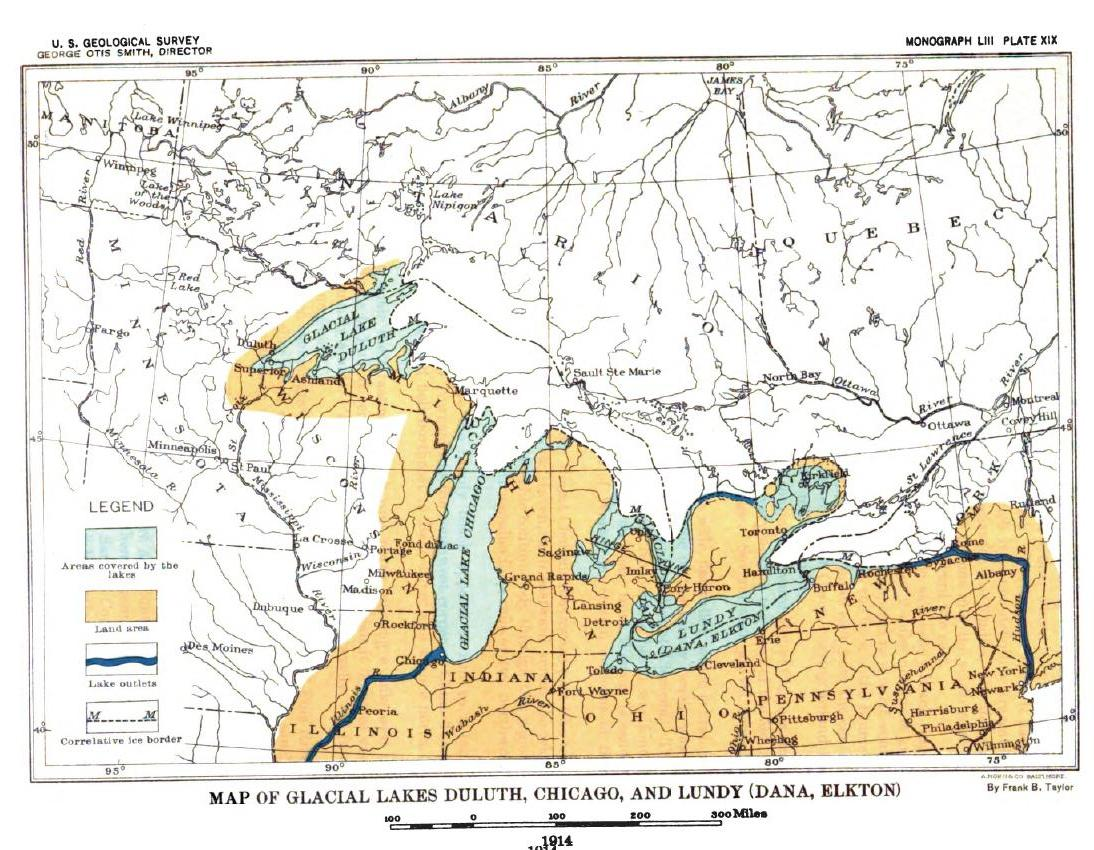
Map of Glacial Lakes Duluth, Chicago, and Lundy (USGS 1915), the Chicago Outlet is lower left

When the ice retreated northward enough to open the Mohawk River valley, the waters in the Lake Huron and Lake Erie basin diverted from the Michigan outlet, leaving Lake Chicago as a headwaters lake. Continued northward migration of the glacier set the stage for the next major proglacial lakes in the Lake Michigan basin as Lake Algonquin and then Nipissing Great Lakes.

== Size ==
Extending somewhat further south, west and east than Lake Michigan, Lake Chicago extended west to present day La Grange, Illinois and south beyond Homewood and Lansing, Illinois, completely covering what is now Northwest Indiana, including the cities of Hammond and Gary, Indiana.

As the Wisconsin Glacier continued to retreat, it created new outlets for the water in Lake Chicago, including Niagara Falls, and the St. Lawrence River. As these outlets were developed, a partial lake capture occurred and the water level in Lake Chicago began to drop in three observable stages of 15 to 20 feet (5–6 m) each. Eventually even the outlet to the southwest dried up, and the Des Plaines River overflowed into the basin that became Lake Michigan.

== Outlet and beaches ==
As the Michigan Lobe of the Labradorean Ice Cap retreated northward, the area of Lake Chicago increased. Lake Chicago's initial outlet was to the southwest through the Des Plaines River valley, thence down the Illinois River to the Gulf of Mexico. The highest beach is the Glenwood Shoreline, which is 55 feet (17 m) to 60 feet (18 m) above the level of Lake Michigan. There are two additional beaches formed when the Des Plaines outlet was abandoned for other outlets to the north and east: the Calumet Shoreline, about 35 feet (11 m) to 40 feet (12 m) above the current lake, and the Tolleston Beach 20 feet (6.1 m) to 25 feet (7.6 m) above Lake Michigan. The name Lake Chicago is used for the lake when it drains through the Des Plaines outlet. The Calumet and Tolleston Beach lake is Lake Algonquin.

The outlet channel is more than 1 mile (1.6 km) wide and cuts through glacial deposits. Near the head of the channel, rock layers have been cut through. It is probable that the distinct beaches from Lake Chicago are the result of these rock layers giving way rapidly, dropping the lake level from higher to lower levels. After each stage, the next barrier remained solid, holding the lake stable and creating distinct beaches. If the outlet were formed by a steady erosion of the barrier, it would have been less likely that the well-defined beaches would have been created.

Along the eastern shore of Lake Michigan, the beaches of Lake Chicago have been destroyed by erosion, except the highest beach, much of which has also been destroyed. The best remaining segments are along the southern tip of Lake Michigan in Indiana.

== Lake bed deposits ==
Lake Chicago covered only a narrow strip of land on the south and east side of modern Lake Michigan. From Holland northward across the Lake Chicago, the lake bed extends 10 to 25 miles (16 to 40 km) inland. The widest expanse is almost entirely fine sand. There is more sand than clay in a narrow strip along the shore. The clayey portions have till at only a few inches depth. The offshore winds along the east shore of Lake Michigan have created sand dunes, burying the older glacial beaches and lake beds.

== Today ==
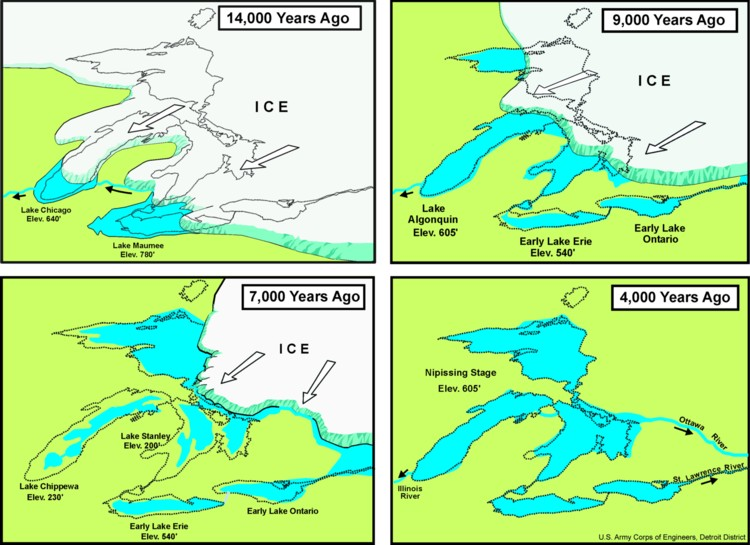
Stages of development of the Great Lakes.

Vast amounts of sand in spits, dunes and beach lines—particularly at the southern tip of Lake Michigan—were left behind by each of the three stages of lake level drop. Today, evidence of these vast sand deposits is still clearly visible. Northern Indiana, for example, contains the Indiana Dunes, and many of the Chicago area's trails and roads follow some of these ancient beach lines or ridges in the sand spits.

For example, Ridge Road from Homewood, Illinois, through Thornton and Lansing, Illinois, and then crossing the state border into Munster and Highland, Indiana, is one; Michigan City Road through Riverdale, Dolton, and Calumet City, Illinois, is another; LaGrange Road is another; Riverside Drive in Riverside; Ridgeland Avenue in Oak Park, or Grosse Point Road, Carpenter Road, and Ridge Avenue (The Rosehill Spit) in the Rogers Park/West Ridge neighborhood of Chicago, north of Devon Avenue and continuing north through Evanston, Illinois, are some others. Blue Island, Illinois, and Stony Island were, literally, islands left behind as Lake Chicago's water level fell.

== See also ==
- Chicago Portage
- Glenwood Shoreline
- Calumet Shoreline
- Tolleston Shoreline
- Lake Border Moraine
- Tinley Moraine
- Valparaiso Moraine
- Lake Chippewa
- Nipissing Great Lakes
- Lake Algonquin
- Lake Michigan
