= Adams Radio Group =

Radio broadcasting company

- Type: Privately held
- Headquarters: Lakeville, Minnesota
- Key people: Ron Stone, President & CEO; Sharon Bordwell, Vice President & Controller
- Products: radio broadcasting
- Website: adamsradiogroup.com

Adams Radio Group is a radio broadcasting company focused on medium to small markets in the United States. Adams began in the early 1980s with radio stations in several markets across the country. The original market stations were all sold by 1996.

The radio station groups in this article were formed in 1996.

== Markets and radio stations ==
=== Fort Wayne ===
- WBTU in Kendallville, Indiana
- WJFX in New Haven, Indiana
- WWFW in Fort Wayne, Indiana
- WXKE in Churubusco, Indiana
- W245CA in Fort Wayne, Indiana
- W277AK in Fort Wayne, Indiana

=== Northwest Indiana ===
- WLJE in Valparaiso, Indiana
- WXRD in Crown Point, Indiana
- WZVN in Lowell, Indiana

=== Las Cruces ===
- KGRT in Las Cruces, New Mexico
- KHQT in Las Cruces, New Mexico
- KSNM in Truth or Consequences, New Mexico
- KWML in Las Cruces, New Mexico
- K283CG in Las Cruces, New Mexico

=== Tallahassee ===
- WHTF in Havana, Florida
- WQTL in Tallahassee, Florida
- WWOF in Tallahassee, Florida
- WXTY in Lafayette, Florida
