= WZVN =

WZVN may refer to:

- WZVN-TV, a television station (channel 28, virtual 26) licensed to Naples, Florida, United States
- WZVN (FM), a radio station (107.1 FM) licensed to Lowell, Indiana, United States
