= WHTF =

Coordinates: 30.587°N 84.236°W

- Havana, Florida; United States
- Broadcast area: Tallahassee, Florida
- Frequency: 104.9 MHz
- Branding: Hot 104.9

Programming
- Format: Top 40 (CHR)
- Affiliations: Premiere Networks

Ownership
- Owner: Adams Radio Group; (ARG of Tallahassee LLC)
- Sister stations: WXTY, WQTL, WWOF

History
- First air date: 1986 (as WHFL)
- Former call signs: WHFL (1981–1987); WMLO 1987-1997); WFLV (1997–1999)
- Call sign meaning: Hot; Tallahassee; Florida

Technical information
- Licensing authority: FCC
- Facility ID: 18550
- Class: C2
- ERP: 47,000 watts
- HAAT: 154 meters (505 ft)

Links
- Public license information: Public file; LMS
- Webcast: Listen Live
- Website: hot1049.com

WHTF (104.9 FM) is a Top 40 (CHR) radio station in the Tallahassee, Florida market owned by Adams Radio Group, through licensee ARG of Tallahassee LLC. Its studios are located in northeast Tallahassee, and its transmitter is based in Bradfordville, Florida.
