= WQTL =

Coordinates: 30.494°N 84.233°W

- Tallahassee, Florida; United States
- Frequency: 106.1 MHz
- Branding: Q106

Programming
- Format: Classic rock

Ownership
- Owner: Adams Radio Group; (ARG of Tallahassee LLC)
- Sister stations: WXTY, WHTF, WWOF

History
- First air date: 1992; 34 years ago (as WRZK)
- Former call signs: WRZK (1992–1996); WWLD (1996); WUTL (1996–2008)
- Call sign meaning: Q Tallahassee

Technical information
- Licensing authority: FCC
- Facility ID: 31792
- Class: A
- ERP: 2,250 watts
- HAAT: 165.4 meters (543 ft)

Links
- Public license information: Public file; LMS
- Webcast: Listen Live
- Website: q106rock.com

WQTL is a radio station in Tallahassee, Florida, United States, owned by Adams Radio Group, through licensee ARG of Tallahassee LLC. Its studios are located in northeast Tallahassee and its transmitter is located due north of downtown Tallahassee.

== History ==
From 2009 until April 2, 2012, WQTL aired an oldies/classic hits format as "Q106.1." On April 2, WQTL's oldies format was dropped and the station began stunting with music by The Beatles. A new format was to launch sometime soon. On April 17, 2012, WQTL ended stunting and launched a classic rock/AAA format, branded as "106.1 The Path".

On July 31, 2015, WQTL rebranded as "106.1 The Sound".

On April 11, 2018, WQTL flipped to oldies, branded as "Kool Oldies 106.1".

On December 26, 2023, at approximately 10:50 a.m., after playing "The Load-Out" by Jackson Browne, the station began stunting with the Nintendo Wii menu music. At noon, the station flipped to rhythmic adult contemporary as "Vibe 106.1"; the first song under the format was "Hypnotize" by The Notorious B.I.G.

On September 26, 2025, at 10 a.m., after signing off the "Vibe" format with “Changes” by Tupac Shakur, WQTL began stunting again, running the entire Taylor Swift library as "WQ-Tay-L", doing so ahead of the release of her album and concert film The Life of a Showgirl the following week. The "Vibe" format had completely failed in the Nielsen Audio market ratings, with a pitiful 0.4 ratings in the Spring 2025 books (during the format’s entire existence, the station never surpassed a 1 share (12+) of the market). On October 1, WQTL switched to classic rock as "Q106".

== Previous logos ==
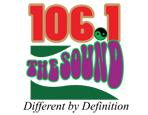
