= Glenwood Shoreline =

Ancient shoreline located in the United States

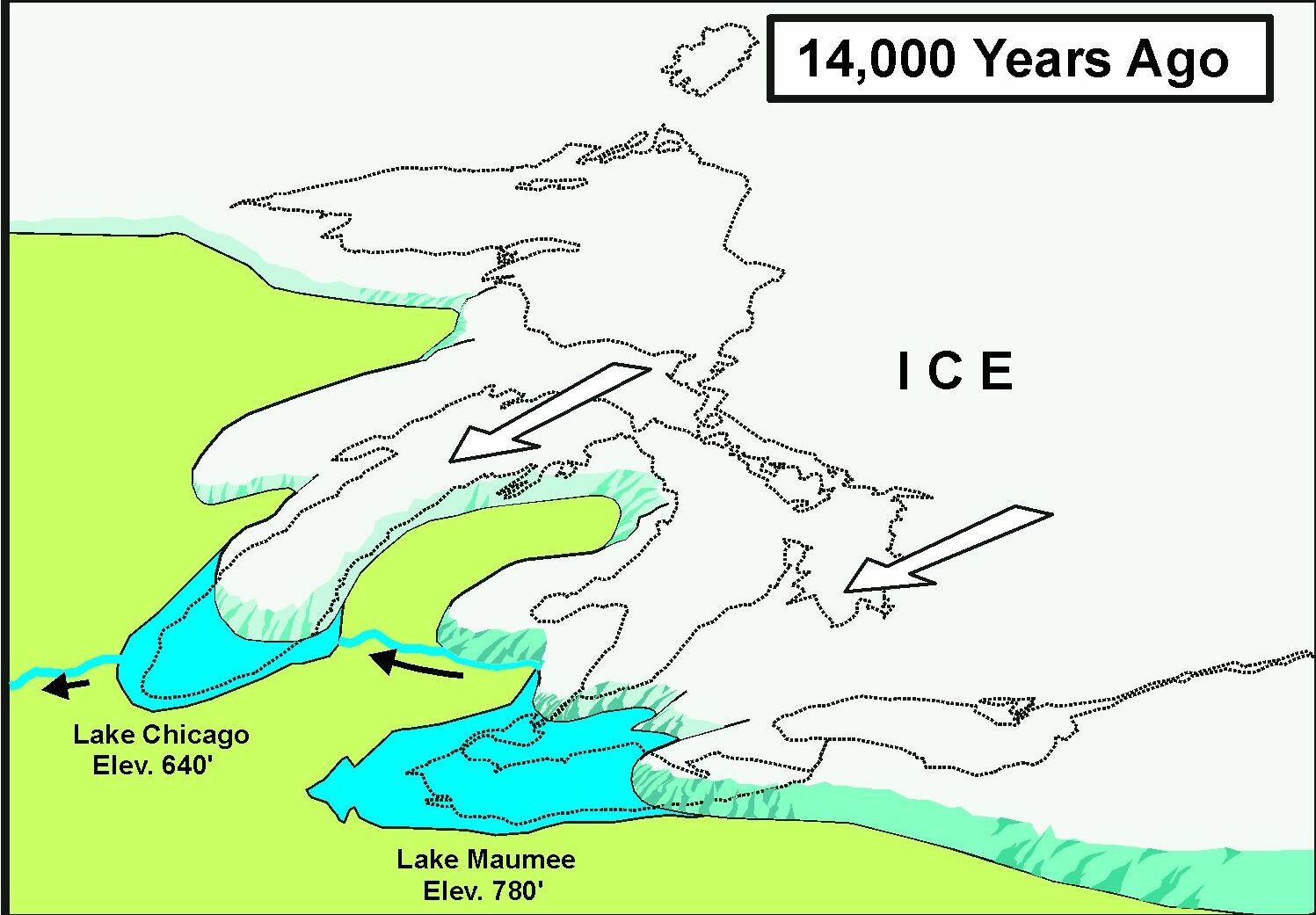
Glacial Lake Chicago at the Glenwood Shoreline

The Glenwood Shoreline is an ancient shoreline of the precursor to Lake Michigan, Lake Chicago. It is named after the town of Glenwood, Illinois. The shoreline was formed when the lake was higher during the last ice age, while ice blocked the Straits of Mackinac. After the straits were freed, the lake receded and left behind a sand ridge at an elevation of about 640 feet (200 m) where the shore resided. This ridge can be seen clearly in Glenwood, Illinois, Dyer, Indiana, and Schererville, Indiana, all south of Chicago.

The two higher beaches of Lake Chicago, the Glenwood and the Calumet, are not visible along the northern part of the Lake Michigan. The readvance of ice lobe may have buried or eroded any northern remains.

== Development ==
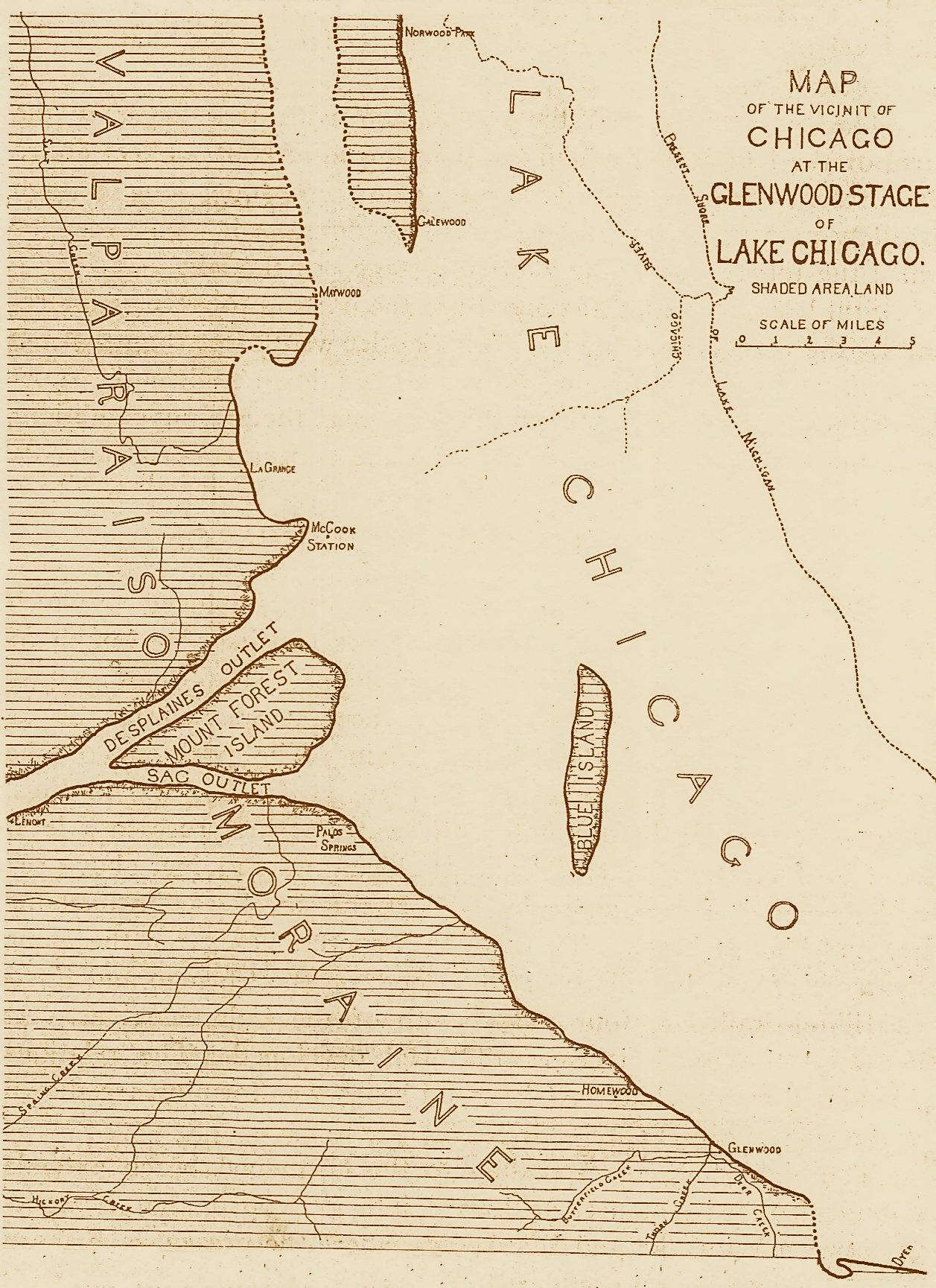
Drawing of Lake Chicago at the Glenwood Stage showing the Chicago area.

The Michigan Lobe of the continental glacier had been growing and receding since 70,000 BCE. The glacier had been static along the Valparaiso Moraine for many years before it again began to recede northward. Around 12,000 BCE the glacier began receding north of the Valparaiso Moraine. The melt waters began to form a lake between the southern front of the glacier and the moraine, which acted as a dam. The water collected until it found a low spot in the moraine, near modern Palos Hills, Illinois. Here, it topped the moraine and began cutting an outlet. At around 640 feet (200 m) above sea level, it stopped cutting downward and a stable lake formed.

== Distribution ==
The Glenwood beach is the highest of the Lake Chicago beaches. In the Wisconsin it lies close to the shore of Lake Michigan. To the north, it has been destroyed by Lakes Nipissing and Algonquin and modern Lake Michigan. Southward into Illinois the remnants are broken, until the area of Winnetka. From here south, the beach is further inland a nearly continuous around the city of Chicago into Indiana. It is continuous through Chesterton and then north into Michigan, where it follows the west edge of Covert Ridge into Holland. The ridge is part of the Lake Border Moraine. The beach reaches back more than 2 miles (3.2 km) from the modern shoreline while in other places, the modern lake as eroded the old beach shore. North of Holland it passes through the Grand and Muskegon valleys and can be from 6 miles (9.7 km) to 20 miles (32 km) from the lake. When the beach reaches10 miles (16 km) north of the Muskegon River it returns to the shore of Lake Michigan. North of this area, the beach ridge has been eroded away. Near Pentwater it remains several miles from modern shore. Around Ludington it is buried by a gravel plain.

== Where to see the shoreline ==
The beach name comes from Glenwood, Illinois. Beginning in Dyer, Indiana, along U.S. Route 30, the beach continues eastward from where U.S. 30 bends southward just east of U.S. 41. Just north of downtown Merrillville it ends. The next segment can be found west of State Route 51 in Hobart, along the southern flank of Deep River.

Leaving Lake County, the beach turns northward. The next visible area is along Salt Creek in Porter County. It is visible on the northern bank from just north of I-80/90, southward across State Route 149. The largest area is just south of downtown Chesterton, Indiana. It extends about 1 mile (1.6 km) east and west of Old SR 49.

== See also ==
- Calumet Shoreline
- Tolleston Shoreline
- Tinley Moraine
- Valparaiso Moraine
- Kankakee Outwash Plain
