= KSNM =

Radio station in Truth or Consequences, New Mexico

- Truth or Consequences, New Mexico; United States
- Broadcast area: Las Cruces, New Mexico
- Frequency: 98.7 MHz
- Branding: Classic Rock 98.7

Programming
- Format: Classic rock

Ownership
- Owner: Adams Radio Group; (ARG of Las Cruces LLC)
- Sister stations: KWML, KGRT-FM, KHQT

History
- First air date: 1984
- Former call signs: KSNM (1984–2000); KSNM-FM (2000–2001); KKVS (2001–2014)

Technical information
- Licensing authority: FCC
- Facility ID: 60322
- Class: C
- ERP: 49,000 watts
- HAAT: 806 meters (2,644 ft)

Links
- Public license information: Public file; LMS
- Webcast: Listen Live
- Website: theclassicrockstation.com

KSNM (98.7 FM, "Classic Rock 98.7") is a radio station licensed to serve Truth or Consequences, New Mexico. The station is owned by Adams Radio Group, through licensee ARG of Las Cruces LLC. It airs a classic rock format. Its studios are located in Las Cruces and its transmitter is located in Caballo, New Mexico.

The station was assigned the KKVS call sign by the Federal Communications Commission on January 1, 2001.
