= WXRD =

Classic rock radio station in Crown Point, Indiana

- Crown Point, Indiana; United States
- Broadcast area: Northwest Indiana; South Suburban Chicago
- Frequency: 103.9 MHz (HD Radio)
- Branding: X Rock 103.9

Programming
- Format: Classic rock
- Affiliations: United Stations Radio Networks

Ownership
- Owner: Adams Radio Group; (ARG of Northern Indiana LLC)
- Sister stations: WLJE; WZVN

History
- First air date: November 10, 1972 (as WFLM)
- Former call signs: WFLM (1972-1982); WWJY (1982–1996); WZCO (7/1996-12/1996)
- Call sign meaning: '"X-Rock"

Technical information
- Licensing authority: FCC
- Facility ID: 39382
- Class: A
- ERP: 1,350 watts
- HAAT: 137 meters (449 ft)
- Transmitter coordinates: 41°19′24.1″N 87°21′22.1″W

Links
- Public license information: Public file; LMS
- Webcast: Listen Live
- Website: xrock1039.com

WXRD (103.9 FM) is a radio station broadcasting a classic rock format using the station name X-Rock 103.9. Licensed to Crown Point, Indiana, United States, it serves Northwest Indiana and Chicago's south suburbs. The station is currently owned by Adams Radio Group, through licensee ARG of Northern Indiana LLC. The station also features national and local newscasts.

== History ==
The station began broadcasting November 10, 1972, holding the call sign WFLM, and airing an easy listening format, as the "World's Finest Listening Music". The station was originally owned by John Meyer. In 1982, the station's call sign was changed to WWJY, and the station was branded "Joy"/"South Lake 104". In 1993, John Meyer sold the station to M & M Broadcasting, owned by former Hammond, Indiana, mayor Thomas McDermott Sr., for $600,000. On March 1, 1993, the station's format was changed from easy listening to CHR. In 1995, the station began to simulcast the rock format of WABT 103.9 in Dundee, Illinois.

In 1996, the station was sold to Z-Spanish Network, along with WABT, for $3.6 million, and the station adopted a Spanish language format, as "La Zeta". On July 1, 1996, the station's call sign was changed to WZCO. The station would go silent shortly thereafter, before switching to a country music format in November 1996, with programming from Real Country, under a Local marketing agreement with M & M Broadcasting, who was in the process of purchasing the station. On December 2, 1996, the station's call sign was changed to WXRD. By 2002, the station's format had been changed to classic rock. In 2004, the station was sold to Radio One Communications, along with WZVN, for $4.9 million. The station was purchased by Adams Radio Group in 2014.

After 18 years, WXRD pulled The Bob and Tom Show off the air on June 17, 2019, and began a locally produced classic rock morning show. As of December 2021, Nights with Alice Cooper was the station's only syndicated day-part.

Effective June 9, 2023, Adams Radio Group's portfolio of 18 stations and translators, including WXRD, was sold for $12.6 million.
