= KHQT =

Radio station in Las Cruces, New Mexico

Coordinates: 32.405°N 106.762°W

- Las Cruces, New Mexico; United States
- Frequency: 103.1 MHz
- Branding: Hot 103.1

Programming
- Format: Top 40 (CHR)
- Affiliations: Compass Media Networks

Ownership
- Owner: Adams Radio Group; (ARG of Las Cruces LLC)
- Sister stations: KWML, KSNM, KGRT-FM

History
- First air date: January 22, 1975 (first license granted)
- Call sign meaning: Sounds like "hot"

Technical information
- Licensing authority: FCC
- Facility ID: 33475
- Class: A
- ERP: 1,000 watts
- HAAT: 168 meters (551 ft)

Links
- Public license information: Public file; LMS
- Webcast: Listen Live
- Website: hot103.fm

KHQT (103.1 FM, "Hot 103.1") is a radio station in Las Cruces, New Mexico. It broadcasts a Contemporary hit radio format for that area. It is owned by ARG of Las Cruces LLC, a subsidiary of Adams Radio Group. Its studios are located in Las Cruces and its transmitter is located north of the city.
