= WLJE =

Country music radio station in Valparaiso, Indiana

- Valparaiso, Indiana; United States
- Broadcast area: Northwest Indiana
- Frequency: 105.5 MHz
- Branding: Indiana 105

Programming
- Format: Country
- Affiliations: Westwood One

Ownership
- Owner: Adams Radio Group; (ARG of Northern Indiana LLC)
- Sister stations: WXRD, WZVN

History
- First air date: October 6, 1967 (as WAKE-FM)
- Former call signs: WAKE-FM (1967–1971)
- Call sign meaning: Len J. Ellis (original owner)

Technical information
- Licensing authority: FCC
- Facility ID: 53056
- Class: A
- ERP: 1,250 watts
- HAAT: 156 meters (512 ft)
- Transmitter coordinates: 41°31′28.1″N 87°1′8.1″W

Links
- Public license information: Public file; LMS
- Webcast: Listen live
- Website: indiana105.com

WLJE (105.5 FM) is a radio station that has been broadcasting a country music format for over 35 years. Licensed to Valparaiso, Indiana, United States, it serves Northwest Indiana. The station is owned by Adams Radio Group, through licensee ARG of Northern Indiana LLC, and features local programming along with the syndicated Nights with Elaina country music program via Westwood One. The station also features national and local newscasts.

== History ==
The station began broadcasting on October 6, 1967, and originally held the call sign WAKE-FM, sister station to AM 1500 WAKE. Its call sign was changed to WLJE on May 1, 1971. The station was originally owned by Porter County Broadcasting Corporation. For most of the station's history, it has aired a country music format. However, in the early 1970s, the station aired an easy listening format. Porter County Broadcasting Corporation's name was changed to Radio One Communications in 1993. In 2014, the station was sold to Adams Radio Group.

Effective June 9, 2023, Adams Radio Group's portfolio of 18 stations and translators, including WLJE, was sold for $12.6 million.
