= WZVN (FM) =

Radio station in Lowell, Indiana

- Lowell, Indiana; United States
- Broadcast area: Northwest Indiana; South Suburban Chicago
- Frequency: 107.1 MHz
- Branding: Z-107.1

Programming
- Format: Adult contemporary

Ownership
- Owner: Adams Radio Group; (ARG of Northern Indiana LLC)
- Sister stations: WLJE, WXRD

History
- First air date: November 24, 1972
- Former call signs: WLCL-FM (1972–1981)

Technical information
- Licensing authority: FCC
- Facility ID: 24727
- Class: A
- ERP: 2,650 watts
- HAAT: 152 meters (499 ft)
- Transmitter coordinates: 41°19′24″N 87°21′22″W

Links
- Public license information: Public file; LMS
- Webcast: Listen live
- Website: z1071fm.com

WZVN (107.1 FM, "Z-107.1") is an American radio station broadcasting an adult contemporary music format. Licensed to Lowell, Indiana, United States, it serves Northwest Indiana and Chicago's south suburbs. The station is owned by Adams Radio Group, through licensee ARG of Northern Indiana LLC. The station also features national and local newscasts. The WZVN tower is located on Indiana State Road 55 just north of Indiana State Road 2.

== History ==
The station began broadcasting on November 24, 1972, and held the call sign WLCL-FM, which stood for Lowell and Cedar Lake. WLCL-FM was owned by William J. Dunn and aired a full service format, with an assortment of community programming and local news.

In 1981, the station was sold to White Advertising Metro for $250,000. Later that year, its call sign was changed to WZVN. The community programming was phased out and the station aired an adult contemporary format, as "Z-107".

In 1987, the station was sold to Gracol Broadcasting, making WZVN a sister station of AM 1230 WJOB. In 1996, WZVN and WJOB were sold to M&M Broadcasting, a firm led by former Hammond, Indiana, mayor Thomas McDermott Sr., for $5.3 million. In 2004, the station was sold to Radio One Communications, along with 103.9 WXRD, for $4.9 million. The station was purchased by Adams Radio Group in 2014.

Effective June 9, 2023, Adams Radio Group's portfolio of 18 stations and translators, including WZVN, was sold for $12.6 million.

WZVN is a member of the Indiana Broadcasters Association.
