= WWOF =

Coordinates: 30.494°N 84.233°W

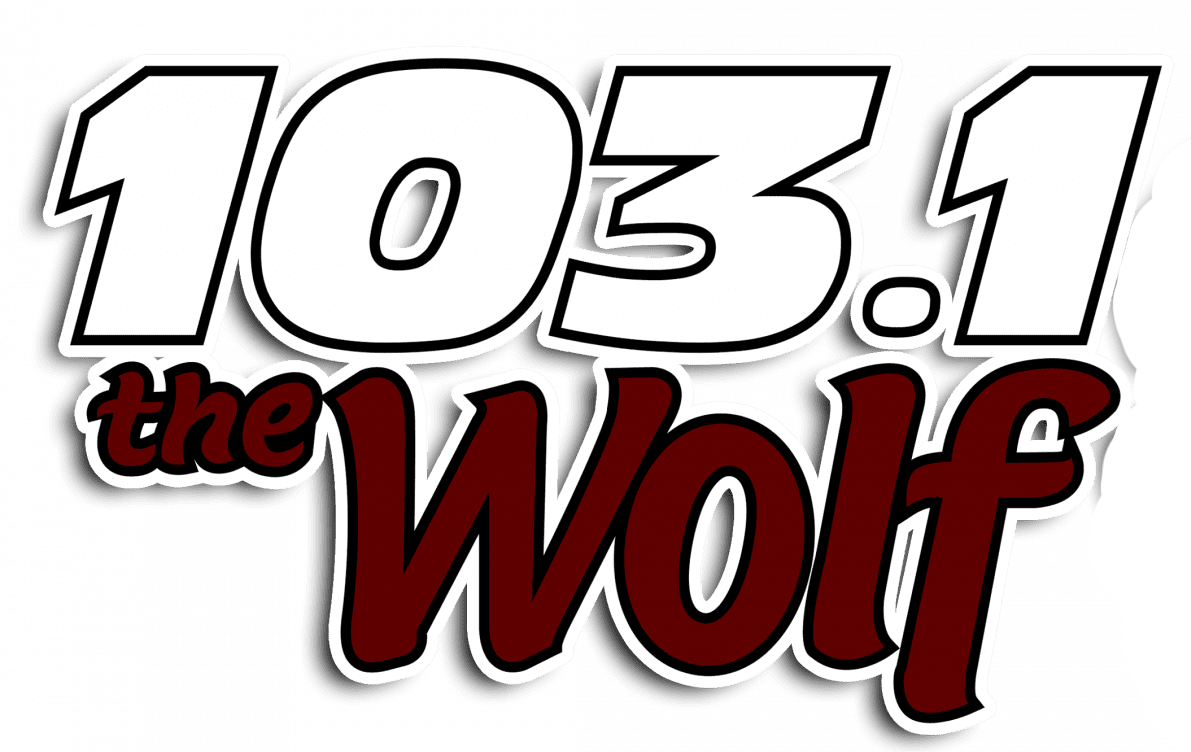
- Tallahassee, Florida; United States
- Broadcast area: Tallahassee, Florida
- Frequency: 103.1 MHz
- Branding: 103.1 The Wolf

Programming
- Language: English
- Format: Country

Ownership
- Owner: Adams Radio Group; (ARG of Tallahassee LLC)
- Sister stations: WXTY, WHTF, WQTL

History
- First air date: May 12, 1976 (as WOWD)
- Former call signs: WOWD (1976–1985); WFHT (1985–1991); WUMX (1991–1995); WAIB (1995–2010)
- Call sign meaning: The Wolf

Technical information
- Licensing authority: FCC
- Facility ID: 9312
- Class: C1
- ERP: 100,000 watts
- HAAT: 198 meters

Links
- Public license information: Public file; LMS
- Webcast: Listen Live
- Website: 1031thewolf.com

WWOF (103.1 FM) is a radio station in the Tallahassee, Florida, area owned by Adams Radio Group, through licensee ARG of Tallahassee LLC. The station airs a country music format.

The WWOF studios are located at 2222 Old St. Augustine Rd. in Tallahassee, and the transmitter is located near the Killearn area of Tallahassee.

== History ==
The station began broadcasting on May 12, 1976, as WOWD, airing a middle of the road format. In 1978, the station switched to an album rock format and was known as D-103, “The Rock of Tallahassee “. In March 1985, the station became a Top 40/CHR station known as "Z103", competing against WGLF. WTHZ became the dominant Top 40 station for the Tallahassee market right after WGLF switched to album rock in 1988. It was an affiliate of Scott Shannon's Rockin' America Top 30 during its CHR years. The station's call sign changed to WUMX, and flipped to a Hot AC format as "Mix 103.1", in February 1991. The station dropped Hot AC for its current country format in February 1995 and changed its call sign again to WAIB, "New Country B103". With Robb Rose and Julie Miles mornings, Jeff Horn middays, Jason Taylor afternoons and Geno 7pm-Midnight. It had some ratings success against cross town rival WTNT, but Its call sign changed again to WWOF in 2010 and became the current "103.1 The Wolf".
