= Lake Stanley =

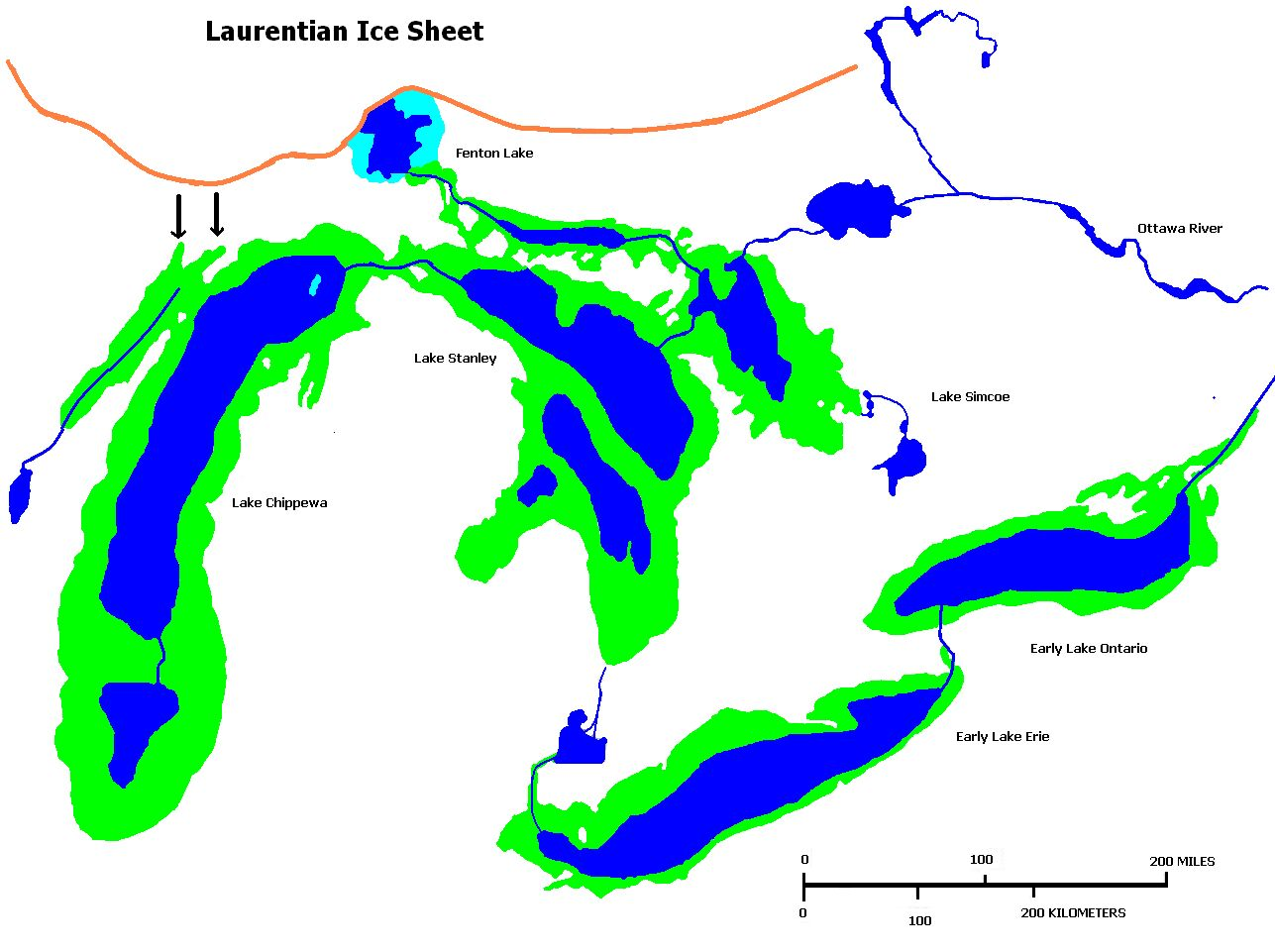
- Glacial Lakes Chippewa, Stanley, Early Erie and Early Ontario. Low level lake stages during the end of the Wisconsin Glacial era in North America. Based on Larsen map, 1987.

- Location within North America
- Location: North America
- Group: Great Lakes
- Coordinates: 44.8°N 82.4°W
- Lake type: former lake
- Etymology: George M. Stanley
- Primary inflows: Lake Chippewa basin
- Primary outflows: French River (Ontario)
- Basin countries: Canada; United States
- Max. length: 241 mi (388 km)
- Max. width: 57 mi (92 km)
- Residence time: 1850 years in existence
- Surface elevation: 476 ft (145 m)
- References: Lewis CFM, Cameron GDM, Anderson TW, Heil CW Jr, Gareau PL. 2012. Lake levels in the Erie Basin of the Laurentian Great Lakes. Journal of Paleolimnology 47:493-511.

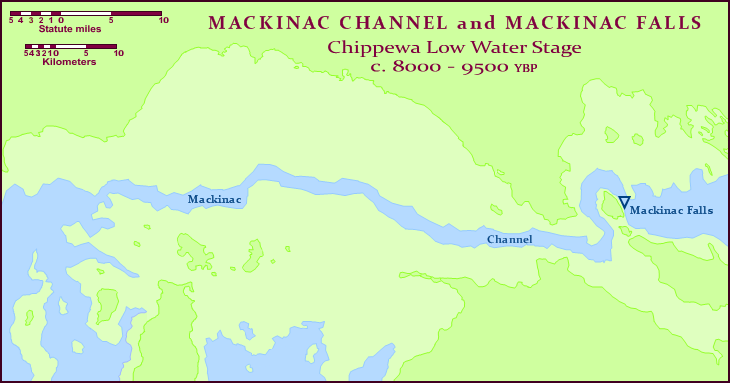
Water flowed eastward into Lake Stanley from Lake Chippewa through the Mackinac Channel.

Lake Stanley, also called the Stanley unconformity, is a postglacial freshwater lake that occupied part of what is now the basin of Lake Huron during a hydrologically significant period from 10,000 years Before Present (B.P.). The lake’s surface level was approximately 70 meters below the current lake’s water surface.

The lake, although geographically smaller than the current Lake Huron, was fed from a large Lake Chippewa watershed that included the basin of what is now Lake Michigan. During this period, the water from Lake Stanley drained through an outlet or outlets adjacent to what is now North Bay, Ontario.

== Research ==
The lake’s now-submerged shoreline has enabled some research to be done into ecological conditions during this time period. Research, published in 2009, described placements of stones near a section of Lake Stanley shoreline that could be interpreted as hunting infrastructure; authors O’Shea and Mathews suggested that the stones, now underwater, could have been gathered and placed as “drive lanes” to force or entice migratory caribou into a human ambush.

Lake Stanley was, however, short-lived. Starting about 8,500 B.P., the geological conditions that had created Lake Stanley underwent a series of changes. North of a geological “tilt line,” the subsurface terrain of the Canadian Shield, no longer weighed down by glacial ice, rebounded and closed off the North Bay outflow. “Rising water in the Lake Huron basin inundated the Mackinac Straits after 8,150 yr B.P.”, ending the existence of Lake Stanley and later creating the present-day Lake Michigan-Lake Huron lake complex.
