= KWML =

Radio station in Las Cruces, New Mexico

- Las Cruces, New Mexico; United States
- Broadcast area: El Paso metropolitan area
- Frequency: 570 kHz
- Branding: Kool 104.5

Programming
- Format: Rhythmic AC
- Affiliations: Compass Media Networks; Premiere Networks

Ownership
- Owner: Adams Radio Group; (ARG of Las Cruces LLC)
- Sister stations: KGRT-FM; KHQT; KSNM

History
- First air date: 1955
- Former call signs: KGRT (1955–2000); KSNM (2000–2014); KGRT (2014)

Technical information
- Licensing authority: FCC
- Facility ID: 63950
- Class: D
- Power: 5,000 watts (day); 155 watts (night)
- Transmitter coordinates: 32°18′33.3″N 106°49′26″W
- Translator: 104.5 K283CG (Las Cruces)

Links
- Public license information: Public file; LMS
- Webcast: Listen live
- Website: 1045koolfm.com

KWML (570 AM) is a commercial radio station licensed to Las Cruces, New Mexico, United States, and broadcasting to the El Paso metropolitan area. Owned by Adams Radio Group, through licensee ARG of Las Cruces LLC, it airs an Rhythmic AC format, with studios on California Avenue in Las Cruses.

KWML's transmitter is sited off of U.S. Highway 70 (Picacho Avenue) near the Rio Grande. Programming is also heard on low-power FM translator K283CG at 104.5 MHz; the FM dial position is used in the station's moniker, calling itself "Kool 104.5".

== History ==
The station signed on the air in 1955 as KGRT. From 2000 to 2014, its call sign was KSNM.

On August 8, 2016, the station changed its format from sports radio to oldies. It was branded as "Kool Oldies 104.5 and AM 570".

On March 8, 2024, KWML changed its format from oldies to rhythmic adult contemporary, branded as "Kool 104.5".

== Programming ==
On weekday afternoons, KWML programming is locally hosted by Gino Aragon. It also carries the nationally syndicated Intelligence for Your Life with John Tesh in the morning. Weekend programming includes Casey Kasem's American Top 40 from the 1970s.
