= KGRT-FM =

Radio station in Las Cruces, New Mexico

Las Cruces, New Mexico; United States
- Frequency: 103.9 MHz
- Branding: Your Country 103.9 KGRT

Programming
- Format: Country

Ownership
- Owner: Adams Radio Group; (ARG of Las Cruces LLC)
- Sister stations: KWML, KHQT, KSNM

History
- First air date: September 8, 1966 (as KGRD)
- Former call signs: KGRD (1966–1983)

Technical information
- Licensing authority: FCC
- Facility ID: 63951
- Class: A
- ERP: 6,000 watts
- HAAT: 46 meters (151 feet)
- Transmitter coordinates: 32°18′33″N 106°49′24″W

Links
- Public license information: Public file; LMS
- Webcast: Listen Live
- Website: kgrt.com

KGRT-FM (103.9 FM, "KGRT 103.9") is a radio station licensed to serve Las Cruces, New Mexico. The station is owned by Adams Radio Group, through licensee ARG of Las Cruces LLC. It airs a country music format. Its studios are located in Las Cruces and its transmitter is located off U.S. Highway 70 (Picacho Avenue) near the Rio Grande.

On-air:
5am-10am: Ernesto Garcia
10am-3pm: Jackie Wilkinson
3pm-7pm: Mason
7pm-midnight: Nash Nights
Overnight: Blair Garner Show

The station was assigned the KGRT call sign by the Federal Communications Commission on June 15, 1983.
