= Valparaiso Moraine =

Moraine in the midwestern United States

Coordinates: 41°30′37″N 87°3′29″W

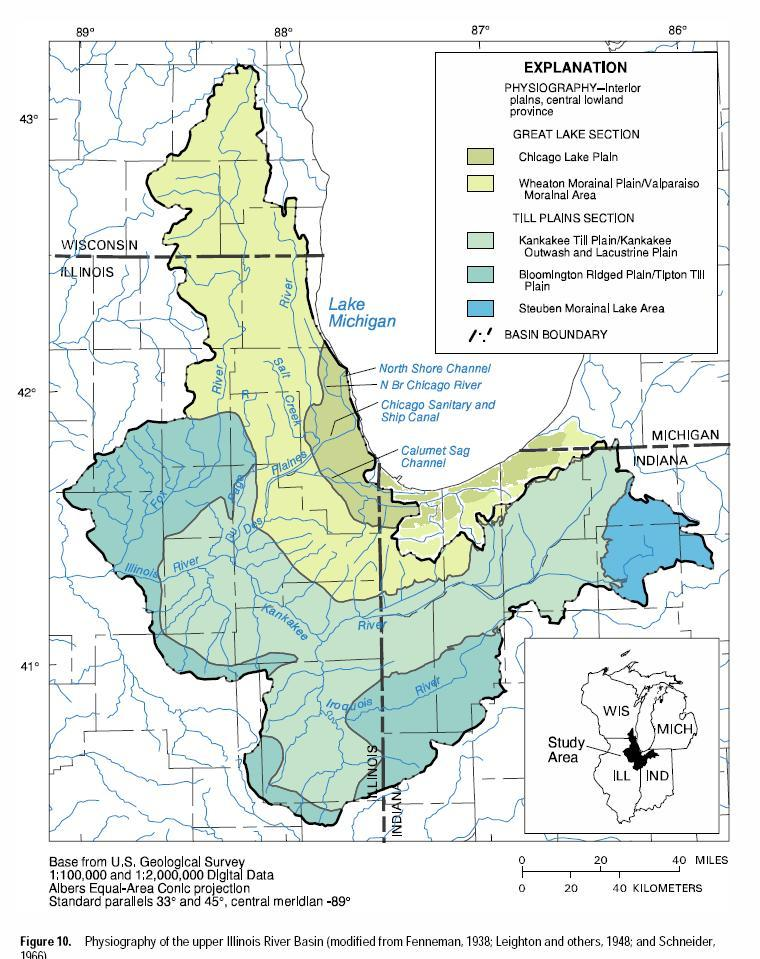
Physiography of the Valparaiso Moraine.

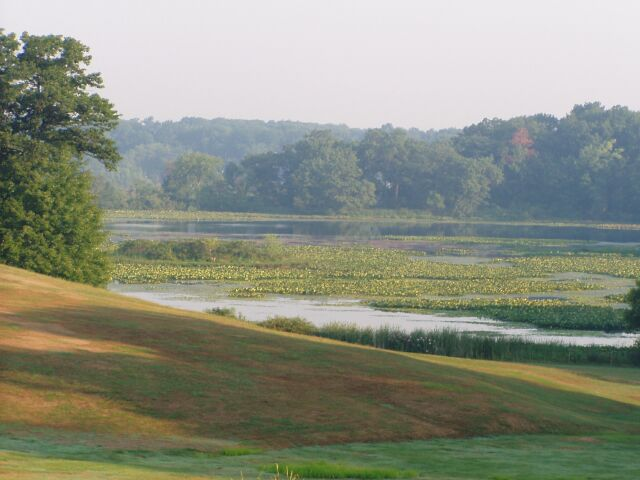
Valparaiso Moraine at Mink Lake, north of Valparaiso, Indiana

The Valparaiso Moraine is a recessional moraine (a landform left by receding glaciers) that forms an immense U around the southern Lake Michigan basin in North America. It is a band of hilly terrain composed of glacial till and sand. The Valparaiso Moraine defines part of the St. Lawrence River Divide, bounding the Great Lakes Basin. It begins near the border of Wisconsin and Illinois and extends south through Lake, McHenry, Cook, DuPage and Will counties in Illinois, and then turns southeast into northwestern Indiana. The moraine curves northeast through Lake, Porter, and LaPorte counties of Indiana into Michigan, where it continues as far as Montcalm County.

The moraine was formed during the Wisconsin glaciation. The glacier covering the area had grown thin, so it was restrained by dolomite rock layers in the Lake Michigan basin. Where the glacier stopped, till and sand were deposited, creating the hills of the moraine. After the Valparaiso Moraine was formed, the glacier retreated further and formed the Tinley Moraine.

Several place names in the region are named after these moraines. The moraine was named after Valparaiso, Indiana, where the moraine is at its highest. As part of the continental divide, many streams have their source in the Valparaiso Moraine. Water on one side of the moraine flows into Lake Michigan, through the Great Lakes, and eventually into the Atlantic Ocean via the Saint Lawrence River, while water run-off on the other side of the moraine flows into tributaries of the Mississippi River, which eventually flows into the Gulf of Mexico. The moraine divide was breached at the Chicago Portage gap by a canal beginning in the mid-19th century.

== History ==
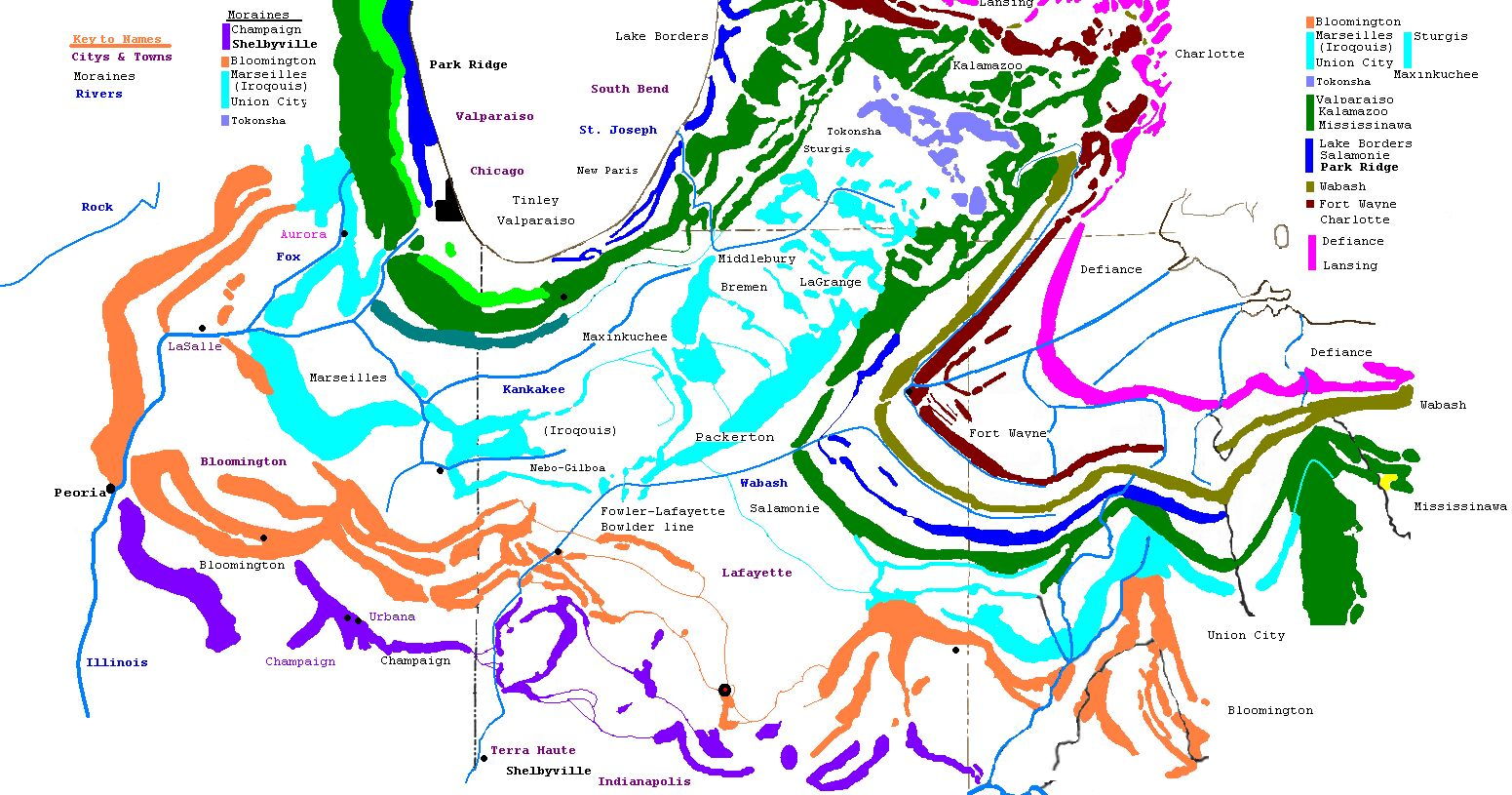
Moraines south of Lake Michigan and southwest of Lake Erie. A composite of three maps (Leverett 1915) (Leverett 1902) (Larsen 1986) and other sources. Colors represent moraines from the same time period of the Wisconsin Glacial epoch

The Valparaiso Moraine formed as the first major moraine of the Cary substage (30,000 years before present) of the Wisconsin glaciation. There are three minor moraines that have been identified in northeastern Illinois: the Minooka, Rockdale, and Manhattan. Within the arc created by the Valparaiso Moraine are two younger Cary substage moraines of the Tinley Moraine and the Lake Border Moraine. Younger still is the Port Huron system, which occurs in the northern portion of the Lake Michigan Basin.

== Location ==
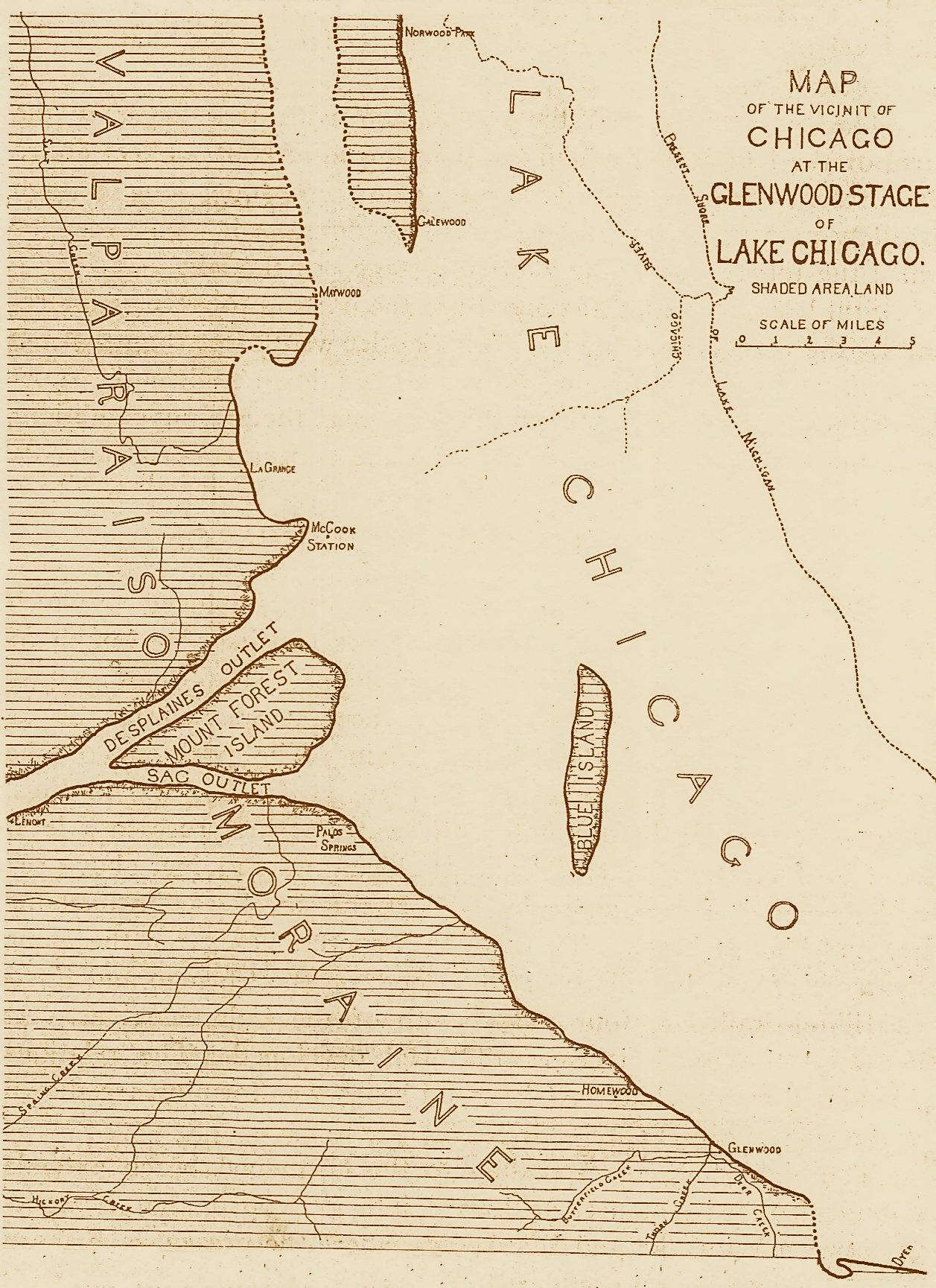
Map of the southwestern coast of Proglacial lake Lake Chicago at the Valparaiso Moraine.

The Valparaiso system includes five moraines north of Chicago. The most northerly reach is to the headwaters of the Fox River in Waukesha County, west of Milwaukee. The moraine angles to the south and east, reaching the headwaters of the Des Plaines River west of Kenosha, Wisconsin. The moraine forms a major portion of the eastern divide of the Fox River basin and then the western bank of the Des Plaines River. The moraine continues southward along the Des Plaines River following the route of the modern Tri-State Tollway (I-294) around the west side of Chicago. Where the Des Plaines River bends to the west and forms the Illinois River, the moraine angles south and east, continuing along I-294 towards Chicago Heights. In this area, the moraine has widened out towards the south and east, becoming a broad plain covering large portions of Will and Kankakee counties.

Turning eastward, the moraine enters Indiana. The moraine is 17 miles (27 km) wide as it passes through Lake County, Indiana, covering nearly half of the county's midsection. As it passes through Porter County, Indiana, it is under the city of Valparaiso, from which it derives its name. Through Indiana, the moraine forms a continental divide between the drainage of the Great Lakes and the Gulf of Mexico by the Mississippi River.

The moraine then turns northeast, passing just north of La Porte, Indiana. Upon entering Michigan the moraine forms much of the shoreline of Lake Michigan northward through St. Joseph. From here northward the moraine angles more eastward, missing Holland and passing through Grand Rapids, finally ending in a mingling of inter-lobe moraines about 50 miles (80 km) northwest of Grand Rapids in Montcalm County.

== Distribution ==
The inner border is less than 15 miles (24 km) and at its closest approach is only about 6 miles (9.7 km) from Lake Michigan. The system is from 5 miles (8.0 km) or 6 miles (9.7 km) up to nearly 20 miles (32 km) wide. It is narrowest in LaPorte County, Indiana, and widest in Lake County, Indiana. In northern Illinois the moraines merge into a composite moraine, including parts of earlier stages.

In Michigan it includes the morainic belt along Lake Michigan, from the Grand River valley southward. In places it consists of two or more ridges. These ridges coalesce and separate repeatedly. In northern Van Buren County it becomes associated with the Saginaw moraine.

== Altitude ==
The moraine runs between 650 feet (200 m) and 690 feet (210 m) above sea level, or 70 feet (21 m) to 110 feet (34 m) above the surface of Lake Michigan. From the inner border there is usually a rise of 100 feet (30 m) or more, with some places more than 200 feet (61 m) rise. The crest in Illinois ranges from about 750 feet (230 m) to 900 feet (270 m) above sea level. The highest point is near Lake Zurich, in southern Lake County. The lowest is on the Des Plaines River, in Will County. In Indiana the crest ranges from 750 feet (230 m) in Lake County to nearly 900 feet (270 m) in LaPorte County. The Michigan section is 670 feet (200 m) to 800 feet (240 m) in near the St. Joseph River and north to the Allegan and Van Buren county line. In Allegan County the moraine has its greatest variation. The highest point is 900 feet (270 m), while the low point near the Kalamazoo River is a little above 700 feet (210 m).

== Thickness of the drift ==
The drift across the Valparaiso moraine and outwash plains is the result of repetitive ice advances and intervening recessions. This drift and the drift from the previous ice sheets of the Illinoian and Iowan glacial periods are present across northeastern Illinois and northwestern Indiana. The early Wisconsin drift are similar to that of the Valparaiso drift that identification of each period is not currently possible.

== Preservation ==
Moraine Nature Preserve is located north of Valparaiso, Indiana. Indiana Department of Natural Resources maintains 809 acres (327 ha). The preserve has numerous trails through rolling ridges and steep hills left by the glaciers. The area includes potholes and a shallow pond. It is covered by a mature beech-maple forest on the high ground and buttonbush and black willow in the ravines, potholes and near the pond.

== Correlative moraines ==
The Lake Erie basin has two moraines of the same age as the Valparaiso Moraine: the Mississinewa Moraine and the Union Moraine. These moraines formed from the Lake Erie Lobe of the continental glacier. In Michigan the Kalamazoo Moraine is of the same time period. It is the result of the Saginaw lobe of the Laurentian ice sheet.

== See also ==
- Geography of Indiana
- List of glacial moraines
- Niagara Escarpment

Glacial features, north to south from Lake Michigan:

- Calumet Shoreline
- Glenwood Shoreline
- Tinley Moraine
- Valparaiso Moraine
- Kankakee Outwash Plain
