= Tinley Moraine =

Moraine in the midwestern United States

Coordinates: 41°35′35″N 87°46′33″W

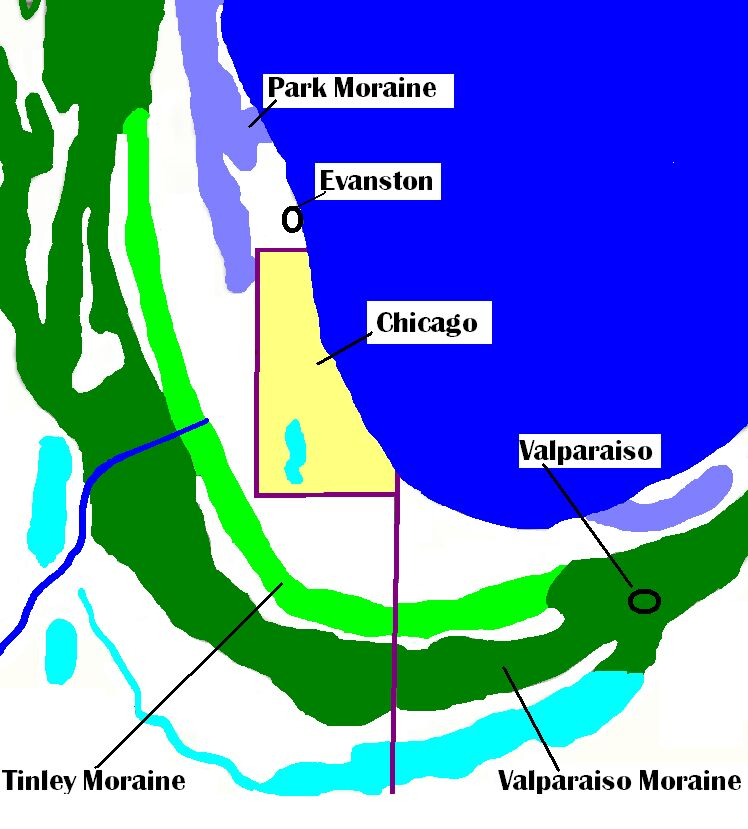
Tinley moraine, a glacial feature of Illinois & Indiana. Based on Publication 6876-12989-1-PB; The Tinley Moraine in Indiana; Allan F. Schneider; Indiana Geological Survey; Indianapolis, Indiana; undated

The Tinley Moraine is a moraine around the Lake Michigan basin in North America. It was formed during the Wisconsin Glaciation and is younger than the higher and wider terminal moraine called the Valparaiso Moraine, which is located farther from the lake than the Tinley Moraine. Compared to the Valparaiso Moraine, the Tinley Moraine is much narrower and occupies a similar swath, about 6 miles (10 km) closer to Lake Michigan, and passes through the communities of Flossmoor, Western Springs, and Arlington Heights. The moraine was named after the village of Tinley Park, a village southwest of Chicago that lies on the moraine.

The Tinley Moraine is a secondary ridge north of the Valparaiso Morainic System. Mapping suggests, that the Lake Michigan Lobe probably receded northward of the Valparaiso Moraine and then advanced towards the Valparaiso Moraine to form the Tinley Moraine. The Tinley Moraine begins as an offshoot of the Valparaiso Moraine in southern Lake County, Illinois, in the kettle lake region around Lake Zurich and follows the eastern crest southward through Des Plaines, Illinois, and Argonne National Laboratory, where it is broken by the Chicago Sanitary and Ship Canal, then sweeping southeast towards Dyer, Indiana. Trending east towards Valparaiso, Indiana, the Tinley Moraine rejoins the Valparaiso Moraine near Wheeler, Indiana. From here, eastward, the remnant Tinley Moraine becomes mixed with the Lake Border Moraine. The Lake Border Morainic System is younger than the Tinley Moraine and dates from the Glenwood stage of glacial Lake Chicago. The Tinley Moraine is considered pre-Glenwood. The moraine is also touching southern Lynwood, Illinois, South of Cook County, Illinois and north of Will County, Illinois.

== Development ==
There is little difference between the soils mixture of the Tinley Moraine and the Valparaiso Moraine. There is a greater quantity of silt and clay similar to a fine grained lake sediments. The clay-rich and pebble-poor till implies that existence of a glacial lake on the margin of the ice. The till mixture predates the Lake Chicago beaches, of which the Glenwood Beach is the oldest and contemporary with the Lake Border Moraine along the Michigan shore. The Tinley Moraine would be an earlier recession of the Michigan Lobe a short ways north, returning southward, with both wind and water driven drifts, mixed with the return of the ice front for a short duration before the northward retreat of the ice front, establishing the Lake Chicago sequence of shorelines and moraine features in northern Wisconsin and Michigan. The impounded meltwater trapped between the ice front and the Valparaiso Moraine, found a breach in the moraine east of the Illinois-Indiana boundary following West Creek into the sluiceway of the Kankakee River. An additional release may have been in the vicinity of the Deep River – Stoney Run divide east of Crown Point.

== See also ==
- Calumet Shoreline
- Kankakee Outwash Plain
- Glenwood Shoreline
