= Kankakee Outwash Plain =

Plain in Indiana and Illinois, United States

Coordinates: 41°5′N 87°30′W

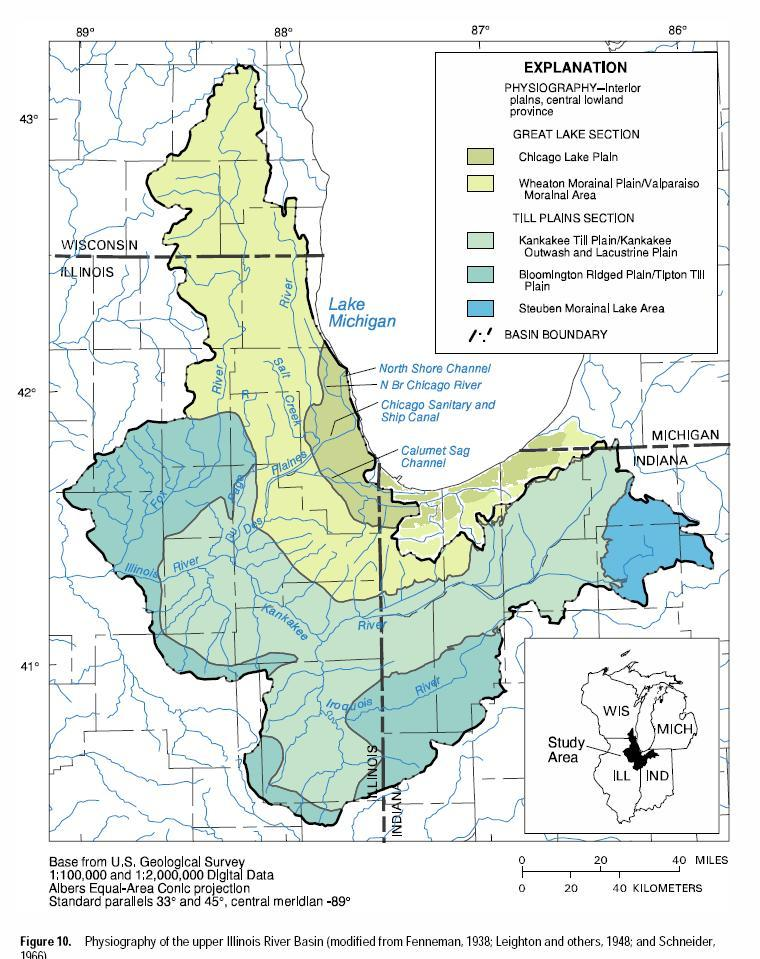
Physiography of the Kankakee Outwash and Lacustrine Plain (pale green area)

The Kankakee Outwash Plain is a flat plain interspersed with sand dunes in the Kankakee River valley in northwestern Indiana and northeastern Illinois of the United States. It is just south of the Valparaiso Moraine and was formed during the Wisconsin Glaciation. As the glacier stopped at the Valparaiso Moraine, its meltwater was carried away to the outwash plain. On the south side of the moraine, where the elevation drops, the meltwaters eroded away valleys, carrying sand and mud with them. As the muddy meltwater reached the valley where the slope lessened, the water slowed, depositing the sand on the outwash plain. This created a smooth, flat, and sandy plain. Before its draining, the Kankakee Marsh, located on the outwash plain, was one of the largest freshwater marshes in the United States.

== Glacial plain ==
The Grand Kankakee Marsh is the result of the last glacial age. The Wisconsin Glacial Episode began 70,000 years ago and removed all traces of the previous glacial topography. It wasn't until the last 3,000 years that the glaciers left the topography we know today. Beginning around 15,000 years ago, the Michigan lobe to the north and the Huron-Saginaw lobe to the east retreated back, leaving the area that was to become the Kankakee's valley clear of ice. Beginning 14,000 years ago, the head of the glacier stood along a line across the middle of Lake, Porter, and LaPorte counties. Melting ceased to outpace the arrival of new ice from the north. Over thousands of years, the glacier moved ground rock and soil southward, only to release along this edge of ice, building up a ridge that matched the front of the glacier. This formed the Valparaiso Moraine.

As soil built up along this front, the spring and summer melt was releasing large volumes of water, which moved and sorted the soils. South of the glacial front, water accumulated faster than it could drain, forming a glacial lake Kankakee. Today, the bedrock is hidden deep beneath the sediments left by the glaciers, but it still played a role in developing the lay of the land. At Momence, Illinois, a ridge of limestone was exposed at the surface. Here, all the water flowing off the front of the glacier had to pass westward, for south of glacial Lake Kankakee, the Iroquois Moraine blocked all drainage. Slight though it might be, it was higher than the limestone ridge. Between the Iroquois Moraine and the Momence Ridge, the waters from the glacier collected.

Lacustrine deposits are those deposited in lake water, and only when the lake drains or the land rises does it become dry land. Most of the soils throughout the counties surrounding the Kankakee are loamy (up to a quarter clay, quarter to half silt, with less than half being sand). The outwash plain is underlain by sand, with gravel inter-bedded throughout. The prevailing westerly winds began to treat the shores of "Lake Kankakee" like the shores of Lake Michigan. Dunes began to form along the southern and eastern shoreline. Where ice blocks had been left behind, sand filled the depressions. Runoff from the Valparaiso Moraine built outwash ridges of sand leading into the lake. On the south, the winds built dunes.

As the volume of water decreased from the glacier melting northward, the lake slowly drained and filled. Not being able to cut a channel through the limestone ridge in Momence, the Kankakee Lake became 500,000 acres (200,000 ha) of marshland.

The outer margin of the Valparaiso Moraine extends from Porter County east into Michigan. It consists of an extensive outwash apron. It slopes to the southeast over an 8 miles (13 km) to 10 miles (16 km) distance, dropping from 775 feet (236 m) or 800 feet (240 m) to 700 feet (210 m) above sea level. It is a gravel plain, which is dissected by Crooked Creek and Mill Creek.

== Location ==
The Kankakee Outwash Plain is located on the southern side of the Valparaiso Moraine. It stretches from just west of the Illinois and Indiana border near Momence, Illinois, along the Kankakee River valley eastward in a northeast arc towards South Bend. In Porter County, Indiana, the plain begins to widen out. It stretches south from Valparaiso to below the Kankakee River, nearly 15 miles (24 km) wide. Moving eastward, the outwash plain in LaPorte County stretches from I-80/90 to the Kankakee River along the Starke County line. As the plain nears South Bend, it compresses between the Valparaiso Moraine, which forms a line from south of Michigan City toward Grand Rapids, Michigan, and the till plain from the Saginaw ice lobe. Along the Michigan and Indiana border, the outwash plain forms a 10-to-15-mile-wide (16 to 24 km) band along the St. Joseph River. The outwash plain comes to an end in LaGrange County, Indiana, east of the border with Elkhart County. The outer margin of the Valparaiso Moraine from Porter County extends east into Michigan. It consists of an extensive outwash apron. Slopes to the southeast over an 8 miles (13 km) to 10 miles (16 km) distance, dropping from 775 feet (236 m) or 800 feet (240 m) to 700 feet (210 m) above sea level. It is gravel plain, which is dissected by Crooked Creek and Mill Creek.

- Kankakee River Plain; - The largest unit of outwash is along the Kankakee River from South Bend to the Illinois border. It is 15 miles (24 km) to 20 miles (32 km) wide including the Kankakee Marsh and the surrounding sand and gravel plains.
- Tippicanoe- Iroquois plain - The next largest unit is along the Tippecanoe River in Fulton County. It extends north into Starke County near Ora. It extends south and west to Monticello and across the southern halves of Jasper County and Newton County and northern White County. This area is drained by Monon Creek and the Iroquois River.
- Marseilles moraine – this is atypical of the region. It is a narrow band of rising ground, which disappears in the east into the lacustrine sand plain.
- St. Joseph, Kalamazoo, and Dowagiac rivers - This section is mostly in southwest Michigan with a portion in northern Indiana east of South Bend on the St. Joseph River. This was the drainage area of three lobes of the Laurentian glacier.

== New theory ==
Recent research on the "Sand Islands" of the Kankakee reveal that the sand is the same type and age as the sands deep in the dunes along Lake Michigan. According to Valparaiso University professor Ron Janke, this would mean that the dunes south of the Kankakee River were formed before the Valparaiso Moraine and at a time when current theories posit that the northern stretches of Indiana were still under the glacial ice.

== See also ==
- Kankakee River
- Kankakee, Illinois
- Kankakee Torrent
- Grand Kankakee Marsh

Geologic features, north to south:

- Calumet Shoreline
- Glenwood Shoreline
- Tinley Moraine
- Valparaiso Moraine

== Sources ==
- Schoon, Kenneth J., Calumet Beginnings, 2003, Indiana University Press, p. 24 ISBN 0-253-34218-X
- 1816-1966, Natural Features of Indiana; Indiana Academy of Science, Indiana State Library, Indianapolis, 1966, Symposium, April 22–23, 1966, Wabash College, Crawfordsville, IN
- Soil Survey of Porter County, Indiana; USDA, Soil Conservation Service, Purdue University, Agricultural Experiment Station, IDNR, Soil and Water Conservation Committee; 1976
- Kankakee Project: Sand Islands Reveal new, Old Clues, VU Professor finds surprising evidence for origin of dunes; Charles M. Bartholomew; Post Tribune, July 6, 2008
