= Calumet Shoreline =

Ancient shoreline of Lake Michigan

Coordinates: 41°33′42″N 87°30′40″W

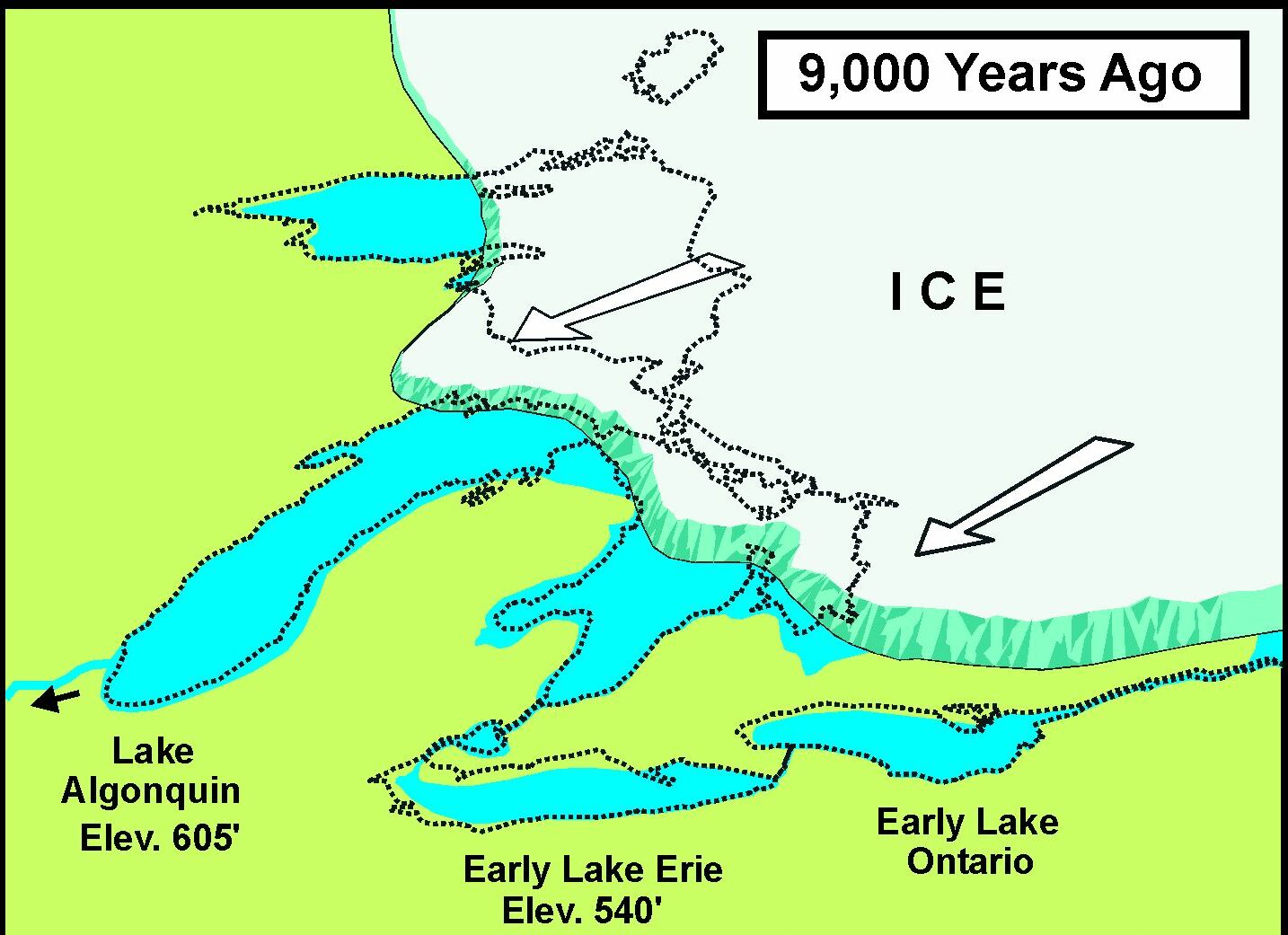
Glacial Lake Chicago when the Calumet Shoreline formed

The Calumet Shoreline is an ancient shoreline of Lake Michigan located in the Lake Michigan Basin. It can be clearly seen as a sand ridge along Ridge Road south of Chicago. Closer to the lake from the Calumet Shoreline, there are the Tolleston shorelines and farther from the lake are the Glenwood Shoreline, the Tinley Moraine, and the Valparaiso Moraine. The shoreline is named after the Calumet Region of Northern Indiana.

== Development ==
The Michigan Lobe of the continental glacier had been stagnant for years, forming the Glenwood Shoreline. Once again, it began a general retreat northwards. The melt waters which formed Glacial Lake Chicago, had more space in which to reside. Then it began to drop. It appears that the outlet to the Illinois River, was cutting downward, keeping pace with the lowering lake. At around 620 feet (190 m), it stopped cutting downward and the lake stabilized.

== Features ==
The Calumet beach opens into the Chicago outlet, and is 20 feet (6.1 m) or 25 feet (7.6 m) below the Glenwood beach. It stands about 35 feet (11 m) above Lake Michigan at the southern end. Along much of the east and west shores the beach has been eroded by the lake. Along these shores, it is more than 12 miles (19 km) from the lake. It takes its name from the Calumet River in northwestern Indiana where it is well preserved. On the south shore it is from 1 mile (1.6 km) to 8 miles (13 km) from the lakeshore, continuing as far north on the west shore to near Winnetka.

== See also ==
- Ridge Road
- Calumet Region
- Geography of Indiana

-glacial feature from north to south of Lake Michigan

- Glenwood Shoreline
- Calumet Shoreline
- Tolleston Shoreline
- Tinley Moraine
- Valparaiso Moraine
- Kankakee Outwash Plain
