= Lake Border Moraine =

Moraine bordering Lake Michigan

Coordinates: 43°0′N 84°30′W

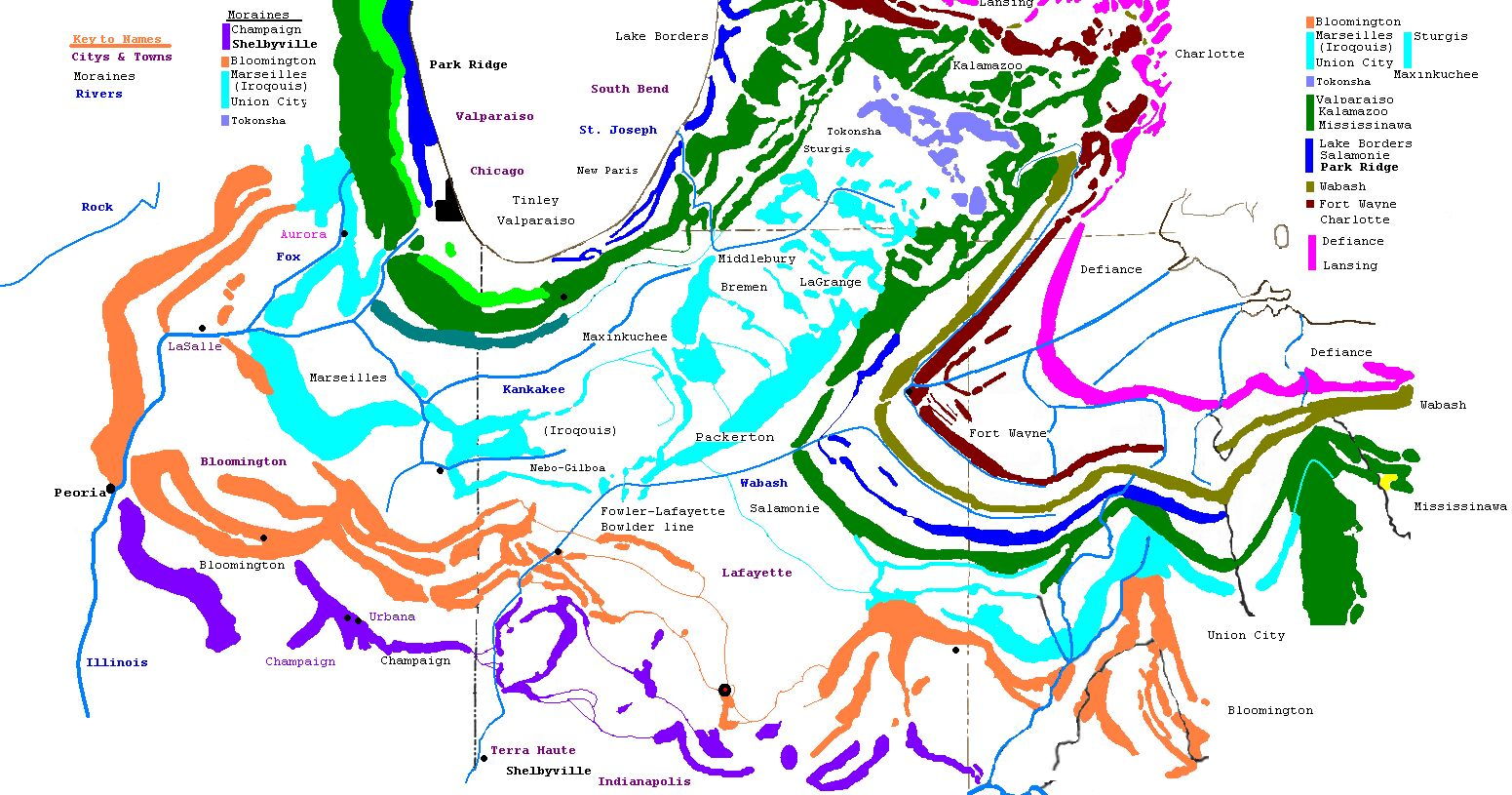
Shown in dark blue, the Lake Border Moraine is located on the east shore of Lake Michigan. It is contemporary to the Park Ridge moraine on the west shore

The Lake Border Moraine (also called the Lake Border Morainic System) is a complex group of moraines bordering the southern end of Lake Michigan. It can be traced north along the eastern shore of the lake basin and across the highlands between the northern Lake Michigan and Saginaw Bay. It continues around the Saginaw Basin into the "thumb" of Michigan, and south through southeastern Michigan on the eastern side of the "thumb." Along Lake Michigan, north to Holland the system is close to the shore. From Holland north to Oceana County it is 15 miles (24 km) to 25 miles (40 km) east of the shore. In Oceana County it forms the prominent "clay banks" along the shoreline of Lake Michigan. It again bears inland from Hart, where more recent moraines reside between it and Lake Michigan. It runs north of the great interlobate moraine that exists between the Lake Michigan and Saginaw lobes of the Laurentian ice sheet. A little north of Cadillac turns to the east. A short distance from Cadillac, it splits with the southern ridge or outer member heading to the Saginaw basin. The northern ridge heads towards Lake Huron, but turns south before reaching the shore. In Newaygo and Lake counties it rest on an earlier interlobate moraine. It separates in Wexford and Missaukee counties to continue south along the west side of the Saginaw basin.

== Topography ==
The outer members of the Lake Border morainic system reach their greatest height immediately north and west of Cadillac, where they attain an altitude of 1,500 feet (460 m) above sea level. The outermost ridge for 20 miles (32 km) west from the line of Missaukee and Wexford counties stands above 1,400 feet (430 m). The south the ridge declines from here, but much of it is above 1,100 feet (340 m). South of Big Rapids there are a few high spots above 1,300 feet (400 m). These continue south to Baldwin. The ridges south of Muskegon River are just under 800 feet (240 m). The steep declines become more gradual towards the south near South Haven where the lake ridges are less than 700 feet (210 m) above sea level. The ridge runs west across Oceana County nearly to Lake Michigan. It has high points of 1,000 feet (300 m) above sea level and some areas above 800 feet (240 m). This is more than 200 feet (61 m) above Lake Michigan The inner ridge is highest in the north near Gaylord. Here, it is nearly 1,400 feet (430 m) high. It lowers steadily to the southwest, but remains above the 1,300 feet (400 m) through Antrim and Kalkaska counties. It remains above 1,200 feet (370 m) through Kalkaska, and drops to 1,100 feet (340 m) as it passes through Grand Traverse County. To the south, it remains near 1,000 feet (300 m) through Grand Traverse County and on to Manistee County. South of Manistee River the ridges on the inner border fall below 800 feet (240 m) with the general surface below 700 feet (210 m)

== Relief ==
Near Cadillac the ridges have a relief of 50 to 100 feet (15 to 30 m) or more above the outwash plain in Wexford County. The inner border is 300 feet (91 m) to 400 feet (120 m) in Wexford County and about 300 feet (91 m) in Lake and Newaygo counties. West from Newaygo County and across Oceana County, the relief is 150 to 300 feet (46 to 91 m) or more above the plains. A slender moraines south from the Muskegon River is less than 100 feet (30 m), become barely 50 feet (15 m) above the lake at its south end

== See also ==
- Glenwood Shoreline
- Lake Chicago
- List of glacial moraines
