= WXTY =

Coordinates: 30.4941°N 84.2324°W

- Lafayette, Florida; United States
- Broadcast area: Tallahassee metropolitan area
- Frequency: 99.9 MHz
- Branding: Tally 99.9

Programming
- Format: Adult hits

Ownership
- Owner: Adams Radio Group; (ARG of Tallahassee LLC)
- Sister stations: WHTF, WQTL, WWOF

History
- First air date: December 17, 1989 (as WQHI)
- Former call signs: WQHI (1989–1990); WHKX (1990–1994); WAIB (1994–1995); WWFO (1995–2001); WYZR (2001–2002); WEGT (2002–2010); WANK (2010–2018)

Technical information
- Licensing authority: FCC
- Facility ID: 9311
- Class: A
- ERP: 5,500 watts
- HAAT: 91 meters

Links
- Public license information: Public file; LMS
- Webcast: Listen Live
- Website: tallyradio.com

WXTY (99.9 FM) is an adult hits radio station in the Tallahassee, Florida market owned by Adams Radio Group, through licensee ARG of Tallahassee LLC. It is branded as "Tally 99.9". Its studios and transmitter are co-located in northeast Tallahassee.

== History ==
On August 31, 2018, 99.9 Hank-FM changed its name to Tally 99.9 to fit the format better and it changed its call sign from WANK to WXTY.
