= Lake Circle =

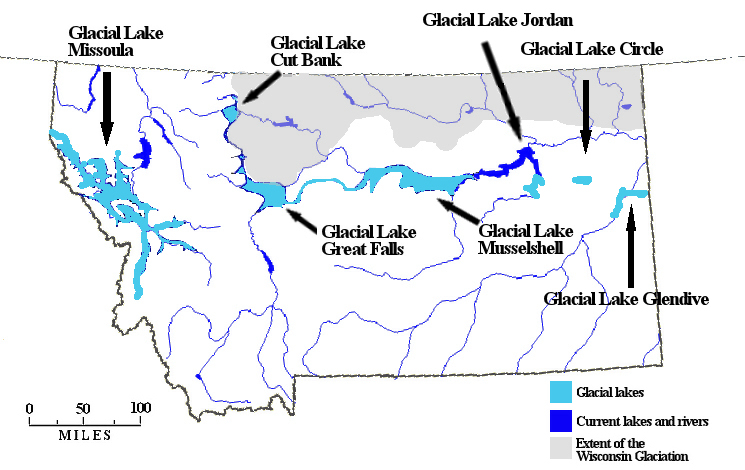
- Map of Montana showing Lake Circle.

- Location within Montana
- Location: McCone at town of Circle and Dawson County, Montana
- Coordinates: 47.541644°N 105.410087°W
- Lake type: Glacial lake (former)
- Primary inflows: Laurentide Ice Sheet
- Basin countries: United States
- Max. length: about 1 mile (1.6 km)
- Max. width: about 45 miles (72 km)
- Surface area: varied
- Surface elevation: 2,020 m (6,630 ft)

Lake Circle was a glacial lake that formed during the late Pleistocene epoch along the Redwater River in eastern Montana. After the Laurentide Ice Sheet retreated, glacial ice melt accumulated in the basin surrounded by the ridges of the preglacial valley and the retreating glacier. Southwest of Nickwall are the remnants of a broad abandoned valley with long side slopes. The valley runs north from Redwater Creek to the Missouri River. The bottom is poorly drained and about 1 mile (1.6 km) in width. It lies 2,015 to 2,020 feet (614 to 616 m) above the sea level and 40 to 50 feet (12 to 15 m) above the Missouri River bottomland. The upland slopes are extensive, clear and flat. The valleys surrounding it are dissected with V-shaped coulees. The difference between the Redwater valley and those around it reflect stream erosion vs. lake sedimentation. The drift in the valleys, appears to be as left by the glacier in the previously created valleys. Using the dating of lake deposits near Great Falls, Montana, the Havre lobe of the Laurentide Ice Sheet dammed the ancestral Missouri River during the late Wisconsin Glacial Period.

== Glacial Event ==
A lobe of the late Wisconsin Laurentide Ice Sheet advanced from central Alberta, southeastward into Montana and southwestern Saskatchewan. It left the Cypress Hills and Boundary Plateau undisturbed. As the glacier crossed the present day Milk River valley in southern Alberta, it was split into two lobes by the Sweetgrass Hills, which became an island in the glacier. The western lobe or Shelby lobe, moved southward to the Missouri River, near Great Falls, Montana. The Havre lobe, east of the Sweetgrass Hills, moved in two directions. The Lorna sublobe, advanced over the Missouri River to north of the Highwood Mountains. The Malta sublobe expanded southeastward along the present-day Milk River, between the Boundary Plateau and the Little Rocky Mountains in the region of the Musselshell River.

== See also ==
- List of prehistoric lakes
- Proglacial lakes of the Missouri River Basin
  - Lake Cut Bank
  - Lake Chouteau
  - Lake Great Falls
  - Lake Musselshell
  - Lake Jordan.
  - Lake Circle
  - Lake Glendive
  - Lake McKenzie

== Bibliography ==
- Alden, W. C., 1958, Physiography And Glacial Geology Of Eastern Montana And Adjacent Areas, U. S. Geological Survey Professional Paper 174.
- Colton, R. B., Lemke, R. W., and Lindvall, R. M., 1961, Glacial map of Montana East of the Rocky Mountains, U. S. Geological Survey Miscellaneous Geological Investigations Map I-327.
- Howard, A. D., 1958, Drainage Evolution In Northeastern Montana and Northwestern North Dakota, Bulletin of the Geological Society of America, v69, 575-588.
- Lemke, R. W., Laird, W. M., Tipton, M. J., and Lindvall, R. M., 1965, Quaternary Geology Of Northern Great Plains, in Wright, H. E., Jr., and Frey, D. G., Eds, The Quaternary of the United States, Princeton University Press, Princeton, NJ.
- Lindvall, R. M., 1962, Geology Of The Eagle Buttes Quadrangle, Chouteau County, Montana, U. S. Geological Survey Miscellaneous Geological Investigations Map I-349.
- Thornbury, W. D., 1965, Regional Geomorphology Of The United States, John Wiley & Sons, Inc., New York.
- Trimble, D. E., 1980, The Geologic Story Of The Great Plains, Geological Survey Bulletin 1493.
- Wayne, W. J., Aber, J. S., Agard, S. S., Bergantino, R. N., Bluemle, J. P., Coates, D. A., Cooley, M. E., Madole, R. F., Martin, J. E., Mears, B., Jr., Morrison, R. B., and Sutherland, W. M., 1991, Quaternary Geology Of The Northern Great Plains, in The Geology of North America, Vol K-2, Quaternary Nonglacial Geology: Conterminous U. S., The Geological Society of America.

== Bibliography ==
- Alden, W. C., 1958, Physiography And Glacial Geology Of Eastern Montana And Adjacent Areas, U. S. Geological Survey Professional Paper 174.
- Colton, R. B., Lemke, R. W., and Lindvall, R. M., 1961, Glacial map of Montana East of the Rocky Mountains, U. S. Geological Survey Miscellaneous Geological Investigations Map I-327.
- Howard, A. D., 1958, Drainage Evolution In Northeastern Montana and Northwestern North Dakota, Bulletin of the Geological Society of America, v69, 575-588.
- Lemke, R. W., Laird, W. M., Tipton, M. J., and Lindvall, R. M., 1965, Quaternary Geology Of Northern Great Plains, in Wright, H. E., Jr., and Frey, D. G., Eds, The Quaternary of the United States, Princeton University Press, Princeton, NJ.
- Thornbury, W. D., 1965, Regional Geomorphology Of The United States, John Wiley & Sons, Inc., New York.
