= Lake Glendive =

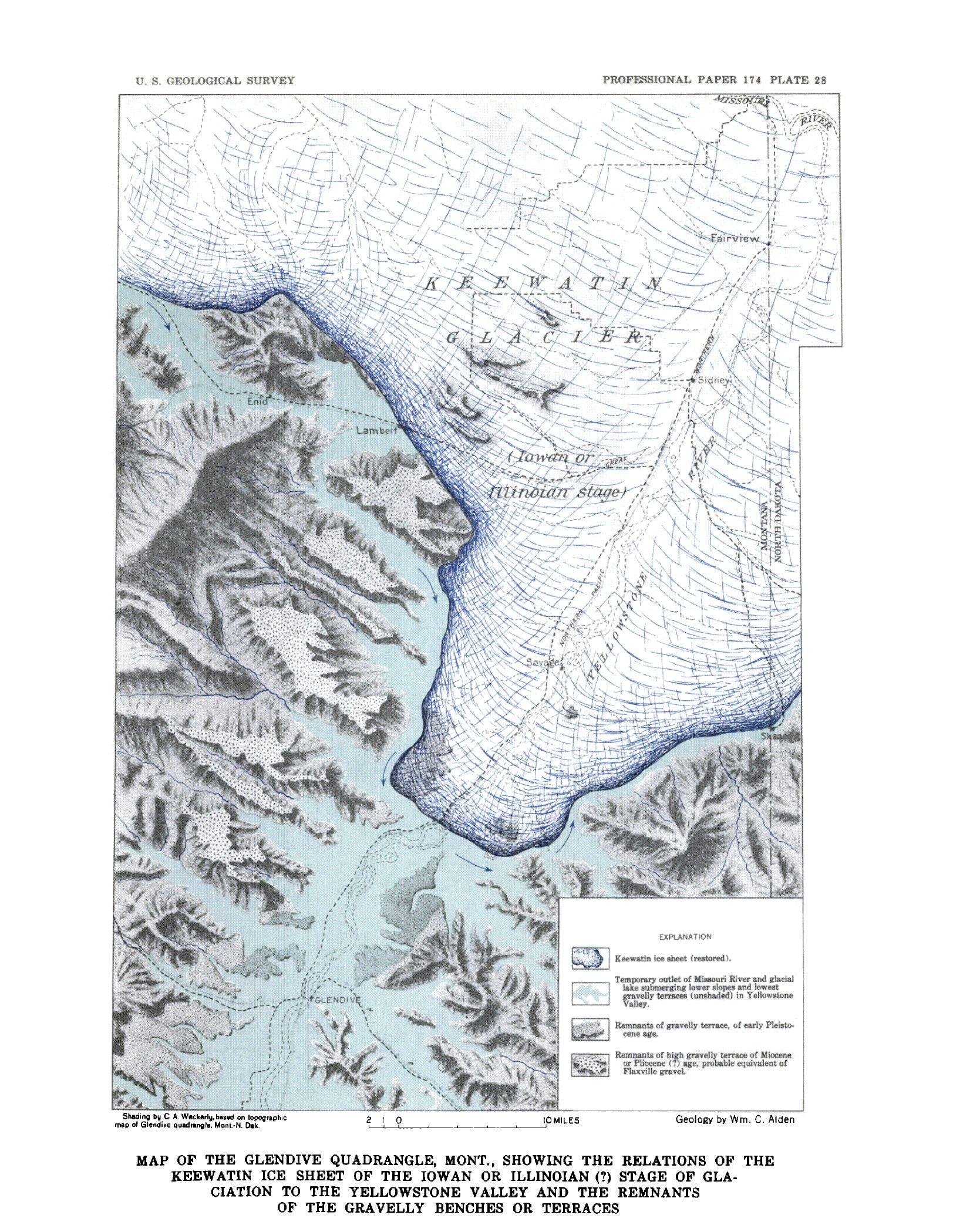
- Map of the Glendive Quadrangle

- Location within Montana
- Location: Dawson and Prairie, Montana
- Coordinates: 47.119933°N 104.711266°W
- Lake type: Glacial lake (former)
- Primary inflows: Laurentide Ice Sheet
- Primary outflows: Over the divide to the Yellowstone River or along the face of the Ice sheet.
- Basin countries: United States
- Max. length: about 80 miles (130 km)
- Max. width: about 30 miles (48 km)
- Surface area: varied
- Surface elevation: 315 m (1,033 ft)

Glacial Lake Glendive was a glacial lake on the lower Yellowstone River. It formed in the valley of Yellowstone, during the late Pleistocene epoch south of the Keewatin Ice Sheet. As the ice sheet retreated northward, the lake drained into the modern Missouri River.

Ice of the Keewatin Lobe of the Laurentide Ice Sheet advanced westward into the Missouri and Yellowstone river valleys. The Glasgow sublobe blocked the Missouri River west of present-day Fort Peck, Montana, and created Lake Jordan and glacial lakes Circle and Lambert were formed to the east. The Yellowstone lobe spread south past Intake, Montana, and formed glacial Lake Glendive. At its maximum the ice may have blocked the Little Missouri River forming glacial Lake Mikkelson. When the ice sheet began to retreat northward, the southwestern margin of abandonment its previous drainages and lakes formed in the depression along the ice margins. Melting of the Shelby and Havre lobes in western Montana led to the retreat of the ice into Alberta. By 16,200 B.C. the ice had created glacial Lake Carmichael in the area of the Cypress Hills. By 15,700 B.C. ice-free conditions may have existed in southwestern Saskatchewan north of Havre, Montana.

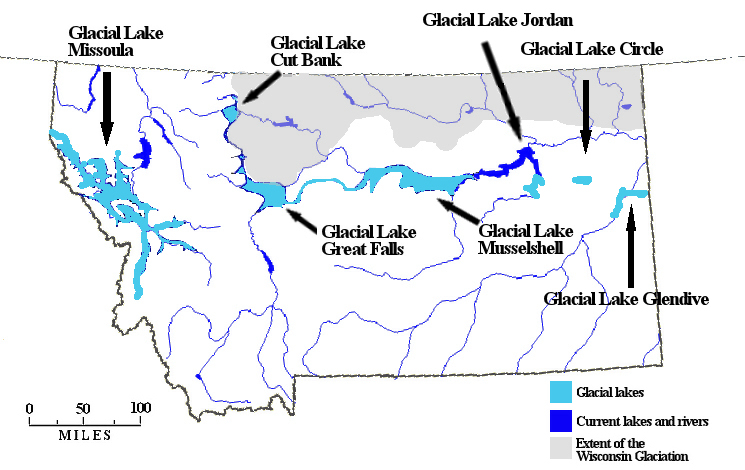
Map of Montana showing Lake Glendive.

== See also ==
- List of prehistoric lakes
- Proglacial lakes of the Missouri River Basin
  - Lake Cut Bank
  - Lake Chouteau
  - Lake Great Falls
  - Lake Musselshell
  - Lake Jordan.
  - Lake Circle
  - Lake Glendive
  - Lake McKenzie
