= Lake Great Falls =

Prehistoric lake in what is now central Montana

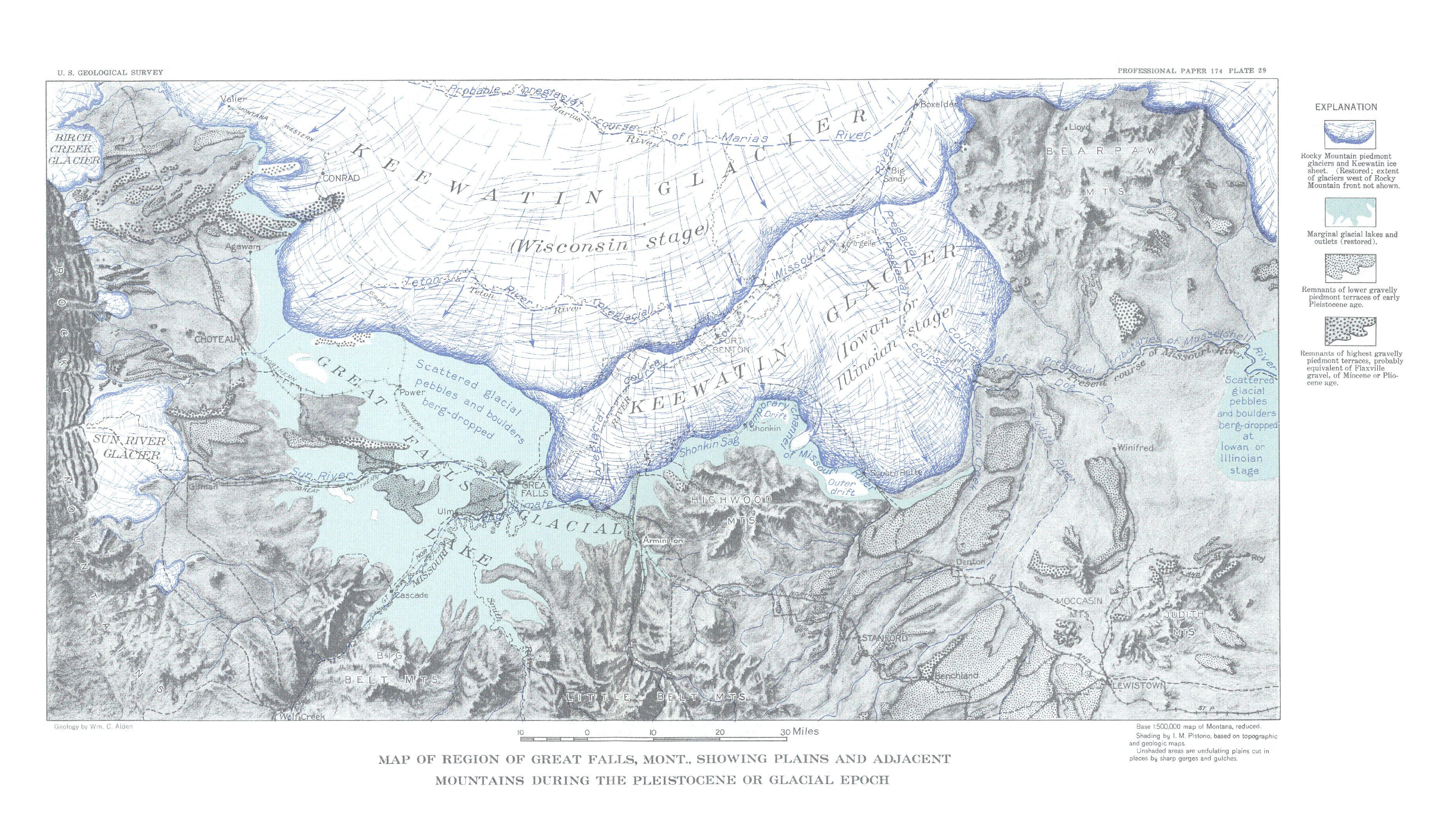
- Glacial Lake Great Falls.

- Location within Montana
- Location: Cascade, Montana
- Coordinates: 47.503784°N 111.286353°W
- Lake type: Glacial lake (former)
- Primary inflows: Laurentide Ice Sheet
- Primary outflows: Along the face of the Ice sheet.
- Basin countries: United States
- Max. length: about 26 miles (42 km)
- Max. width: about 7.8 miles (12.6 km)
- Surface area: varied
- Surface elevation: 3,500 m (11,500 ft)

Lake Great Falls was a prehistoric proglacial lake which existed in what is now central Montana in the United States between 15,000 BCE and 11,000 BCE. Centered on the modern city of Great Falls, Montana, Glacial Lake Great Falls extended as far north as Cut Bank, Montana, and as far south as Holter Lake. At present-day Great Falls, the Glacial Lake Great Falls reached a depth of 600 feet (183 metres).

Approximately 1.5 million years ago, the Missouri River, the Yellowstone River and Musselshell River all flowed northward into a terminal lake. During the last glacial period, the Laurentide and Cordilleran ice sheets pushed these lakes and rivers southward. Between 15,000 BCE and 11,000 BCE, the Laurentide Ice Sheet blocked the Missouri River and created Glacial Lake Great Falls.

About 13,000 BCE, as the glacier retreated, Glacial Lake Great Falls emptied catastrophically in a glacial lake outburst flood. The meltwater poured through the Highwood Mountains and eroded the hundred mile-long, 500-foot-deep (150 m) Shonkin Sag—one of the most famous prehistoric meltwater channels in the world.

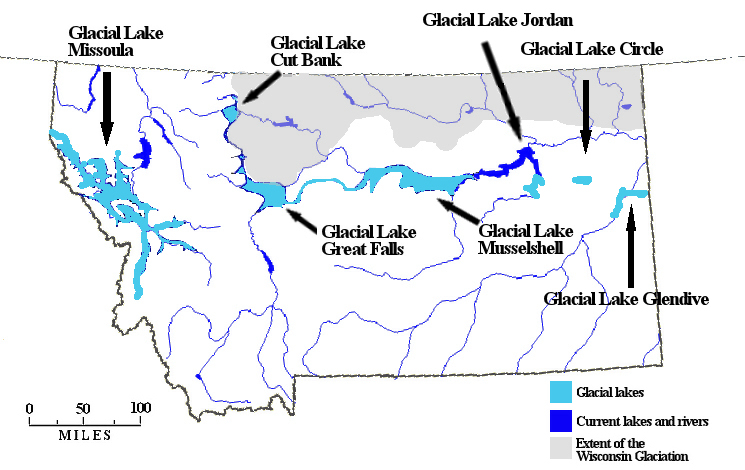
Map of Montana showing glacial lakes.

== Bibliography ==
- Alden, W. C., 1958, Physiography And Glacial Geology Of Eastern Montana And Adjacent Areas, U. S. Geological Survey Professional Paper 174.
- Colton, R. B., Lemke, R. W., and Lindvall, R. M., 1961, Glacial map of Montana East of the Rocky Mountains, U. S. Geological Survey Miscellaneous Geological Investigations Map I-327.
- Lindvall, R. M., 1962, Geology Of The Eagle Buttes Quadrangle, Chouteau County, Montana, U. S. Geological Survey Miscellaneous Geological Investigations Map I-349.
- Thornbury, W. D., 1965, Regional Geomorphology Of The United States, John Wiley & Sons, Inc., New York.

== See also ==
- List of prehistoric lakes
- Proglacial lakes of the Missouri River Basin
  - Lake Cut Bank
  - Lake Chouteau
  - Lake Great Falls
  - Lake Musselshell
  - Lake Jordan.
  - Lake Circle
  - Lake Glendive
  - Lake McKenzie
