= Lake Musselshell =

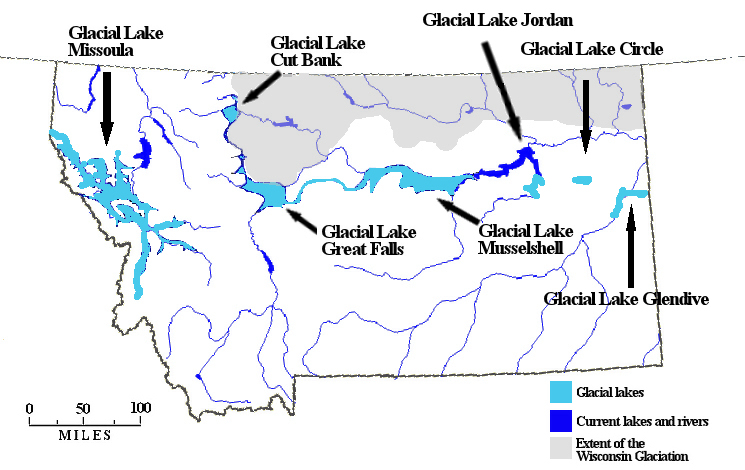
- Map of Montana showing Lake Musselshell.

- Location within Montana
- Location: Petroleum, Phillips and Garfield Counties, Montana
- Coordinates: 47.374722°N 107.943056°W
- Lake type: Glacial lake (former)
- Primary inflows: Laurentide Ice Sheet
- Primary outflows: Over the divide to the Yellowstone River or along the face of the Ice sheet.
- Basin countries: United States
- Max. length: about 140 miles (230 km)
- Max. width: 40 miles (64 km)
- Surface area: varied
- Surface elevation: 315 m (1,033 ft)

The basin that held Pleistocene Lake Musselshell is in the lower (north-flowing) reach of the river. It is underlain mostly by highly erodible Cretaceous Colorado shale, Montana group sandstone, siltstone and shale, and Hell Creek sandstone and shale. The bedrock is gently folded and affected by local faults and joints. There is a sequence of nine terraces and more than 100 glacial boulders. The terraces are older than the erratics as the erratics rest on the terraces.

== Glacial stages ==
Advancing out of Alberta a lobe of the late Wisconsin Laurentide Ice Sheet advanced southeastward into east and central Montana and southwestern Saskatchewan, leaving the Cypress Hills and Boundary Plateau unglaciated. As the Laurentide ice crossed the area of the present day Milk River valley in southern Alberta, it was divided into two lobes by the Sweetgrass Hills, which also remained unglaciated. The western lobe, the Shelby lobe, advanced southward to the Missouri River, in the vicinity of Great Falls, Montana. The lobe that extended east of the Sweetgrass Hills, the Havre lobe, moved in two directions. The Lorna sublobe, advanced across the Missouri River to north of the Highwood Mountains. The Malta sublobe expanded southeastward along the present-day Milk River, bounded to the north by the Boundary Plateau and to the south by the Little Rocky Mountains and the region of the Mussellshell River. The Lake Great Falls provides an approximate date and southern boundary for the maximum advance of the glacial lobes into Montana, impounding the Missouri River, Yellowstone River, and Little Missouri River rivers, each valley forming a glacial lake; i.e., Lake Mussellshell, Lake Circle, Lake Jordan, Lake Lambet, Lake Glendive, and Lake Mikkelson.

== Bibliography ==
- Alden, W. C., 1958, Physiography And Glacial Geology Of Eastern Montana And Adjacent Areas, U. S. Geological Survey Professional Paper 174.
- Colton, R. B., Lemke, R. W., and Lindvall, R. M., 1961, Glacial map of Montana East of the Rocky Mountains, U. S. Geological Survey Miscellaneous Geological Investigations Map I-327.
- Howard, A. D., 1958, Drainage Evolution In Northeastern Montana and Northwestern North Dakota, Bulletin of the Geological Society of America, v69, 575-588.
- Thornbury, W. D., 1965, Regional Geomorphology Of The United States, John Wiley & Sons, Inc., New York.

== See also ==
- List of prehistoric lakes
- Proglacial lakes of the Missouri River Basin
  - Lake Cut Bank
  - Lake Chouteau
  - Lake Great Falls
  - Lake Musselshell
  - Lake Jordan.
  - Lake Circle
  - Lake Glendive
  - Lake McKenzie
