= Lake Jordan =

- Lake Jordan, Alabama
- Lake Jordan (Montana)
- Jordan Lake, North Carolina
