= Lake Jordan (Montana) =

Glacial lake in Montana, USA

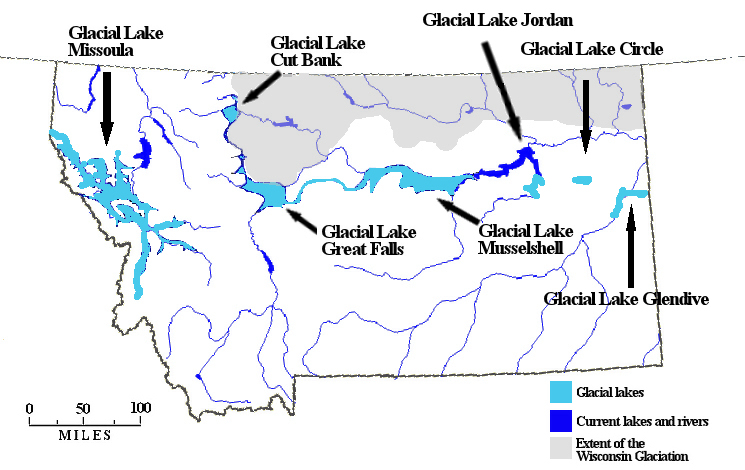
- Map of Montana showing Lake Jordan.

- Location within Montana Location within the United States
- Location: Glacier and Glacier, Montana along the Jordan River (Montana).
- Coordinates: 47.517223°N 106.285833°W
- Lake type: Glacial lake (former)
- Primary inflows: Laurentide Ice Sheet
- Primary outflows: south along the ice front into Glacial Lake Glendive.
- Basin countries: United States
- Max. length: about 70 miles (110 km)
- Max. width: 20 miles (32 km)
- Surface area: varied
- Surface elevation: 2,300 m (7,500 ft)

Lake Jordan was a glacial lake formed during the late Pleistocene along the Jordan River. After the Laurentide Ice Sheet retreated, water melting off the glacier accumulated between the Rocky Mountains and the ice sheet. The lake drained along the front of the ice sheet, eastward towards the Yellowstone River and Glacial Lake Glendive.

From the lake deposits near Great Falls, Montana, the Havre lobe of the Laurentide Ice Sheet dammed the ancestral Missouri River during the late Wisconsin Glacial Period.

== Glacial Event ==
A lobe of the late Wisconsin Laurentide Ice Sheet advanced from central Alberta, southeastward into Montana and southwestern Saskatchewan. It left the Cypress Hills and Boundary Plateau undisturbed. As the glacier crossed the present day Milk River valley in southern Alberta, it was split into two lobes by the Sweetgrass Hills, which became an island in the glacier. The western lobe or Shelby lobe, moved southward to the Missouri River, near Great Falls, Montana. The Havre lobe, east of the Sweetgrass Hills, moved in two directions. The Lorna sublobe, advanced over the Missouri River to north of the Highwood Mountains. The Malta sublobe expanded southeastward along the present-day Milk River, between the Boundary Plateau and the Little Rocky Mountains in the region of the Musselshell River.

== Bibliography ==
- Alden, W. C., 1958, Physiography And Glacial Geology Of Eastern Montana And Adjacent Areas, U. S. Geological Survey Professional Paper 174.
- Colton, R. B., Lemke, R. W., and Lindvall, R. M., 1961, Glacial map of Montana East of the Rocky Mountains, U. S. Geological Survey Miscellaneous Geological Investigations Map I-327.
- Howard, A. D., 1958, Drainage Evolution In Northeastern Montana and Northwestern North Dakota, Bulletin of the Geological Society of America, v69, 575–588.
- Lemke, R. W., Laird, W. M., Tipton, M. J., and Lindvall, R. M., 1965, Quaternary Geology Of Northern Great Plains, in Wright, H. E., Jr., and Frey, D. G., Eds, The Quaternary of the United States, Princeton University Press, Princeton, NJ.
- Lindvall, R. M., 1962, Geology Of The Eagle Buttes Quadrangle, Chouteau County, Montana, U. S. Geological Survey Miscellaneous Geological Investigations Map I-349.
- Thornbury, W. D., 1965, Regional Geomorphology Of The United States, John Wiley & Sons, Inc., New York.
- Trimble, D. E., 1980, The Geologic Story Of The Great Plains, Geological Survey Bulletin 1493.
- Wayne, W. J., Aber, J. S., Agard, S. S., Bergantino, R. N., Bluemle, J. P., Coates, D. A., Cooley, M. E., Madole, R. F., Martin, J. E., Mears, B., Jr., Morrison, R. B., and Sutherland, W. M., 1991, Quaternary Geology Of The Northern Great Plains, in The Geology of North America, Vol K-2, Quaternary Nonglacial Geology: Conterminous U. S., The Geological Society of America.

== See also ==
- List of prehistoric lakes
- Proglacial lakes of the Missouri River Basin
  - Lake Cut Bank
  - Lake Chouteau
  - Lake Great Falls
  - Lake Musselshell
  - Lake Jordan.
  - Lake Circle
  - Lake Glendive
  - Lake McKenzie
