= Lake Cut Bank =

Glacial lake in Glacier, Montana, USA

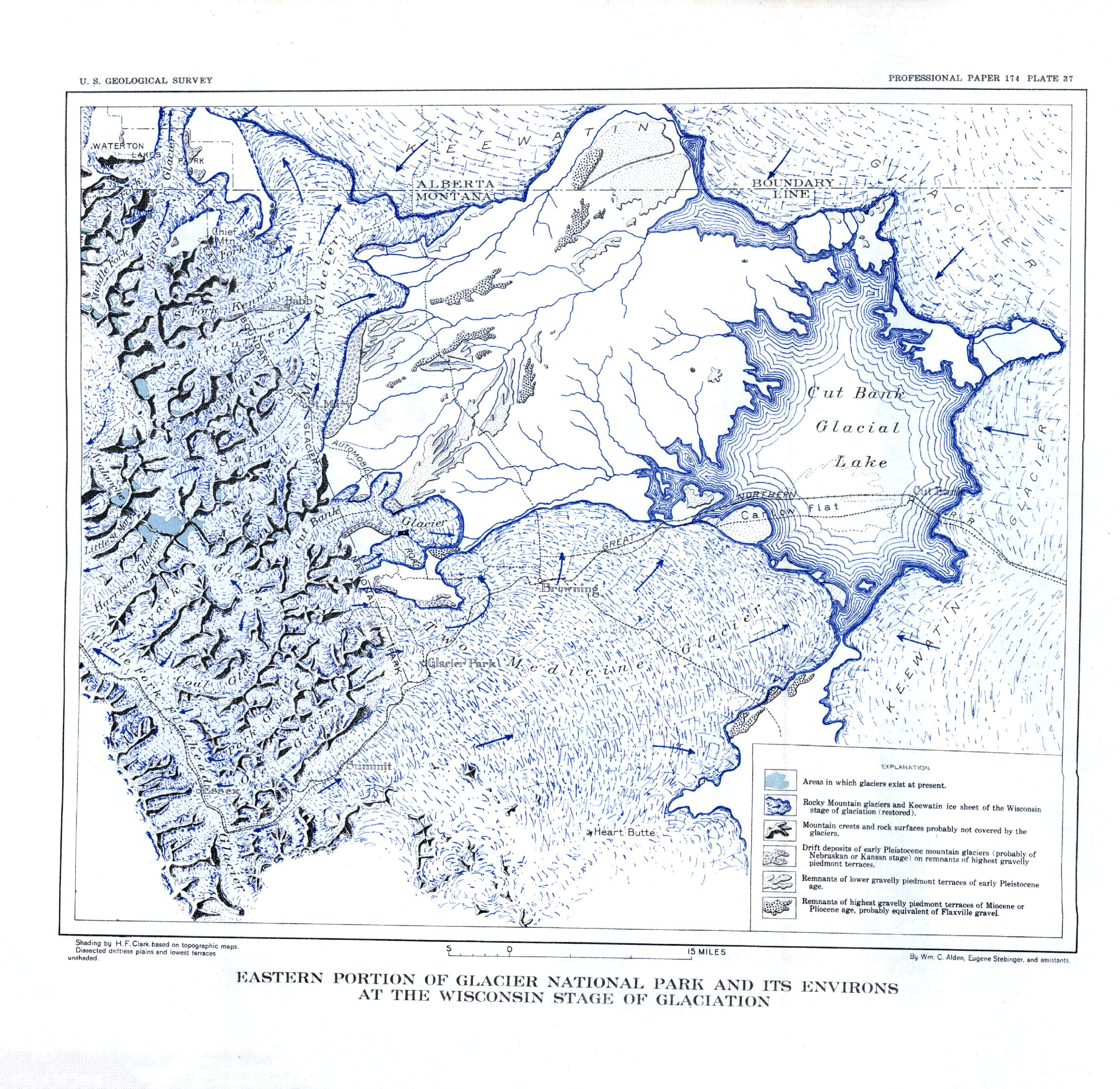
- Glacial Lake Cut Bank, along the eastern edge of Glacier National Park.

- Location within Montana
- Location: Glacier, Montana along the Cut Bank Creek.
- Coordinates: 48.626910°N 112.354234°W
- Lake type: Glacial lake (former)
- Primary inflows: Laurentide Ice Sheet
- Primary outflows: south along the ice front into Glacial Lake Choteau.
- Basin countries: United States
- Max. length: about 70 miles (110 km)
- Max. width: 20 miles (32 km)
- Surface area: varied
- Surface elevation: 3,900 m (12,800 ft)

Lake Cut Bank was a glacial lake formed during the late Pleistocene along the Missouri and Sun Rivers. After the Laurentide Ice Sheet retreated, water melting off the glacier accumulated between the Rocky Mountinas and the ice sheet. The lake drained along the front of the ice sheet, eastward towards the Judith River and the Missouri River.

The front of the Keewatin ice sheet completely blocked the valley of Cut Bank Creek so that for 20 miles (32 km) the ice dam was bordered by the water of an extensive lake, which has been designated glacial Lake Cut Bank. It is defined by the granitic pebbles and boulders on top of the hills southeast of Cut Bank and are present at several places in the basin farther north and west all below 4,000 feet (1,200 m). The pebbles were deposited from icebergs floating on the lake. The lake bottom is identified by the laminated silts over the flatter parts of the basin. The silts are up to 30 feet (9.1 m) as seen in some of the coulees. Additionally, stratified sand and gravel are visible in the basin. There is no defined shoreline. The lake has been mapped below 3,900 feet (1,200 m) contour, with shore like slopes between 3,900 and 4,000 feet (1,200 and 1,200 m). The Carlow Flat shows evidence of being submerged part of the time. About 8 metres (0.0080 km) southwest of Cut Bank the same granite pebbles are found at 4,050 feet (1,230 m). This is taken as the maximum and first lake level. The lake drained southward along the ice front. Later the water fell to 3,900 feet (1,200 m) and flowed through the sag occupied by ponds.

The inner gorge of Cut Bank Creek formed after the glacial lake drained. The lake received runoff from the adjacent land area and from the north front of the Two Medicine Glacier for over 50 miles (80 km) (Squaw Buttes, southwest of Cut Bank, westward to the mountains). Cut Bank Glacier and the South Fork of the Milk River drained into Lake Cut Bank. Water from the St. Mary Glacier and from both the mountain glaciers and the Keewatin ice sheet, north of the international boundary drained into the South Fork of the Milk River and then into glacial Lake Cut Bank. The glacial river channel is not abandoned. It runs form the Milk River northeast of Landslide Butte to the head of Rocky Coulee. By assuming that each layer of the laminated clay deposited in this lake is a varve, representing one season's deposition, the longevity of the lake could be counted.

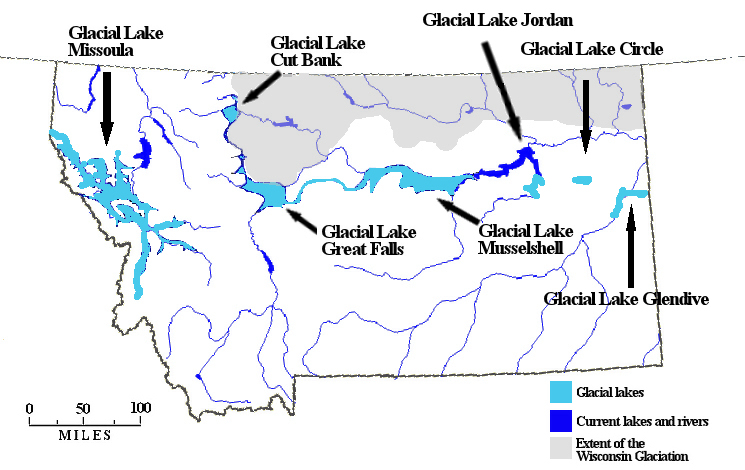
Map of Montana showing Glacial Lake Cut Bank.

== See also ==
- List of prehistoric lakes
- Proglacial lakes of the Missouri River Basin
  - Lake Cut Bank
  - Lake Chouteau
  - Lake Great Falls
  - Lake Musselshell
  - Lake Jordan.
  - Lake Circle
  - Lake Glendive
  - Lake McKenzie
