= Elkwater Lake (Alberta) =

Lake in Alberta

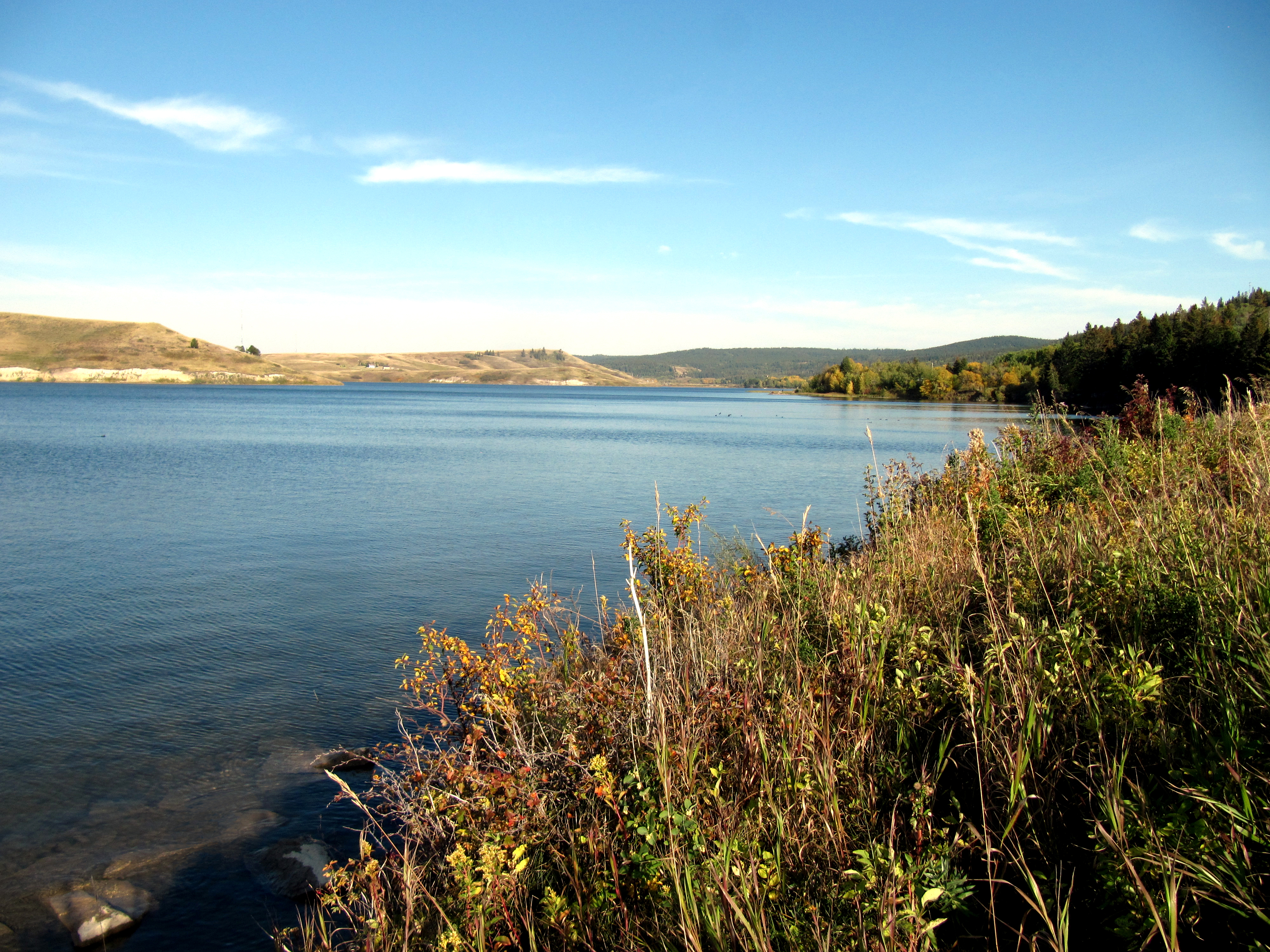
- Elkwater Lake, Alberta

- Location within Alberta
- Location: Cypress County, Alberta
- Coordinates: 49°40′04″N 110°17′42″W
- Type: mesotrophic
- Catchment area: 25.7 km^{2} (9.9 sq mi)
- Basin countries: Canada
- Surface area: 2.31 km^{2} (0.89 sq mi)
- Max. depth: 8.4 m (28 ft)
- Settlements: Elkwater

Elkwater Lake is a small lake located in the northwest corner of the Cypress Hills Interprovincial Park in southeastern Alberta, Canada. It is reached via Alberta Highway 41 (Buffalo Trail), and the tourist community of Elkwater lies on its southern shore. Its name is a translation of Ponokiokwe, the Blackfoot name for the lake.

Elkwater Lake has a surface area of 2.31 km^{2} (0.89 sq mi) and a maximum depth of 8.4 m (28 ft). It lies in the hydrographic basin of the South Saskatchewan River and has a drainage area of 25.7 km^{2} (9.9 sq mi). It is a mesotrophic lake, and it hosts a fishery for Yellow Perch and Northern Pike.

Geologically, Elkwater Lake sits in a glacial meltwater valley that was carved during the retreat of the Laurentide Ice Sheet from the area at the end of the Pleistocene Epoch.

== See also ==
- Lakes of Alberta
- Cypress Hills
