= Glacial Lake McKenzie =

Lake McKenzie
- Location within North Dakota
- Location: McLean, Mercer, and Dunn, Counties, North Dakota
- Coordinates: 47.528614°N 101.406182°W
- Lake type: Glacial lake (former)
- Primary inflows: Laurentide Ice Sheet
- Primary outflows: Over the divide to the Yellowstone River or along the face of the Ice sheet.
- Basin countries: United States
- Max. length: about 140 miles (230 km)
- Max. width: 40 miles (64 km)
- Surface area: varied
- Surface elevation: 1,940 m (6,360 ft)

Before the Pleistocene Ice Age, circa two million years before present (YBP), the rivers in North, South Dakota and eastern Montana drained northeast into Canada and then into Hudson Bay. The Keewatin Lobe of the continental ice sheet, block the flow of water northward and impounded it along the ice front. Lakes formed, until the waters could find a new way to drain. Initially, the north flowing rivers followed the front of the glacier eastward and into a valley that passed between Garrison and Riverdale, to the Turtle Lake area, and on into Sheridan County. This is known as the preglacial McClean River. This valley became blocked by the glacier and the glacial lake identified as Lake McKenzie formed. Eventually, water level rose to crest the south ridge a point near Riverdale — at the site of the modern Garrison Dam and a diversion trench was cut. The modern Missouri River follows this pathway.

== See also ==
- List of prehistoric lakes
- Proglacial lakes of the Missouri River Basin
  - Lake Cut Bank
  - Lake Chouteau
  - Lake Great Falls
  - Lake Musselshell
  - Lake Jordan.
  - Lake Circle
  - Lake Glendive
  - Lake McKenzie

== Bibliography ==
- Alden, W. C., 1958, Physiography And Glacial Geology Of Eastern Montana And Adjacent Areas, U. S. Geological Survey Professional Paper 174.
- Colton, R. B., Lemke, R. W., and Lindvall, R. M., 1961, Glacial map of Montana East of the Rocky Mountains, U. S. Geological Survey Miscellaneous Geological Investigations Map I-327.
- Howard, A. D., 1958, Drainage Evolution In Northeastern Montana and Northwestern North Dakota, Bulletin of the Geological Society of America, v69, 575-588.
- Lemke, R. W., Laird, W. M., Tipton, M. J., and Lindvall, R. M., 1965, Quaternary Geology Of Northern Great Plains, in Wright, H. E., Jr., and Frey, D. G., Eds, The Quaternary of the United States, Princeton University Press, Princeton, NJ.
- Lindvall, R. M., 1962, Geology Of The Eagle Buttes Quadrangle, Chouteau County, Montana, U. S. Geological Survey Miscellaneous Geological Investigations Map I-349.
- Thornbury, W. D., 1965, Regional Geomorphology Of The United States, John Wiley & Sons, Inc., New York.
- Trimble, D. E., 1980, The Geologic Story Of The Great Plains, Geological Survey Bulletin 1493.
- Wayne, W. J., Aber, J. S., Agard, S. S., Bergantino, R. N., Bluemle, J. P., Coates, D. A., Cooley, M. E., Madole, R. F., Martin, J. E., Mears, B., Jr., Morrison, R. B., and Sutherland, W. M., 1991, Quaternary Geology Of The Northern Great Plains, in The Geology of North America, Vol K-2, Quaternary Nonglacial Geology: Conterminous U. S., The Geological Society of America.
