= Ontario Island =

Former glacial landform in Ontario

Ontario Island was a glacial feature as lobes of the Laurentide Glaciation receded from southern Ontario. The glaciation started to retreat approximately 20,000 years ago. As it retreated its southern edge was ringed by a series of proglacial lakes. The relatively high ground, west of the Niagara Escarpment formed a large island in these lakes.
