= Elkwater, Alberta =

Elkwater
- Unincorporated community
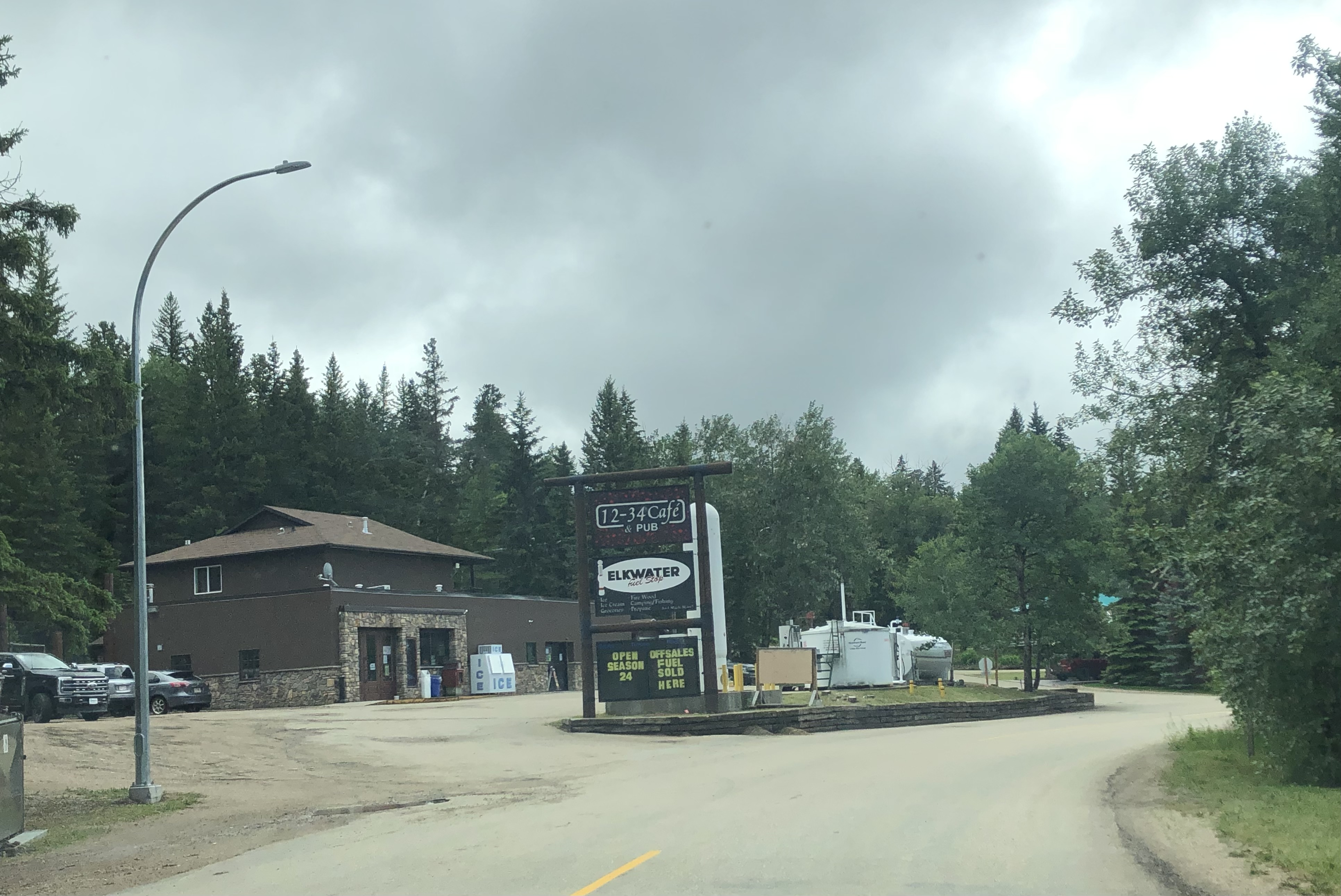
- Entrance to Elkwater

- Location within Alberta
- Coordinates: 49°39′39″N 110°16′54″W
- Country: Canada
- Province: Alberta
- Region: Southern Alberta
- Census division: 1
- Municipal district: Cypress County

Area (2021)
  - Land: 0.68 km^{2} (0.26 sq mi)
- Elevation: 1,234 m (4,049 ft)

Population (2021)
  - Total: 83
  - Density: 122.2/km^{2} (316/sq mi)
- Time zone: UTC−06:00 (Alberta Time)
- Highway: Highway 41
- Waterway: Elkwater Lake

Elkwater is an unincorporated community at the western edge of the Cypress Hills in southeastern Alberta, Canada, 65 kilometres (40 mi) southeast of Medicine Hat. The main access route is via Alberta Highway 41 (Buffalo Trail), which leads south from the Trans-Canada Highway (Alberta Highway 1).

The former hamlet is located within Cypress Hills Interprovincial Park on the southern shore of Elkwater Lake and consists mostly of a collection of cabins. Its name is a translation of Ponokiokwe, the Blackfoot name for the lake.

== Flora and fauna ==
The Elkwater townsite lies at an elevation of about 1,225 m (4,025 ft) on the northwest slope of the Cypress Hills which, with a summit at 1,466 m (4810 ft), are the highest point between the Rocky Mountains and Labrador within Canada. Because of the elevation, the area receives more moisture than the surrounding plains. Forests of lodgepole pine, white spruce, and aspen cover the north-facing slopes above the town. Large animals include mule deer, white-tailed deer, coyote, elk, cougar, and moose, and many types of birds. Moose and wild turkeys were introduced to the area and are not native. A large lake contains northern pike and yellow perch. Nearby lakes such as Reesor Lake also have fishing available. Sport fishing licenses are available online or can be acquired from the Elkwater Visitor Centre.

== Demographics ==
In the 2021 Census of Population conducted by Statistics Canada, Elkwater had a population of 83 living in 48 of its 228 total private dwellings, a change of −1.2% from its 2016 population of 84. With a land area of 0.68 km^{2} (0.26 sq mi), it had a population density of 122.1/km^{2} (316.1/sq mi) in 2021.

As a designated place in the 2016 Census of Population conducted by Statistics Canada, Elkwater had a population of 84 living in 40 of its 260 total private dwellings, a change of 68% from its 2011 population of 50. With a land area of 2.83 km^{2} (1.09 sq mi), it had a population density of 29.7/km^{2} (76.9/sq mi) in 2016.

== Administration ==
Since the Elkwater townsite is in a provincial park, it is administered by the provincial government. Residents can never own the land on which their cottages or homes are built, and leases must be negotiated with the provincial government.

== Accommodation ==
Elkwater has one hotel, the Elkwater Lake Lodge & Resort, which features condos, cabins, and suites.

There are seven campgrounds near the townsite with approximately 450 campsites. They are:

- Elkwater (main)
- Lakeview
- Old Baldy
- Beaver Creek
- Ferguson Hill
- Lodgepole
- Firerock

To the east of Elkwater, camping can be found at Spruce Coulee and Reesor Lake. Closer to the Saskatchewan border is Battle Creek campground. Four group camp sites are also available to rent.

Elkwater has bed-and-breakfast and other accommodations at the Bar-Zee Bed & Breakfast, located north of the park.

== Other services and facilities ==
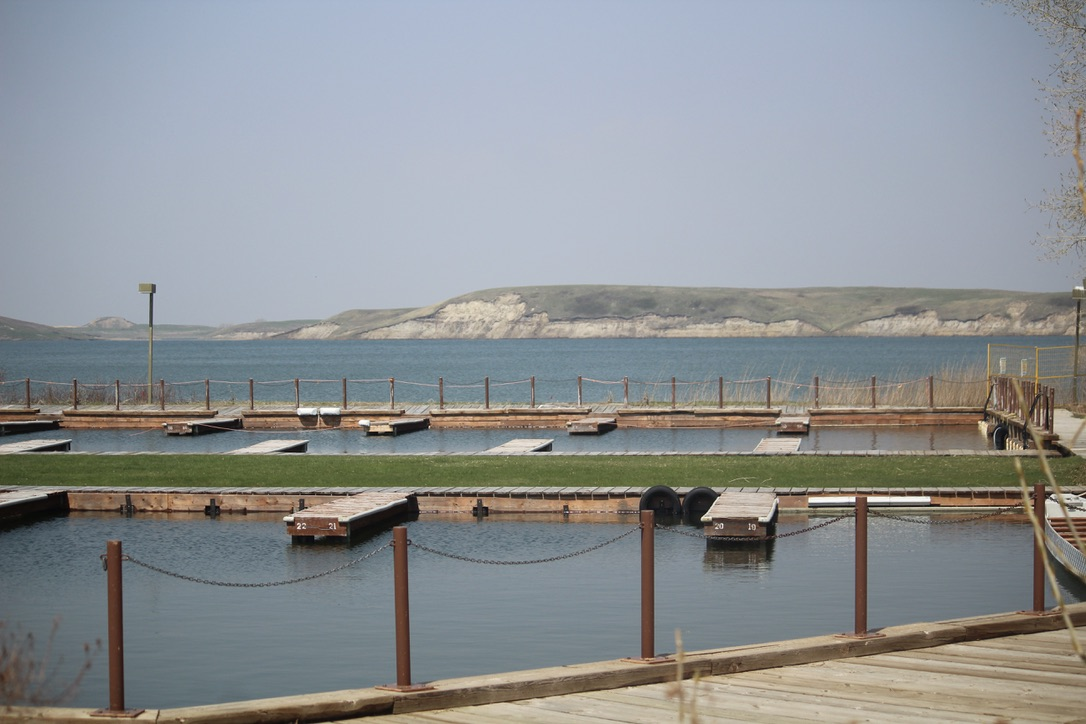
Marina on Elkwater Lake

Services and facilities include a convenience store, gas station, cafe, restaurant, visitor centre, ski hill, nine-hole golf course, pump track, skating rink, mini putt, and a marina. Park administration offices for the Alberta section of the park are also located here.

== Climate ==
Elkwater experiences a subarctic climate (Köppen climate classification Dfc) that falls just short of the boundary with the humid continental climate zone (Köppen Dfb). Winters are long and cold, while summers are short and warm. Precipitation is moderate, with an annual average of 529mm.

Climate data for Elkwater
Month	Jan	Feb	Mar	Apr	May	Jun	Jul	Aug	Sep	Oct	Nov	Dec	Year
Record high °C (°F)	5.7 (42.3)	8.6 (47.5)	16.1 (61.0)	19.2 (66.6)	28 (82)	30 (86)	31.9 (89.4)	31 (88)	30.1 (86.2)	20.6 (69.1)	17.5 (63.5)	13.1 (55.6)	31.9 (89.4)
Mean daily maximum °C (°F)	−4.5 (23.9)	−0.7 (30.7)	2.5 (36.5)	7.7 (45.9)	13.3 (55.9)	16.9 (62.4)	20 (68)	19.9 (67.8)	15.1 (59.2)	10 (50)	1.3 (34.3)	−2 (28)	8.3 (46.9)
Daily mean °C (°F)	−9 (16)	−4.5 (23.9)	−1.8 (28.8)	2.6 (36.7)	8.1 (46.6)	11.7 (53.1)	14.7 (58.5)	14.4 (57.9)	9.8 (49.6)	5.1 (41.2)	−2.1 (28.2)	−6.1 (21.0)	3.6 (38.5)
Mean daily minimum °C (°F)	−13.5 (7.7)	−8.2 (17.2)	−6.1 (21.0)	−2.6 (27.3)	3 (37)	6.4 (43.5)	9.4 (48.9)	8.8 (47.8)	4.6 (40.3)	0.1 (32.2)	−5.5 (22.1)	−10.1 (13.8)	−1.1 (29.9)
Record low °C (°F)	−26.9 (−16.4)	−20.8 (−5.4)	−18.8 (−1.8)	−14.7 (5.5)	−9 (16)	−5 (23)	−1 (30)	−4 (25)	−10 (14)	−11.9 (10.6)	−16.4 (2.5)	−32.1 (−25.8)	−32.1 (−25.8)
Average precipitation mm (inches)	33 (1.3)	6 (0.2)	23 (0.9)	44 (1.7)	81 (3.2)	110 (4.3)	70 (2.8)	52 (2.0)	32 (1.3)	18 (0.7)	21 (0.8)	40 (1.6)	529 (20.8)
Source: The Weather Network

== See also ==
- List of communities in Alberta
- List of designated places in Alberta
