= Cordilleran ice sheet =

Major ice sheet

Cordilleran Ice Sheet
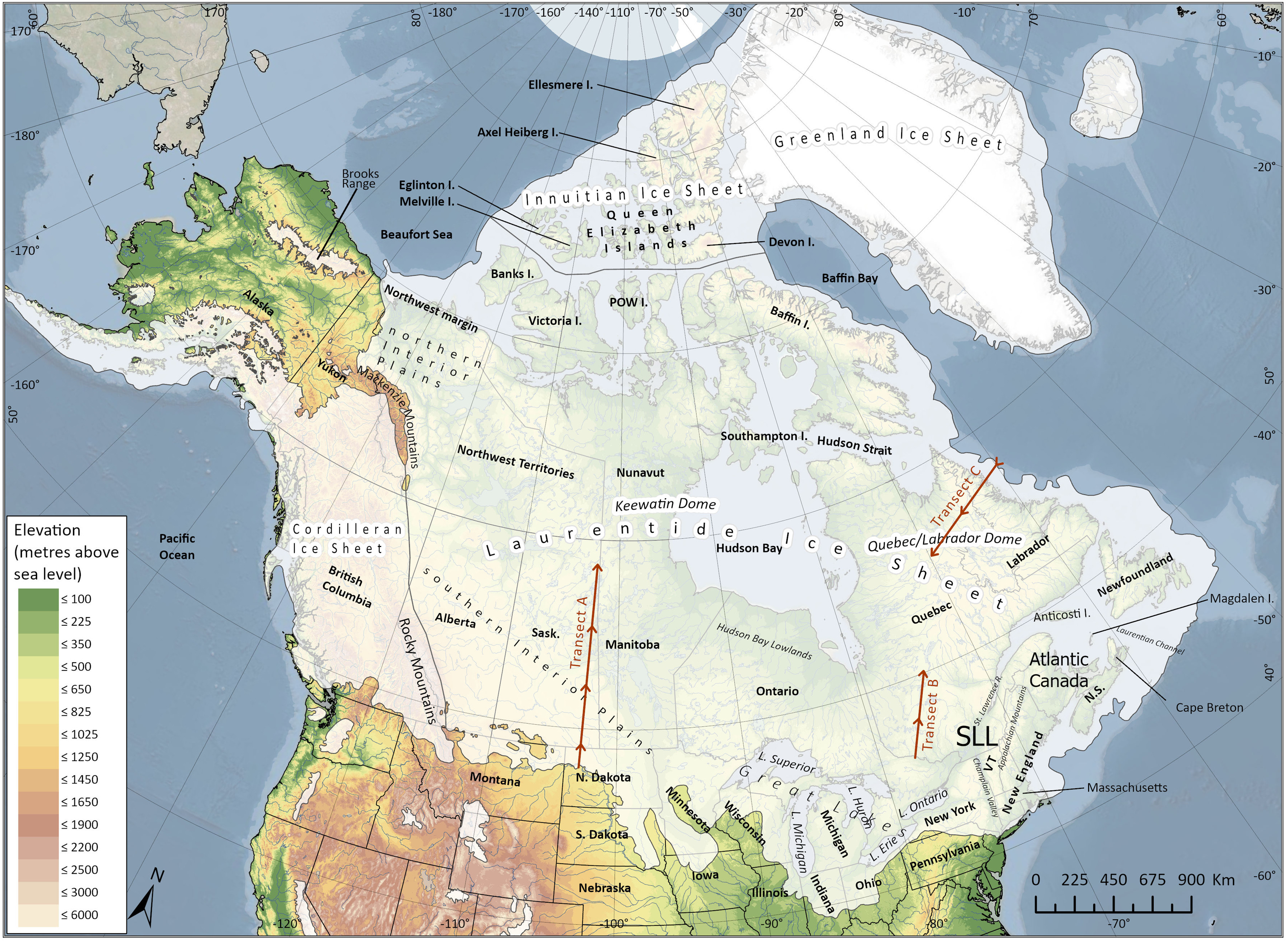
- Map of North America during the Last Glacial Maximum, showing Cordilleran ice sheet (left) at maximum extent
- Type: continental
- Location: North American Cordillera
- Area: 1,500,000 km2
- Width: 900 km
- Lowest elevation: Sea level
- Terminus: West – Pacific Ocean; East – Great Plains; South – 40 degrees north latitude
- Status: Retreated

The Cordilleran ice sheet was a major ice sheet that periodically covered large parts of North America during glacial periods over the last ~2.6 million years.

== Extent ==
The ice extent covered almost all of the continental shelf north of the Strait of Juan de Fuca and south from approximately the southwestern third of the Yukon Territory. This included all of mainland British Columbia, South Central Alaska, the Alaska Panhandle, and peninsula. The southern glacial maximums extended south to Washington state near Olympia in the west and to Spokane, the Idaho Panhandle, and much of Western Montana at the eastern glacial edge. At its eastern end the Cordilleran ice sheet merged with the Laurentide Ice Sheet at the Continental Divide, forming an area of ice that contained one and a half times as much water as the Antarctic ice sheet does today. The ice sheet faded north of the Alaska Range because the climate was too dry to form glaciers.

The ice sheet covered up to 1,500,000 km^{2} (580,000 sq mi) at the Last Glacial Maximum and probably more than that in some previous periods, when it may have extended into the northeast extremity of Oregon and the Salmon River Mountains in Idaho.

== Refugia ==
At its western end it is currently understood that several small glacial refugia existed during the last glacial maximum below present sea level in the now-submerged Hecate Strait and on the Brooks Peninsula in northern Vancouver Island. However, evidence of ice-free refugia above present sea level north of the Olympic Peninsula has been refuted by genetic and geological studies since the middle 1990s.

== Thawing ==
Unlike the Laurentide Ice Sheet, which may have taken as many as eleven thousand years to fully melt, the Cordilleran ice sheet melted very quickly, probably in four thousand years or less. This rapid melting caused floods such as the overflow of Lake Missoula and shaped the topography of the fertile Inland Empire of Eastern Washington. Further north, the Cordilleran is responsible for a large number of glacial landforms scattered across the west of Canada. The rate of thawing has also played a significant role in research surrounding early human migration into the American continents.

The rapid retreat of the Cordilleran ice sheet is a focus of study by glaciologists seeking to understand the difference in patterns of melting in marine-terminating glaciers, glaciers whose margin extends into open water without seafloor contact, and land-terminating glaciers, with a land or seafloor margin, as scientists believe the western marine-terminating margin retreated much faster than its southern, land-terminating front. This rapid retreat resulted in noticeably fewer glacial landforms in the west of the Cordilleran's maximum extent compared to the south and east, though the exact mechanisms behind this disparity are unknown. Some glacial landforms are still present though: the well-characterized landscape of coastal Washington State contains glacial troughs, some glacial lakes, and an extensive outwash plain. Many of the southern and eastern landforms fall near the northern reaches of the American Cordillera, the mountain ranges which geologists believe to be the region from which the Cordilleran first grew, and, after its sudden retreat and ultimate collapse, where it terminated.

The timing of the retreat of the Cordilleran bears significance not just to glaciologists, but to anthropologists interested in the migration of early humans into the Americas. In particular, the collapse of the western front of the Cordilleran ice sheet has been proposed as one route through which early humans could have migrated after crossing the Beringian Land Bridge during the Last Glacial Maximum. This serves as an alternative to the Ice Free Corridor previously posited to have allowed for migration amid the retreat of the eastern front of the Cordilleran ice sheet and the western front of the Laurentide ice sheet. The Ice Free Corridor is a subject of debate among anthropologists in recent years. Recent studies have provoked skepticism, with areas of discussion including the lack of evidence of sufficient flora in the area to support megafaunal migration, to radiometric dating placing the emergence of a corridor through the central Canadian Shield too late to account for the earliest known human sites south of the glaciers.

== See also ==
- Laurentide ice sheet
- Innuitian ice sheet
