= 185P/Petriew =

Jupiter-family comet

Discovery
- Discovered by: Vance Avery Petriew
- Discovery site: Cypress Hills, Canada
- Discovery date: 18 August 2001

Designations
- MPC designation: P/2001 Q2, P/2007 A3

Orbital characteristics
- Epoch: 21 November 2025 (JD 2461000.5)
- Observation arc: 22.65 years (Note: Observation arc from the Minor Planet Center database covering dates from 12 June 2001 until 6 February 2024.)
- Earliest precovery date: 12 June 2001
- Number of observations: 1,272
- Aphelion: 5.268 AU
- Perihelion: 0.932 AU
- Semi-major axis: 3.100 AU
- Eccentricity: 0.69926
- Orbital period: 5.458 years
- Inclination: 14.006°
- Longitude of ascending node: 214.12°
- Argument of periapsis: 181.92°
- Mean anomaly: 155.71°
- Last perihelion: 12 July 2023
- Next perihelion: 26 December 2028
- T_{Jupiter}: 2.750
- Earth MOID: 0.061 AU
- Jupiter MOID: 0.178 AU

Physical characteristics
- Mean radius: <5.7 km (3.5 mi)
- Comet total magnitude (M1): 13.6
- Comet nuclear magnitude (M2): 16.7

185P/Petriew is a Jupiter-family comet with a 5.46-year orbit around the Sun. It was discovered by amateur astronomer Vance Avery Petriew on 18 August 2001.

== Observational history ==
Vance Avery Petriew discovered the comet visually with a 0.51-m reflector telescope during a star party in Cypress Hills, Canada, on 18 August 2001, while he was searching for the Crab Nebula. Petriew initially mistook the object as an unidentified galaxy, until Richard Huziak recognized it as a comet. He became the third Canadian amateur astronomer to discover a comet. Petriew estimated that the comet had an apparent magnitude of 11, a coma about three arcminutes across and no tail. For his discovery, V. A. Petriew was awarded the Edgar Wilson Award in 2002. The comet was also observed by other participants of the party. Alan Hale imaged the comet with a CCD on 19 August and estimated the comet had an apparent magnitude of about 13.

The comet continued to brighten during August, reaching magnitude 9.5. The coma diameter was reported to be 2 to 4 arcminutes. No tail was observed visually, but CCD imaging revealed the presence of a narrow tail. The comet was observed spectographically in September 2001 and was found to have normal production rates of diatomic carbon and water for a Halley-type comet. The comet was quickly found to be periodic, with a period of about 5.5 years. The comet had approached Jupiter to a distance of 0.146 AU (21.8 million km) on 3 July 1982, and as a result its perihelion distance was decreased from 1.37 AU to 1.00 AU.

The comet was recovered on 11 January 2007 by F. Fratev, E. Mihaylova, and A. Kirchev using a 0.25m reflector telescope at Zvezdno Obshtestvo Observatory in Plana, Bulgaria. The comet then had an apparent magnitude of 16.1 and a diffuse coma 0.2 arcminutes across. After recovery, the comet was given the number 185P.

== Meteor showers ==
185P/Petriew could be the parent body of a meteor shower that was first observed on 26–27 October 2024 with a radiant in Lyra.

== Notes ==
Numbered comets
Previous; 184P/Lovas	185P/Petriew	Next; 186P/Garradd
