= Lake Chouteau =

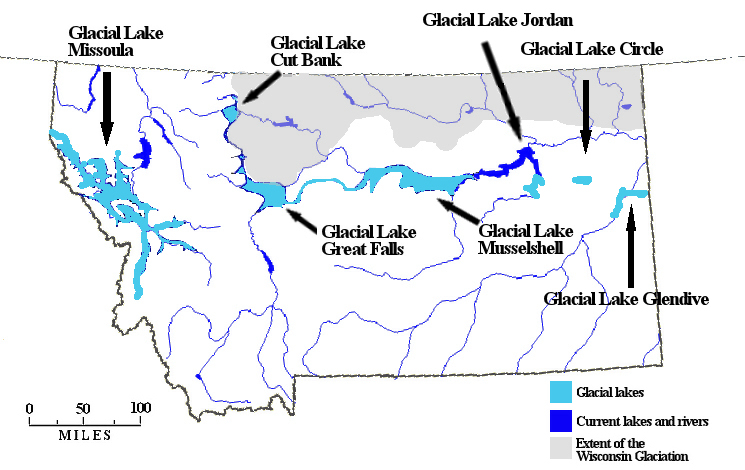
- Map of Montana showing Lake Chouteau.

- Location within Montana
- Location: Teton, Montana
- Coordinates: 47.812155°N 112.183268°W
- Lake type: Glacial lake (former)
- Primary inflows: Laurentide Ice Sheet
- Primary outflows: Lake Great Falls
- Basin countries: United States
- Max. length: about 20 miles (32 km)
- Max. width: about 5 miles (8.0 km)
- Surface area: varied
- Surface elevation: 3,500 m (11,500 ft)

Lake Chouteau was a glacial lake formed during the late Pleistocene along the Teton River. After the Laurentide Ice Sheet retreated, water melting off the glacier accumulated between the Rocky Mountains and the ice sheet. The lake drained along the front of the ice sheet, eastward towards the Judith River and the Missouri River.

The maximum advance of the Laurentide Ice Sheet blocked the drainages of north- and east-flowing rivers, forming glacial lakes along the margin of the ice. On the western Montana plains the Shelby lobe blocked the [Milk River, creating glacial Lake Twin River. Tributaries of the Marias River were also blocked by the Shelby lobe, leading to the formation of glacial lakes Cutbank and Choteau. The Loma sublobe blocked the Missouri north of the Highwood Mountains, forming glacial Lake Great Falls. A lake also formed in the Musselshell River basin.

== Identification ==
Scattered limestone boulders and cobbles sitting on bedrock with in the Teton River basin, east of the river outlet from the piedmont glacial lobe and west of Choteau is evidence of several pre-Pinedale piedmont glaciations. The clasts made up of boulders and cobbles from the limestone-rich, mountain-source and is a nonglacial alluvium of Tertiary age that formerly covered the bedrock surfaces. Paleosols identified as part of the Bull Lake till units or outwash units are weakly developed. They represent two stades of a single glaciation. They are dated from the early Bull Lake lateral moraines in the Glacier National Park at approximately 160 thousand years before present (YBP), the late Bull Lake lateral moraines are approximately 140 thousand YBP.

== See also ==
- List of prehistoric lakes
- Proglacial lakes of the Missouri River Basin
  - Lake Cut Bank
  - Lake Chouteau
  - Lake Great Falls
  - Lake Musselshell
  - Lake Jordan
  - Lake Glendive
  - Lake McKenzie
