= Barnes Ice Cap =

Ice cap in Nunavut, Canada

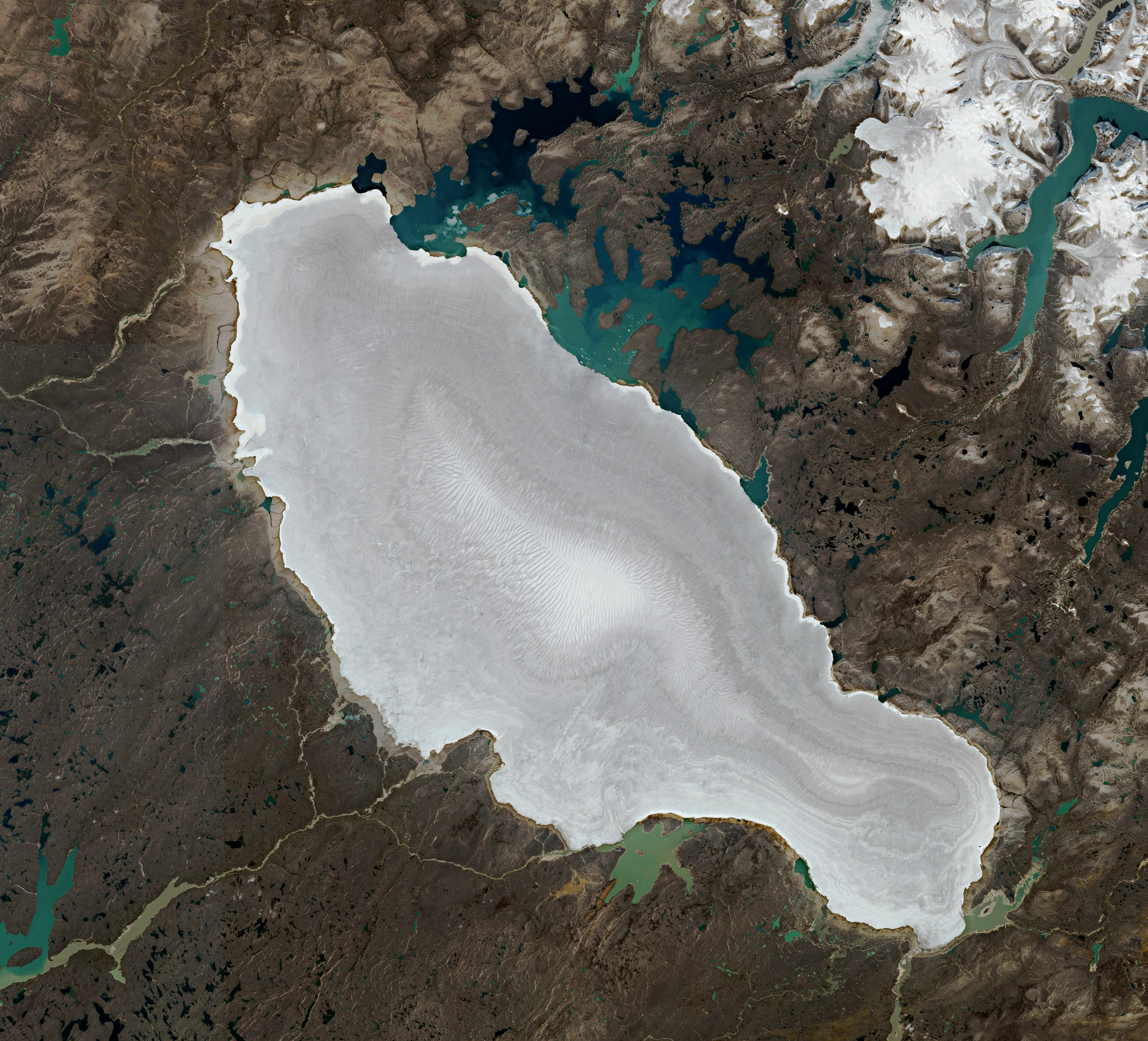
- Sentinel-2 image (2019)

- Location within Nunavut
- Type: Ice cap
- Location: Baffin Island
- Coordinates: 70°00′N 73°30′W

The Barnes Ice Cap is an ice cap located in central Baffin Island, Nunavut, Canada.

== Geography ==
It covers close to 6,000 square kilometres (2,300 square miles) in the area of the Baffin Mountains. It has been thinning due to regional warming. Between 2004 and 2006, the ice cap was thinning at a rate of 1 metre (3 feet 3 inches) per year.

The ice cap contains Canada's oldest ice, some of it being over 20,000 years old. It is a remnant of the Laurentide ice sheet, which covered most of Canada during the last glacial period of the Earth's current ice age. Generator Lake is located at the southeastern end of the ice cap.

== Exploration ==
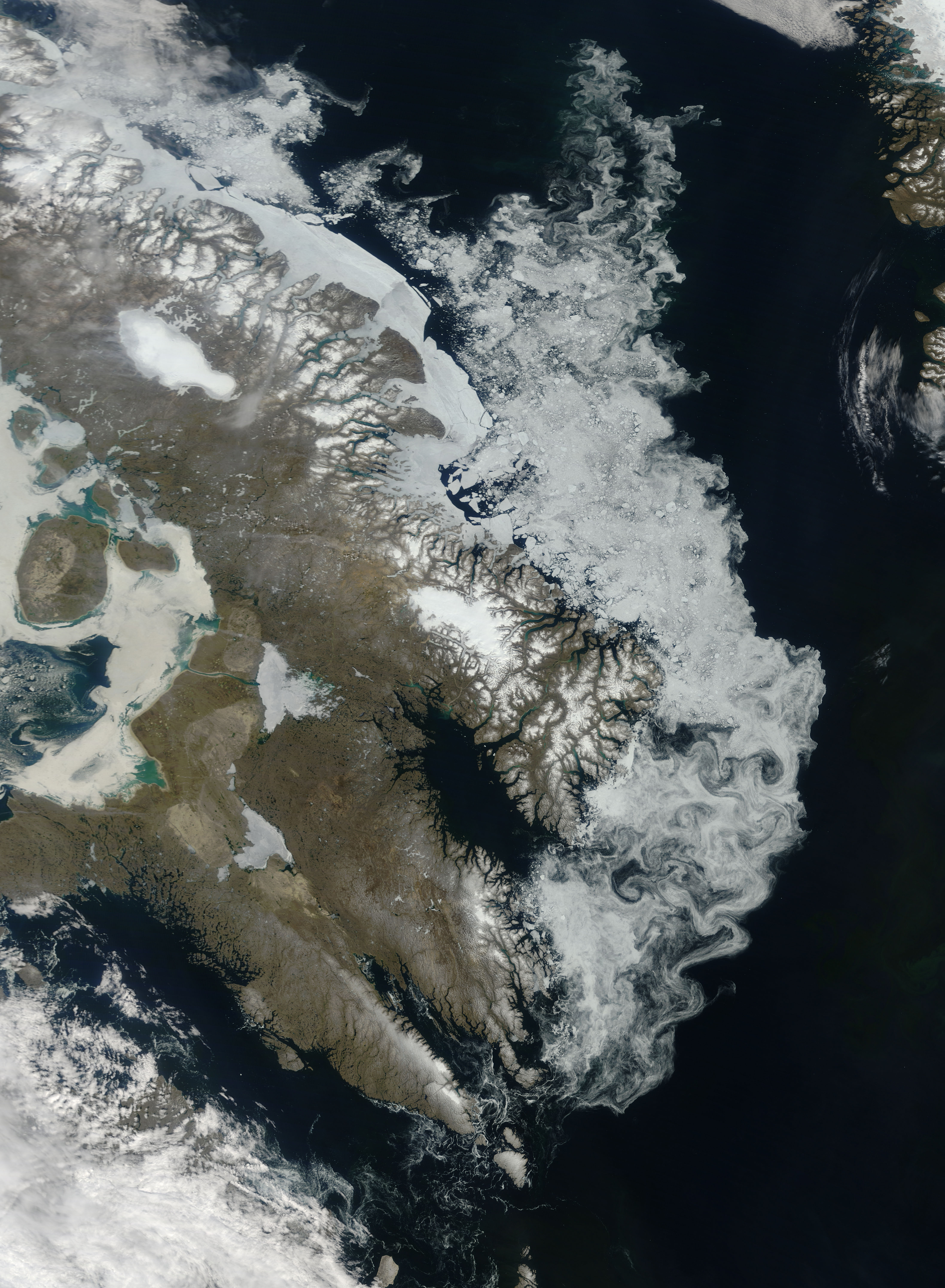
The Barnes Ice Cap on Baffin Island

A team from Laramie, Wyoming, United States, made the first bicycle traverse of the Barnes Ice Cap in 1995. The team was sponsored by the Wyoming Alpine Club and included brothers Mike and Dan Moe — some of the first people to complete the Continental Divide mountain biking route from Canada to Mexico — along with Sharon Kava and Brad Humphrey.

After crossing the ice cap, the team abandoned their bikes and sleds at 70°31′43″N 73°18′42″W on August 22, 1995, to expedite their travel over boulder fields to Baffin Bay. They intended for the bikes to be picked up later. All members of the 1995 party died of hypothermia after an aluminum boat captained by Inuk guide Jushua Ilauq of Clyde River, Nunavut was capsized by a breaching bowhead whale. Ilauq alone survived due to wearing a cold-weather survival suit, and lived until 2025.

In 2009. geologist Kurt Refsnider stumbled upon the bikes by chance. The story of the expedition was chronicled by a childhood friend of Mike Moe, writer Mark Jenkins in Outside magazine in 2006 and 2022.

== See also ==
- List of glaciers
