= Loch Leven, Saskatchewan =

Community in Saskatchewan, Canada

Coordinates: 49.504°N 107.215°W

Location of Loch Leven in Saskatchewan

Loch Leven is a community in the Canadian province of Saskatchewan. It is located in the Cypress Hills Interprovincial Park on the shores of Loch Leven.

== See also ==
- List of communities in Saskatchewan
