= Cypress Hills Interprovincial Park =

Interprovincial park in Western Canada

- IUCN category II (national park)
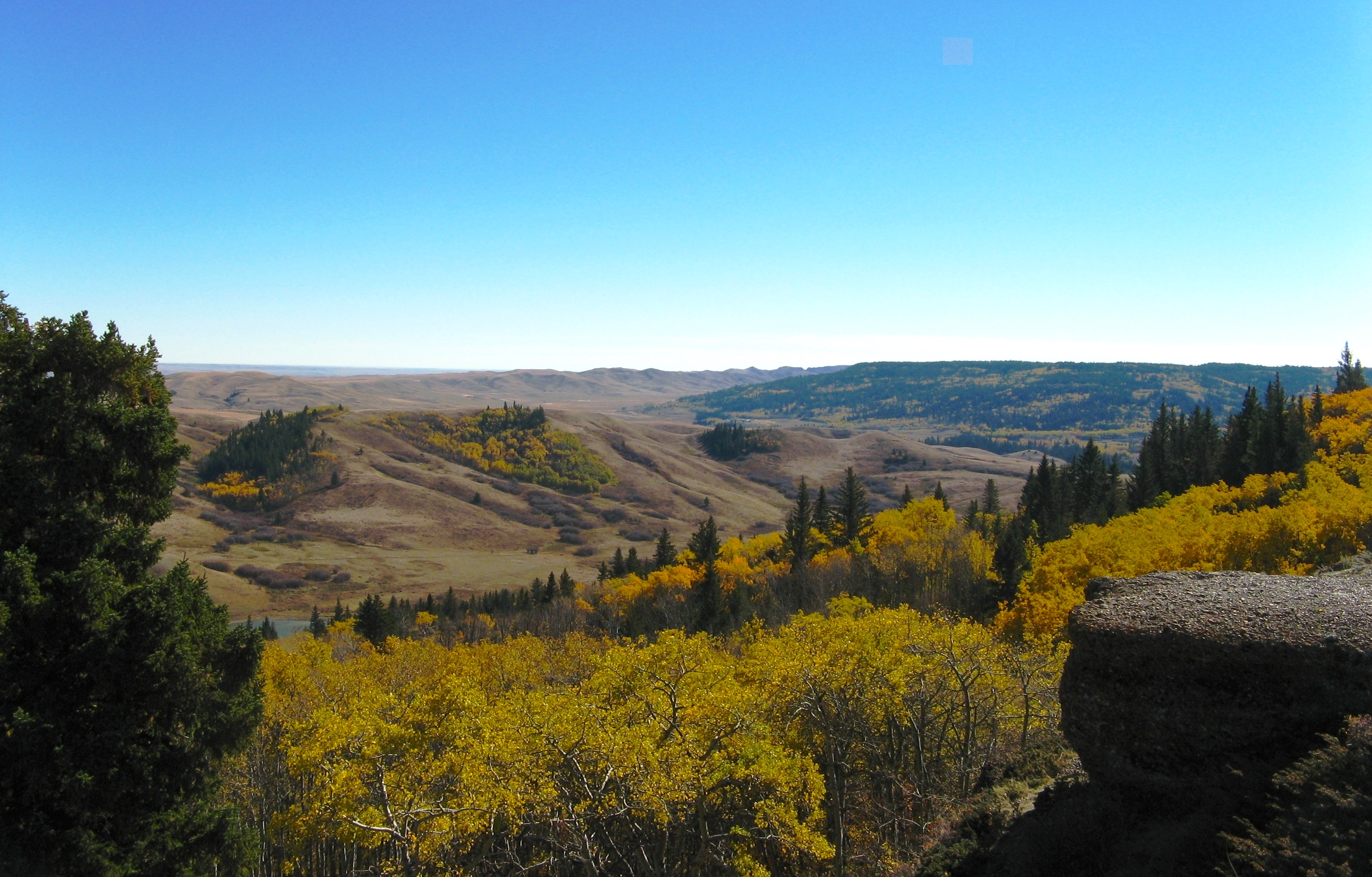
- Cypress Hills

- Location within Canada
- Interactive map of Cypress Hills Interprovincial Park
- Location: Cypress County, Alberta; RM of Maple Creek No. 111, Saskatchewan, Canada
- Nearest city: Medicine Hat, AB; Swift Current, SK
- Coordinates: 49°34′31″N 110°00′23″W
- Area: 400 km^{2} (150 sq mi)
- Established: 1931 (Saskatchewan); 1951 (Alberta); 1989 (interprovincial)
- Governing body: Alberta Environment and Parks and Sask Parks

Cypress Hills Interprovincial Park is a natural park in Canada straddling the Alberta / Saskatchewan boundary and jointly administered by the two provinces. Located south-east of Medicine Hat in the Cypress Hills, it became Canada's first interprovincial park in 1989.

The park consists of two protected areas, the 345 km^{2} (133 sq mi) West Block, that straddles the Alberta / Saskatchewan boundary between Alberta Highway 41, the townsite of Elkwater, Saskatchewan Highway 615, Saskatchewan Highway 271, and Fort Walsh, and the Centre Block, an additional area of 58 km^{2} (22 sq mi) in Saskatchewan, west of Saskatchewan Highway 21.

== Geography ==
The Cypress Hills plateau rises up to 200 m (660 ft) above the surrounding prairie, to a maximum elevation of 1,468 m (4,816 ft) at "Head of the Mountain" at the west end in Alberta, making it Canada's highest point between the Canadian Rockies and the Labrador Peninsula. Eastward across the boundary is the highest point in Saskatchewan, at 1,392 m (4,567 ft). The "West Block" of the Cypress Hills spans the provincial boundary. Battle Creek runs through the central part of the park. Although the hills seem relatively low, in a larger geographic context the plateau does rise gradually from many kilometres away so that the total elevation gain from Medicine Hat is approximately 600 metres (2,000 ft). The vegetation of park is undergoing changes through woody plant encroachment, with a detected 1% increase of shrub cover annually.

== History ==
- 1931 — Cypress Hills Provincial Park was established in Saskatchewan.
- 1951 — Cypress Hills Provincial Park was established in Alberta.
- 1989 — On August 25, the governments of Alberta and Saskatchewan signed an agreement committing themselves to cooperation on ecosystem management, education, and park promotion.
- 2000 — Fort Walsh National Historic Site (located on the Saskatchewan side of the West Block) joined the collective. Together, these three partner agencies make up the park. Both Alberta and Saskatchewan provincial governments signed the Cypress Hills Interprovincial Park agreement, establishing the first interprovincial park in Canada.
- 2001 — On August 18, Vance Petriew discovered a comet from Cypress Hills during the Saskatchewan Summer Star Party. The comet was later named 185P/Petriew.
- 2004 — On September 28, Saskatchewan Parks, Alberta Community Development, Parks Canada and the Royal Astronomical Society of Canada signed an agreement that declared the park a dark-sky preserve.
- 2011 — On August 25, the Park opened the Cypress Hills Observatory and Yurt classroom.

== Activities ==
On both sides of the park, all year long, park interpreters present education programs to school and youth groups, adult and seniors groups, and a wide range of park visitors. During the summer months, there's camping, hiking, and swimming. During the winter, there's skiing, winter camping, snowmobiling, and other winter activities. In summertime, kayak, canoe, bicycle, and stand up paddle boards are available for rent. In the winter, kicksleds, snowshoes, skates, and cross-country skis rentals are available.

=== Alberta ===
On the Alberta side of West Block, key park features include Head of the Mountain Viewpoint, the highest point between the Rocky Mountains and Labrador, the Elkwater townsite (a cottage community sitting at the same elevation as the Banff townsite), Horseshoe Canyon and Reesor Lake viewpoints (offering 100-kilometre (62 mi) views on a clear day), over 50 kilometres (31 mi) of hiking and mountain biking trails, and Hidden Valley Ski Resort. Three lakes sit on the Alberta side of the park — Elkwater Lake, Spruce Coulee Reservoir, and Reesor Lake.

=== Saskatchewan ===
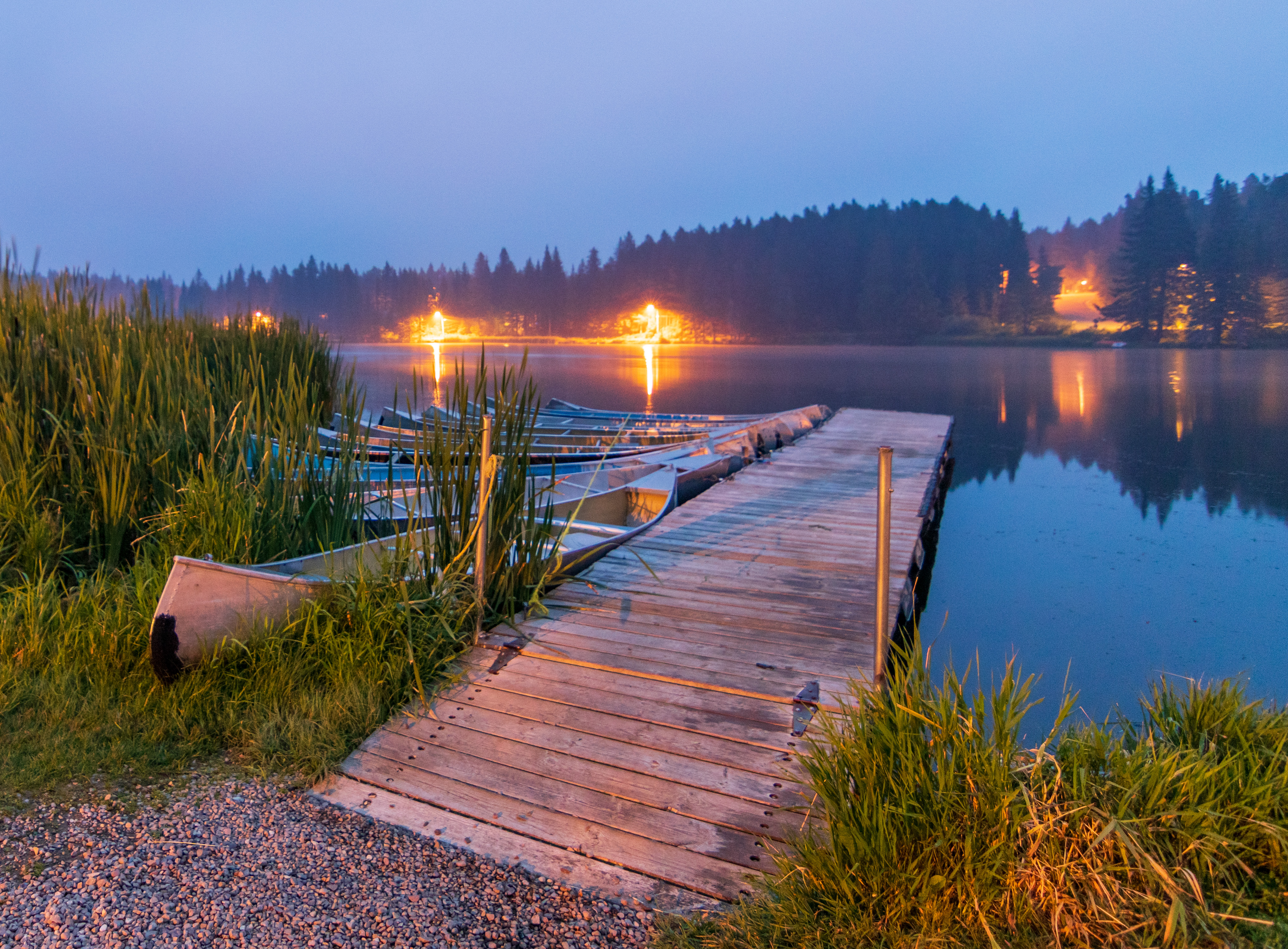
Loch Leven

Like in Alberta, there are campgrounds, hiking trails, and lakes. Some of the lakes include Harris, Adams, Coulee Lake, Loch Lomond, and Loch Leven. On the shores of Loch Leven in Centre Block is a marina, the community of Loch Leven, a restaurant, swimming pool, tourist info centre, and The Resort at Cypress Hills. In 2004, a record 3.5-kilogram (7.7 lb) brook trout was caught in the lake.

Winter amenities around the park include a winter picnic shelter, warm-up shacks, a tobogganing hill, a mini-luge slide, and Camp-Easy yurt rentals. There are also snowmobile and winter fat bike trails.

==== Cypress Hills Ski Area ====
Cypress Hills Ski Area is a cross-country ski area on the Saskatchewan side of Cypress Hills Interprovincial Park. During the winter, summer campgrounds are transformed into 9 kilometres (5.6 mi) of Cross-country skiing trails and 3.8 kilometres (2.4 mi) of snowshoeing trails. A further 27 kilometres (17 mi) of summer hiking trails are designated for cross-country skiing, 15 kilometres (9.3 mi) of which are groomed.

== Nature ==
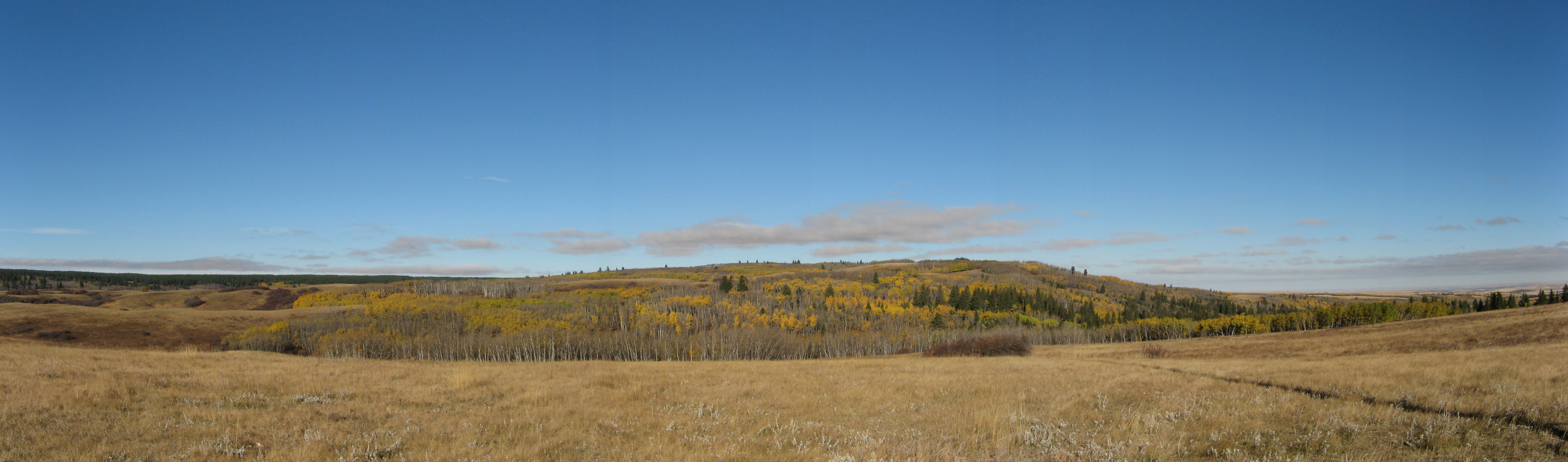
A panorama of Cypress Hills

Approximately 700 species of plants and animals thrive in the park, including 14 species of orchids.

The park protects the majority of the Cypress Hills landscape, which consists of three separate elevated blocks of lush forest and fescue grassland surrounded by dry mixed-grass prairie. The West and Centre Blocks are protected as provincial parks, and are managed by Alberta Parks and Protected Areas and Saskatchewan Parks, respectively. The "East Block" of the Cypress Hills, situated near Eastend, Saskatchewan, is not a park or protected area. The Fort Walsh National Historic Site is also located adjacent to the West Block.

=== Mammals ===
There are five species of large hoofed mammals found in the park: wapiti, moose, mule deer, white-tailed deer, and pronghorn. Other mammals found in Cypress Hills Interprovincial Park include:

Eulipotyphla

- Masked shrew (Sorex cinereus)
- American pygmy shrew (Sorex hoyi)
- Wandering shrew (Sorex vagrans)

Lagomorpha

- Snowshoe hare (Lepus americanus)
- White-tailed jackrabbit (Lepus townsendii)
- Nuttall's cottontail (Sylvilagus nuttallii)

Chiroptera

- Hoary bat (Aeorestes cinereus)
- Big brown bat (Eptesicus fuscus)
- Silver-haired bat (Lasionycteris noctivagans)
- Eastern red bat (Lasiurus borealis)
- Small-footed myotis (Myotis ciliolabrum)
- Long-eared myotis (Myotis evotis)
- Little brown myotis (Myotis lucifugus)

Carnivora

- Coyote (Canis latrans)
- North American river otter (Lontra canadensis)
- Bobcat (Lynx rufus)
- Striped skunk (Mephitis mephitis)
- Stoat (Mustela erminea)
- Black-footed ferret (Mustela nigripes)
- Least weasel (Mustela nivalis)
- Long-tailed weasel (Neogale frenata)
- American mink (Neogale vison)
- Raccoon (Procyon lotor)
- Mountain lion (Puma concolor)
- American badger (Taxidea taxus)
- Northern pocket gopher (Thomomys talpoides)
- Swift fox (Vulpes velox)

Rodentia

- North American beaver (Castor canadensis)
- Black-tailed prairie dog (Cynomys ludovicianus)
- Ord's kangaroo rat (Dipodomys ordii)
- North American porcupine (Erethizon dorsatum)
- Thirteen-lined ground squirrel (Ictidomys tridecemlineatus)
- Sagebrush vole (Lemmiscus curtatus)
- Western meadow vole (Microtus drummondii)
- Gapper's red-backed vole (Myodes gapperi)
- Least chipmunk (Neotamias minimus)
- Bushy-tailed woodrat (Neotoma cinerea)
- Muskrat (Ondatra zibethicus)
- Northern grasshopper mouse (Onychomys leucogaster)
- White-footed mouse (Peromyscus leucopus)
- Western deer mouse (Peromyscus sonoriensis)
- American red squirrel (Tamiasciurus hudsonicus)
- Richardson's ground squirrel (Urocitellus richardsonii)
- Olive-backed pocket mouse (Perognathus fasciatus)
- Western jumping mouse (Zapus princeps)

=== Fish species ===
Fish species include walleye, yellow perch, northern pike, brook, brown, westslope cutthroat and rainbow trout, burbot, common carp, white sucker, and shorthead redhorse.

== See also ==
- List of provincial parks in Saskatchewan
- List of provincial parks in Alberta
- List of protected areas of Alberta
- List of protected areas of Saskatchewan
- List of highest points of Canadian provinces and territories
- List of ski areas and resorts in Canada
