= Innuitian ice sheet =

Former ice sheet in North America

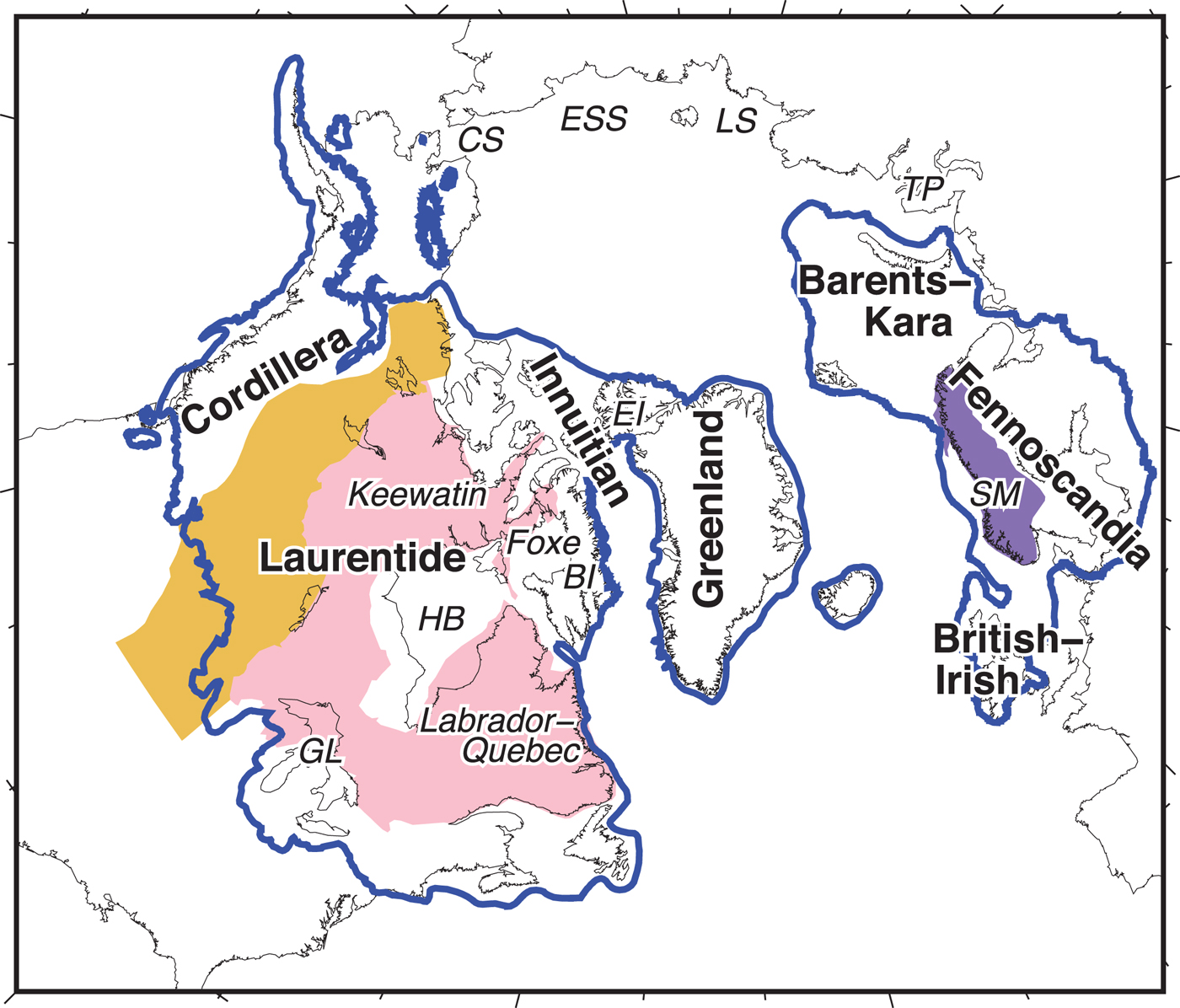
- Image of the ice sheets located in the northern hemisphere around 21,000 years before present. The Innuitian ice sheet can be found between the Greenland ice sheet and Laurentide ice sheet.
- Type: Continental
- Location: Queen Elizabeth Islands
- Status: Retreated

The Innuitian ice sheet (IIS) was an ice sheet in North America that existed during the Last Glacial Maximum.

== See also ==
- Laurentide ice sheet – Continental glacier in North America during the last ice age
- Wisconsin glaciation – Glaciation in North America during the Last Glacial Period
- Innuitian Region – Physiographic division in northern Canada
