= Nickwall, Montana =

Ghost town in Montana

Nickwall
- Ghost town
- Interactive map of Nickwall
- Country: United States
- State: Montana
- County: McCone

Nickwall is a ghost town located in McCone County, Montana.

Nickwall is located 546 kilometres (339 mi) east of Great Falls, 109 kilometres (68 mi) west of the Montana–North Dakota border, and 127 kilometres (79 mi) south of the Canada–United States border.

== Geography ==
Nickwall is located at latitude 48.049 and longitude -105.307.
