= Cypress Hills (Canada) =

Hills in Alberta and Saskatchewan, Canada

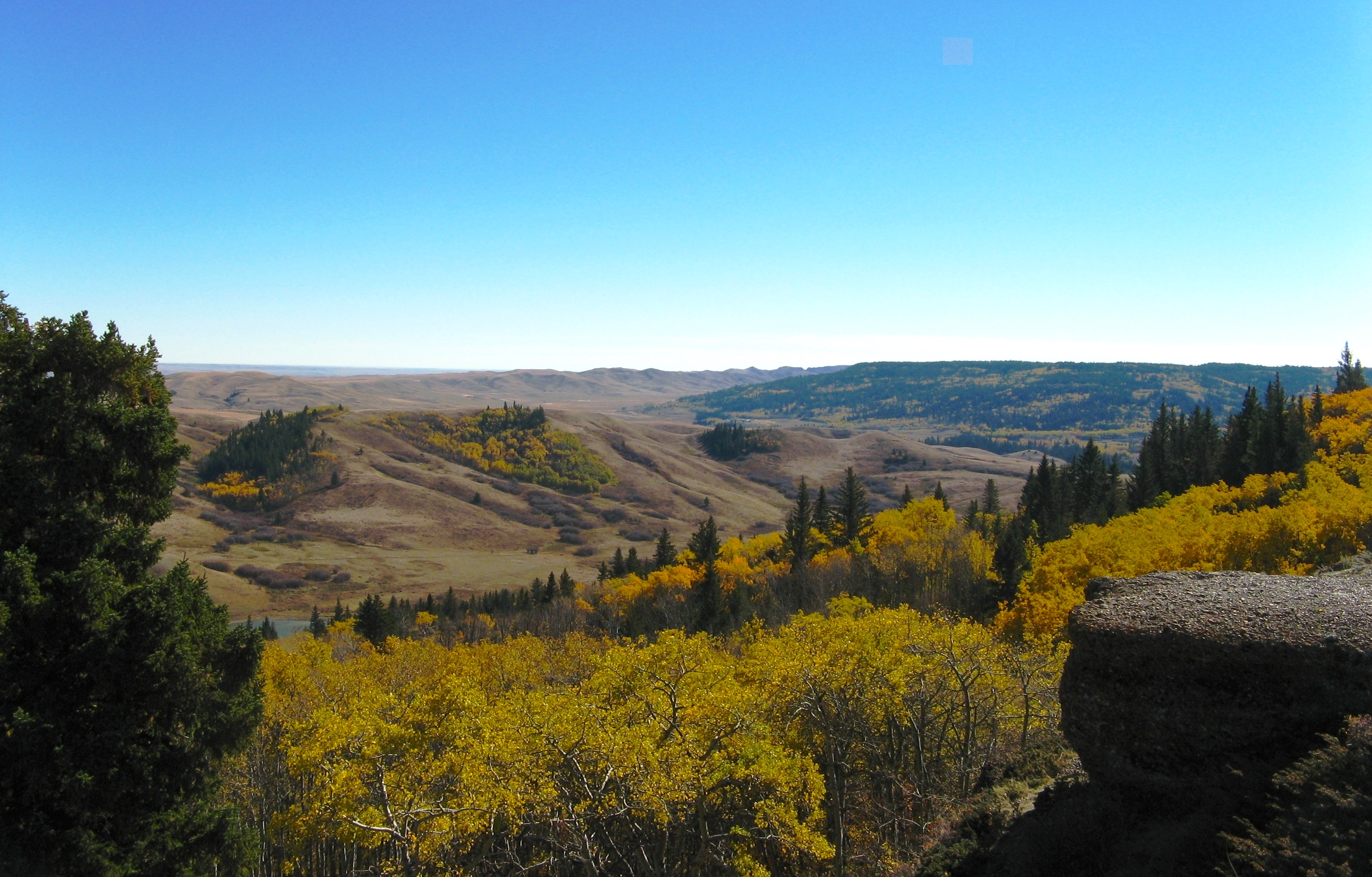
- The Cypress Hills

Highest point
- Elevation: 1,468 m (4,816 ft)
- Coordinates: 49°37′48″N 110°21′34″W

Dimensions
- Area: 2,500 km^{2} (970 sq mi)

Geography
- Location within Canada
- Location: Cypress Hills location in Western Canada
- Country: Canada
- Provinces: Alberta; Saskatchewan
- Topo map: NTS 72E9 Elkwater Lake

The Cypress Hills are a geographical region of hills in southwestern Saskatchewan and southeastern Alberta, Canada. The hills are part of the Missouri Coteau upland. The hills cover an area of approximately 2,500 km^{2} (970 sq mi). About 400 km^{2} (150 sq mi) or 16% of this area is an interprovincial park.

The highest point in the Cypress Hills is at Head of the Mountain in Alberta at 1,466 m (4,810 ft). The highest point in Saskatchewan is an unnamed point (49°33′06″N 109°59′14″W) at 1,392 m (4,567 ft).

== Name ==
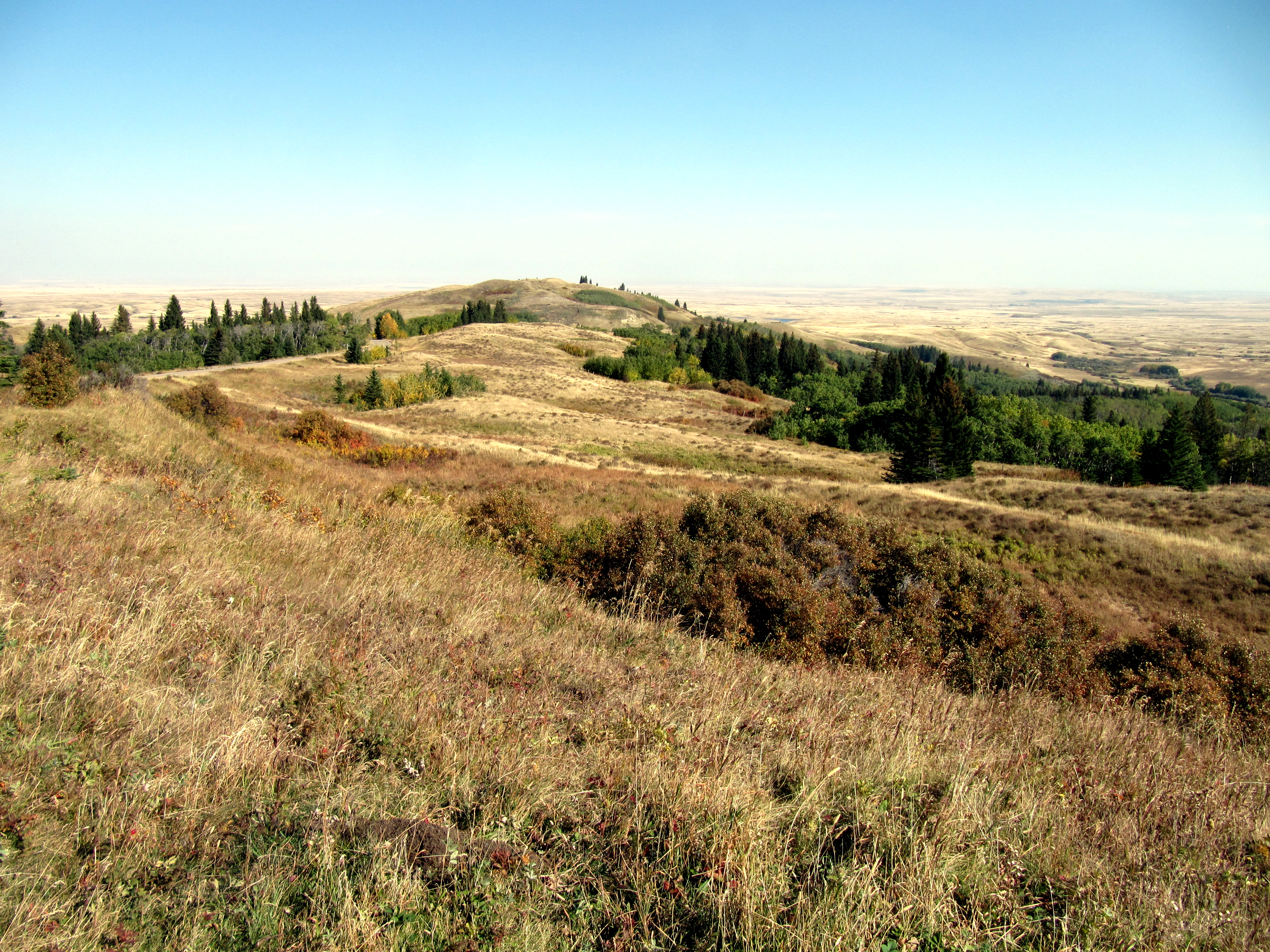
Cypress Hills Grassland

The Cypress Hills have been known by a wide number of Indigenous and European names throughout their history. An 1882 Blackfoot–English dictionary written by C. M. Lanning provided the Blackfoot language name I-kim-e-kooy, which translates as 'striped earth' or 'earth over earth'. The Cree language name, in use at the same time, is manâtakâw, (spelled in a variety of anglicized forms including Mun-a-tuh-gow), sometimes said to mean 'beautiful upland' but more accurately referring to 'an area to be respected, protected, taken care of and/or taken care with'. The Assiniboine language name is wazíȟe. The Gros Ventre language name is θáaciih 'pine trees'. Early Métis hunters, who spoke Métis French, called the hills les montagnes des Cyprès, in reference to the abundance of lodgepole pine trees. In the Canadian French spoken by the Métis, the pine is called cyprès, although it is not a true cypress tree. The English translation is 'Cypress Hills'.

== Geology and geomorphology ==
The Cypress Hills reach a maximum elevation of 1,466 m (4,810 ft), rising about 600 m (2,000 ft) above the surrounding plains. This makes the Cypress Hills the highest point in Canada between the Rockies and Labrador. They are the remnant of a more widespread plateau, most of which has been removed by erosion. The plateau is capped by the resistant conglomerate and sandstone beds of the Cypress Hills Formation. That formation was deposited by rivers that flowed from the mountains of southwestern Alberta and northwestern Montana during late Eocene to middle Miocene time, and is known for its wealth of vertebrate fossils.

During the Pleistocene, the top of the Cypress Hills was not overridden by the Laurentide Ice Sheet and remained unglaciated. As the ice sheet paused periodically during its final retreat, a series of morainal ridges of glacial till built up around the hills. Rivers of meltwater cut large channels through the area as the retreat continued, and smaller streams carved coulees and areas of badlands.

Today the Cypress Hills are part of a major drainage divide that separates rivers that drain south to the Gulf of Mexico via the Missouri River system from those that drain to northeast to Hudson Bay via the Nelson River system. At the Dividing Springs Ranch northwest of Eastend, Saskatchewan, the water from a spring goes both south to Gulf of Mexico and northeast to Hudson Bay.

== Ecology ==
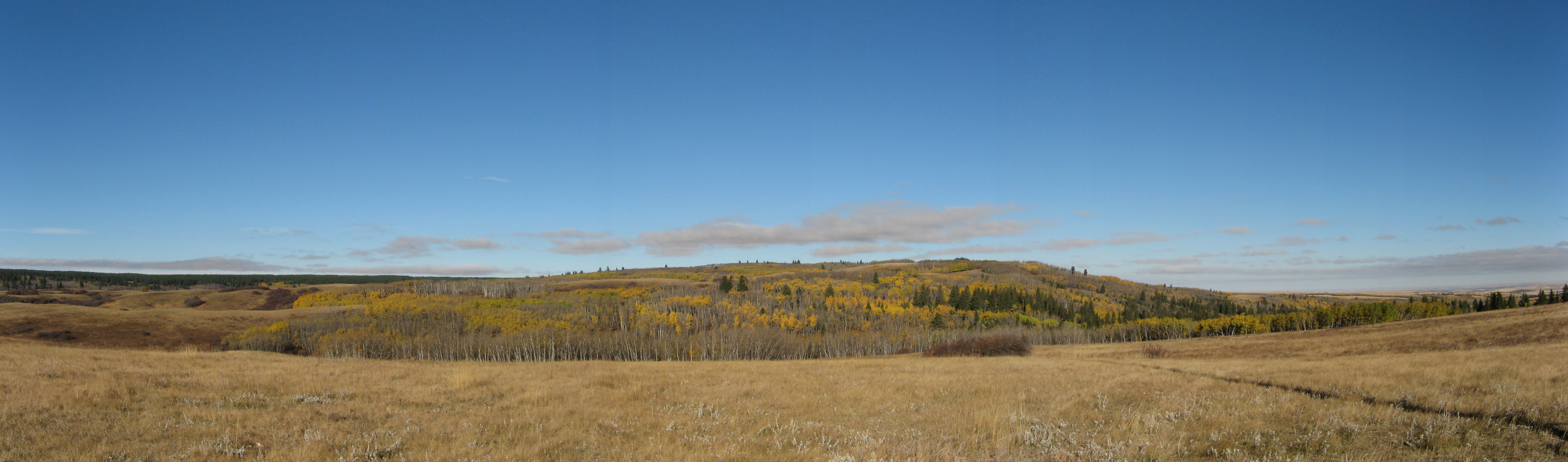
The Cypress Hills

Due to their higher elevation, the upper slopes and summit of the Cypress Hills experience cooler temperatures and greater rainfall than the surrounding semi-arid plains, and they support a flora and fauna that is much like that of the mountains south of the Canada–United States border in Montana and Wyoming.

=== Flora ===
The north-facing slopes and some of the valleys host forests of aspen, lodgepole pine, and white spruce. The remainder of the area is covered by mixed grass prairie, with fescue prairie in higher areas. Wildflowers include prairie crocus, three-flowered avens, lupine, blue bells, and prairie rose. There are fourteen species of orchids, including the Venus's slipper orchid and the striped coralroot orchid, which are found primarily in wooded areas and along the banks of springs and streams. Case studies have detected vegetation changes through woody plant encroachment, with an annual increase of shrub cover of 1 per cent.

=== Fauna ===
Small mammals of the area include a wide variety of rodents, as well as shrews, bats, jackrabbits, skunks, mink, weasels, foxes, bobcats, Canada lynx, and others. Large mammals include moose, elk, mule deer, white-tailed deer, pronghorn, coyotes, cougars, and more. There are several species of snakes, including the prairie rattlesnake, as well as lizards and turtles. The many species of birds range from mountain bluebird and greater sage-grouse to the great horned owl and other birds of prey. Fish in Elkwater Lake and other lakes and streams in the area include walleye, yellow perch, northern pike, several species of trout, and others.

== History ==
Historically the Cypress Hills were a meeting and conflict area for various Native Americans and Indigenous Canadians (First Nations) including the Cree, Assiniboine, Atsina, Blackfoot Confederacy, Saulteaux, Sioux, Crow, and others. During the 19th century Métis settled in the hills, hunting and often wintering there. The Cypress Hills Massacre, a key event in Canadian history leading to the creation of the North-West Mounted Police, occurred in the hills when a group of American wolf hunters, known as wolfers, from Montana massacred an Assiniboine encampment. Fort Walsh was established to bring law and order to the Canada–United States border region.

== Interprovincial park ==
Cypress Hills Provincial Park – one of the six original provincial parks of Saskatchewan – was established in 1931. In 1951, it was extended into neighbouring Alberta. Cypress Hills Interprovincial Park was created in 1989, which joined the two parks on either side of the provincial border.

The Saskatchewan side of the park is divided into two blocks: Centre Block, which has fully developed year round tourist facilities, and West Block Wilderness area, with rustic camping and the location of Fort Walsh National Historic Site. Centre Block is located 30 kilometres (19 mi) south of Maple Creek on Highway 21. West Block is located 45 kilometres (28 mi) southwest of Maple Creek on Highway 271.

The Alberta portion of the Cypress Hills contains the tourist destination of Elkwater, a community with campground facilities located on the southern shore of Elkwater Lake. The townsite is mainly made up of summer cabins. Elkwater is located about 70 kilometres (43 mi) southeast of Medicine Hat.

== Climate ==
Cypress Hills has a subarctic climate (Dfc) bordering on a humid continental climate (Dfb) due to its elevation above the surrounding area. Summer days are mild to warm coupled with cool nights, while winters are cold and snowy with annual snowfall averaging 255.2 cm (100.5 in). It is also considerably more moist than the surrounding prairies. Precipitation peaks during the month of June, where thunderstorms are common. Chinook winds can raise the temperature 5 °C (9.0 °F) in an hour, with it not being uncommon for the temperature to go from −10 to 20 °C (14 to 68 °F) in a 12-hour period. The highest single day snowfall is 60 cm (24 in) which occurred on 28 May 1982. The highest snow depth recorded is 80 cm (31 in) on 28 February 1994. The highest temperature recorded is 40.5 °C (104.9 °F) and occurred on 29 May 1988. The lowest temperature recorded is −42.5 °C (−44.5 °F) and occurred on 13 January 2005.

Climate data for Cypress Hills Climate ID: 4021996; coordinates 49°40′N 109°28′W; elevation: 1,196 m (3,924 ft); 1981−2010 normals
Month	Jan	Feb	Mar	Apr	May	Jun	Jul	Aug	Sep	Oct	Nov	Dec	Year
Record high °C (°F)	19.0 (66.2)	18.0 (64.4)	19.0 (66.2)	26.0 (78.8)	40.5 (104.9)	34.0 (93.2)	34.5 (94.1)	34.5 (94.1)	32.0 (89.6)	28.0 (82.4)	21.0 (69.8)	15.0 (59.0)	40.5 (104.9)
Mean daily maximum °C (°F)	−3.0 (26.6)	−1.4 (29.5)	2.4 (36.3)	9.8 (49.6)	15.2 (59.4)	19.1 (66.4)	23.2 (73.8)	22.8 (73.0)	16.6 (61.9)	10.1 (50.2)	1.7 (35.1)	−2.3 (27.9)	9.5 (49.1)
Daily mean °C (°F)	−9 (16)	−7.2 (19.0)	−2.9 (26.8)	3.5 (38.3)	8.7 (47.7)	12.7 (54.9)	15.9 (60.6)	15.3 (59.5)	9.6 (49.3)	4.0 (39.2)	−3.5 (25.7)	−8.0 (17.6)	3.3 (37.9)
Mean daily minimum °C (°F)	−15.0 (5.0)	−13.0 (8.6)	−8.2 (17.2)	−2.9 (26.8)	2.1 (35.8)	6.3 (43.3)	8.6 (47.5)	7.6 (45.7)	2.7 (36.9)	−2.2 (28.0)	−8.6 (16.5)	−13.7 (7.3)	−3.0 (26.6)
Record low °C (°F)	−42.5 (−44.5)	−40.0 (−40.0)	−35.5 (−31.9)	−26.5 (−15.7)	−11.5 (11.3)	−3.5 (25.7)	0.0 (32.0)	−4.0 (24.8)	−10.0 (14.0)	−28.5 (−19.3)	−39.0 (−38.2)	−41.5 (−42.7)	−42.5 (−44.5)
Average precipitation mm (inches)	33.3 (1.31)	31.0 (1.22)	43.3 (1.70)	41.4 (1.63)	74.0 (2.91)	103.3 (4.07)	59.7 (2.35)	47.8 (1.88)	58.9 (2.32)	36.8 (1.45)	32.8 (1.29)	38.3 (1.51)	600.6 (23.64)
Average rainfall mm (inches)	0.0 (0.0)	0.1 (0.00)	1.9 (0.07)	15.9 (0.63)	51.1 (2.01)	103 (4.1)	59.7 (2.35)	46.8 (1.84)	51.1 (2.01)	13.6 (0.54)	1.9 (0.07)	0.2 (0.01)	345.4 (13.60)
Average snowfall cm (inches)	33.3 (13.1)	31.0 (12.2)	41.3 (16.3)	25.5 (10.0)	22.8 (9.0)	0.3 (0.1)	0.0 (0.0)	0.9 (0.4)	7.7 (3.0)	23.2 (9.1)	30.9 (12.2)	38.1 (15.0)	255.2 (100.5)
Average precipitation days (≥ 0.2 mm)	9.7	9.6	10.5	9.8	11.5	14.3	10.4	9.8	9.7	8.4	9.5	11	124.3
Average rainy days (≥ 0.2 mm)	0.0	0.1	0.81	4.2	9.5	14.3	10.4	9.7	8.8	4.3	1.1	0.2	63.5
Average snowy days (≥ 0.2 cm)	9.7	9.1	10	6.4	2.8	0.1	0.0	0.1	1.7	4.6	8.9	10.9	64.1
Source: Environment and Climate Change Canada

== In popular culture ==
The Cypress Hills region is featured in Saskatchewan-based country singer Colter Wall's 2022 single "Cypress Hills and the Big Country".

== See also ==
- List of highest points of Canadian provinces and territories
- List of mountains of Saskatchewan
- Geography of Saskatchewan
- Geography of Alberta
