= Lake Athletic Conference =

The Lake Athletic Conference (LAC) was a high school athletic conference serving members of the Indiana High School Athletic Association. The LAC existed in multiple guises from the fall of 1969 through the spring of 2007, at which time it comprised sixteen member high schools. The conference took its name from all its early members being located in Lake County, Indiana, in addition to the predecessing Lake 10 Conference, of which many schools were members before expansion increased the number of schools in the conference.

== History ==
The Lake Athletic Conference began as the Tri-City Conference in 1968, changing its name to the Indiana Lake Shore Conference the next year. The conference was formed by the non-Gary schools in the Northwestern Conference at that point. The eight founding schools were: Clark, Gavit, Hammond, Morton, and Tech from Hammond, Roosevelt and Washington from East Chicago, and Whiting High School. The conference would reach its largest size four years later, as Bishop Noll joined, putting the conference at eight football schools and nine total schools (Whiting would compete as an independent in football until 1993).

The conference would lose schools in the 1980s, eventually ending up with six members (five in football). Hammond Tech would close in 1981, and Roosevelt and Washington would combine to form East Chicago Central in 1986. ECC would leave after that year. These remaining schools would band together with four schools from the Lake Suburban Conference to form the Lake 10 Conference.

The Lake 10 was initially split into two enrollment divisions in football only. However, this would only last for five years before the conference would expand to 13 schools and rebrand itself as the LAC. The league added two schools from the Northwest Hoosier Conference and Andrean, who had been independent since leaving the Northwestern in 1975. Three more schools would join in 2003, giving the LAC 16 teams for its final four seasons.

In 2006 it was announced the LAC would disband following the 2006-'07 school year. The schools would split into three conferences. The Northwest Crossroads Conference comprises Andrean, Griffith, Highland, Hobart, Kankakee Valley, Lowell, and Munster, which were the larger of the schools in the conference in terms of enrollment. The Greater South Shore Conference is home to Bishop Noll, Calumet, Lake Station, Wheeler, and Whiting; joining these schools are Michigan City Marquette Catholic, North Newton, and River Forest; and South Central, a member of the Porter County Conference, joined in football only, as Marquette does not have a football team. The Hammond City Schools - Clark, Gavit, Hammond High, and Morton - formed the Great Lakes Athletic Conference, after failing to find acceptance in another conference. It was reported that Hammond Morton was invited to join the NCC but declined.

== Membership ==
| School | Location | Mascot | Colors | County | Year Joined | Previous Conference | Year Left | Conference Joined |
|---|---|---|---|---|---|---|---|---|
| Hammond Clark | Hammond | Pioneers | | 45; Lake | 1968 | Northwestern | 2007 | Great Lakes |
| Hammond Gavit | Hammond | Gladiators | | 45; Lake | 1968 | Northwestern | 2007 | Great Lakes |
| Hammond | Hammond | Wildcats | | 45; Lake | 1968 | Northwestern | 2007 | Great Lakes |
| Hammond Morton | Hammond | Governors | | 45; Lake | 1968 | Northwestern | 2007 | Great Lakes |
| East Chicago Roosevelt | East Chicago | Rough Riders | | 45; Lake | 1968 | Northwestern | 1986 | none (consolidated into East Chicago Central) |
| Hammond Tech | Hammond | Tigers | | 45; Lake | 1968 | Northwestern | 1981 | none (school closed) |
| East Chicago Washington | East Chicago | Senators | | 45; Lake | 1968 | Northwestern | 1986 | none (consolidated into East Chicago Central) |
| Whiting | Whiting | Oilers | | 45; Lake | 1968 | Northwestern | 2007 | Greater South Shore |
| Hammond Bishop Noll | Hammond | Warriors | | 45; Lake | 1973 | Independents | 2007 | Greater South Shore |
| East Chicago Central | East Chicago | Cardinals | | 45; Lake | 1986 | none (new school) | 1987 | Independents |
| Calumet | Calumet Township | Warriors | | 45; Lake | 1993 | Lake Suburban | 2007 | Greater South Shore |
| Griffith | Griffith | Panthers | | 45; Lake | 1993 | Lake Suburban | 2007 | Northwest Crossroads |
| Highland | Highland | Trojans | | 45; Lake | 1993 | Lake Suburban | 2007 | Northwest Crossroads |
| Munster | Munster | Mustangs | | 45; Lake | 1993 | Lake Suburban | 2007 | Northwest Crossroads |
| Andrean | Merrillville | Fighting '59ers | | 45; Lake | 1998 | Independents | 2007 | Northwest Crossroads |
| Lake Station Edison | Lake Station | Fighting Eagles | | 45; Lake | 1998 | Northwest Hoosier | 2007 | Greater South Shore |
| Lowell | Lowell | Red Devils | | 45; Lake | 1998 | Northwest Hoosier | 2007 | Northwest Crossroads |
| Hobart | Hobart | Brickies | | 45; Lake | 2003 | Duneland | 2007 | Northwest Crossroads |
| Kankakee Valley | Wheatfield | Kougars | | 37; Jasper | 2003 | Independents | 2007 | Northwest Crossroads |
| Wheeler | Union Township | Bearcats | | 64; Porter | 2003 | Porter County | 2007 | Greater South Shore |

== Divisions ==
| 1993–98 (fb) | | 1998–2003 | | 2003–07 | |
| Black | Blue | Black | Blue | Black | Blue |
|---|---|---|---|---|---|
| Bishop Noll | Calumet | Andrean | Bishop Noll | Andrean | Bishop Noll |
| Hammond | Clark | Griffith | Calumet | Griffith | Calumet |
| Highland | Gavit | Hammond | Clark | Hammond | Clark |
| Morton | Griffith | Highland | Edison | Highland | Edison |
| Munster | Whiting | Lowell | Gavit | Hobart | Gavit |
| | | Munster | Morton | Lowell | Kankakee Valley |
| | | | Whiting | Morton | Wheeler |
| | | | | Munster | Whiting |

== State Champions ==
- Baseball (3): 2002-Munster (4A), 2004-Bishop Noll (2A), 2005-Andrean (3A)
- Football (4): 1989-Bishop Noll (3A), 1997-Griffith (4A), 2004-Andrean (3A), 2005-Lowell (4A)
- Girls Gymnastics (1): 2004-Hobart
- Softball (2): 2006-Whiting (1A), 2007-Andrean (3A)

== Related links ==
- Northern Indiana Football History
- Indiana High School Athletic Association
