= Northwestern Conference (IHSAA) =

The Northwestern Conference was an IHSAA-sanctioned athletic conference involving schools from Gary, Indiana.

== History ==
The conference was formed in 1963, after the West Division of the Northern Indiana Conference split. At this time, the conference encompassed most of the schools in Gary (except for Edison, Roosevelt, and Wirt; Edison would close in 1968, the other two would join later), Hammond (except for Gavit and Morton, who would join in 1966), and East Chicago schools, as well as the schools from Valparaiso and Whiting.

The conference expanded to 16 schools in 1966, adding Hobart High School, as well as Gary Roosevelt, Hammond Gavit and Hammond Morton. The expansion moved the conference into divisions: the East Division consisted of the Gary schools, Hobart, and Valparaiso, the West Division consisting of the East Chicago, Hammond, and Whiting schools.

The conference changed its name to the Gary City Series in 1968, as Hobart and Valparaiso became independent, with the rest of the non-Gary schools formed the Indiana Lake Shore Conference. These schools would be replaced by parochial school Andrean, and the new Gary West Side. The next year, Gary Froebel and Tolleston closed, and the conference reverted to the Northwestern Conference moniker. Wirt would join in 1970 from the old Calumet Conference, and Andrean left to be independent in 1975.

The conference membership has decreased over the years as schools closed (Emerson in 1981, Mann in 2004,Wirt in 2009, and Lew Wallace in 2014), with the remaining two schools forced to become independent in 2014.

== Membership ==
School	City	Mascot	Colors	County	Year joined	Previous conference	Year left	Conference joined
East Chicago Roosevelt	East Chicago	Rough Riders		45; Lake	1963	Northern Indiana	1968	Tri-City
East Chicago Washington	East Chicago	Senators		45; Lake	1963	Northern Indiana	1968	Tri-City
Gary Emerson	Gary	Tornado		45; Lake	1963	Northern Indiana	1981	none (school closed, reopened as Emerson VPA)
Gary Froebel	Gary	Blue Devils		45; Lake	1963	Northern Indiana	1969	none (school became MS, closed 1977)
Gary Mann	Gary	Horsemen		45; Lake	1963	Northern Indiana	2004	none (school closed)
Gary Tolleston	Gary	Blue Raiders		45; Lake	1963	Northern Indiana	1969	none (school became MS, closed 2007)
Gary Wallace	Gary	Hornets		45; Lake	1963	Northern Indiana	2014	none (school closed 2014)
Hammond	Hammond	Wildcats		45; Lake	1963	Northern Indiana	1968	Tri-City
Hammond Clark	Hammond	Pioneers		45; Lake	1963	Northern Indiana	1968	Tri-City
Hammond Tech	Hammond	Tigers		45; Lake	1963	Northern Indiana	1968	Tri-City
Valparaiso	Valparaiso	Vikings		64; Porter	1963	Northern Indiana	1968	Independents (Duneland 1970)
Whiting	Whiting	Oilers		45; Lake	1963	Northern Indiana	1968	Tri-City
Gary Roosevelt	Gary	Panthers		45; Lake	1966	Independents	2014	Independents
Hammond Gavit	Hammond	Gladiators		45; Lake	1966	Independents	1968	Tri-City
Hammond Morton	Hammond	Governors		45; Lake	1966	Independents	1968	Tri-City
Hobart	Hobart	Brickies		45; Lake	1966	Independents	1968	Independents (Duneland 1970)
Andrean	Gary	59ers		45; Lake	1968	Independents	1975	Independents (school moved to Merrillville)
Gary West Side	Gary	Cougars		45; Lake	1968	none (new school)	2014	Independents (GLAC 2018)
Gary Wirt	Gary	Troopers		45; Lake	1970	Calumet	2009	school closed

== Resources ==
- IHSAA Conferences
- IHSAA Directory
