= North Township, Lake County, Indiana =

North Township
- Township
- Logo

- Coordinates: 41°36′40″N 87°28′52″W
- Country: United States
- State: Indiana
- County: Lake

Government
  - Type: Indiana township
  - Body: Township Board
  - Member: Peter Katic (D)
  - Member: Richard J. Novak (D)
  - Member: Lisa Salinas Matonovich (D)
  - Trustee: Adrian Santos (D)

Area
  - Total: 58.87 sq mi (152.5 km^{2})
  - Land: 53.17 sq mi (137.7 km^{2})
  - Water: 5.7 sq mi (15 km^{2})
- Elevation: 591 ft (180 m)

Population (2020)
  - Total: 156,686
  - Density: 3,063.1/sq mi (1,182.7/km^{2})
- Time zone: UTC-6 (Central)
  - Summer (DST): UTC-5 (Central)
- ZIP Codes: 46312, 46320-25, 46327, 46394
- Area code: 219
- FIPS code: 18-54414
- GNIS feature ID: 453677
- Website: northtownshiptrustee.com

North Township is one of 11 townships in Lake County, Indiana. As of the 2020 census, its population was 156,686.

Historical population
| Census | Pop. | Note | %± |
|---|---|---|---|
| 1890 | 9,631 | | — |
| 1900 | 21,020 | | 118.3% |
| 1910 | 48,361 | | 130.1% |
| 1920 | 84,743 | | 75.2% |
| 1930 | 132,752 | | 56.7% |
| 1940 | 139,602 | | 5.2% |
| 1950 | 162,157 | | 16.2% |
| 1960 | 204,101 | | 25.9% |
| 1970 | 203,480 | | −0.3% |
| 1980 | 185,736 | | −8.7% |
| 1990 | 166,928 | | −10.1% |
| 2000 | 165,656 | | −0.8% |
| 2010 | 162,855 | | −1.7% |
| 2020 | 156,686 | | −3.8% |
Source: US Decennial Census

== History ==
North Township was formed in 1837 as one of the original townships of Lake County. At that time it stretched across the entire north portion of the county. Its boundaries were reduced a number of times in the 19th century, including in 1849 by the formation of Hobart Township south of the Little Calumet River and in 1883 by the formation of Calumet Township, Lake County, Indiana from the area between Hobart Township and Lake Michigan. In 2022, its boundaries expanded to include much of Griffith, which moved from Calumet Township to North Township after a lengthy dispute between Griffith and Calumet Township.

The earliest known community in North Township was Gibson, now part of Hammond, which was located near the site of the present-day Gibson Yard on the Indiana Harbor Belt railroad.

== Geography ==
According to the 2010 census, the township has a total area of 58.87 square miles (152.5 km^{2}), of which 53.17 square miles (137.7 km^{2}) (or 90.32%) is land and 5.7 square miles (15 km^{2}) (or 9.68%) is water.

== Demographics ==
North Township, Lake County, Indiana – Racial and ethnic composition Note: the US Census treats Hispanic/Latino as an ethnic category. This table excludes Latinos from the racial categories and assigns them to a separate category. Hispanics/Latinos may be of any race.
| Race / Ethnicity (NH = Non-Hispanic) | Pop 2000 | Pop 2010 | Pop 2020 | % 2000 | % 2010 | % 2020 |
|---|---|---|---|---|---|---|
| White alone (NH) | 99,788 | 76,135 | 60,055 | 60.24% | 46.75% | 38.33% |
| Black or African American alone (NH) | 23,802 | 31,605 | 33,352 | 14.37% | 19.41% | 21.29% |
| Native American or Alaska Native alone (NH) | 268 | 253 | 198 | 0.16% | 0.16% | 0.13% |
| Asian alone (NH) | 1,651 | 2,550 | 2,623 | 1.00% | 1.57% | 1.67% |
| Native Hawaiian or Pacific Islander alone (NH) | 49 | 16 | 37 | 0.03% | 0.01% | 0.02% |
| Other race alone (NH) | 145 | 162 | 113 | 0.09% | 0.10% | 0.89% |
| Mixed race or Multiracial (NH) | 1,832 | 1,973 | 4,290 | 1.11% | 1.21% | 2.74% |
| Hispanic or Latino (any race) | 38,121 | 50,161 | 55,635 | 23.01% | 30.80% | 35.51% |
| Total | 165,656 | 162,855 | 156,686 | 100.00% | 100.00% | 100.00% |

== Municipalities ==
=== Cities ===
- East Chicago
- Hammond
- Whiting

=== Towns ===
- Highland
- Munster
- Griffith (partly in St. John Township)

=== Other Communities ===
- Hessville
- Marktown at 41.659010°N 87.467541°W
- Maynard at 41.541424°N 87.508652°W
- Osborn at 41.592537°N 87.468933°W
- Woodmar at 41.585037°N 87.490318°W

=== Ghost Town ===
- Gibson at 41.612121°N 87.499547°W

== Education ==
There are five public school districts in North Township:

- School City of East Chicago
- School City of Hammond
- School City of Whiting
- School Town of Highland
- School Town of Munster

The privately owned and operated Bishop Noll Institute is located in Hammond.
