= List of people from Hammond, Indiana =

The following is a list of notable people who were born, grew up, and/or spent a portion of life and or career in Hammond, Indiana.

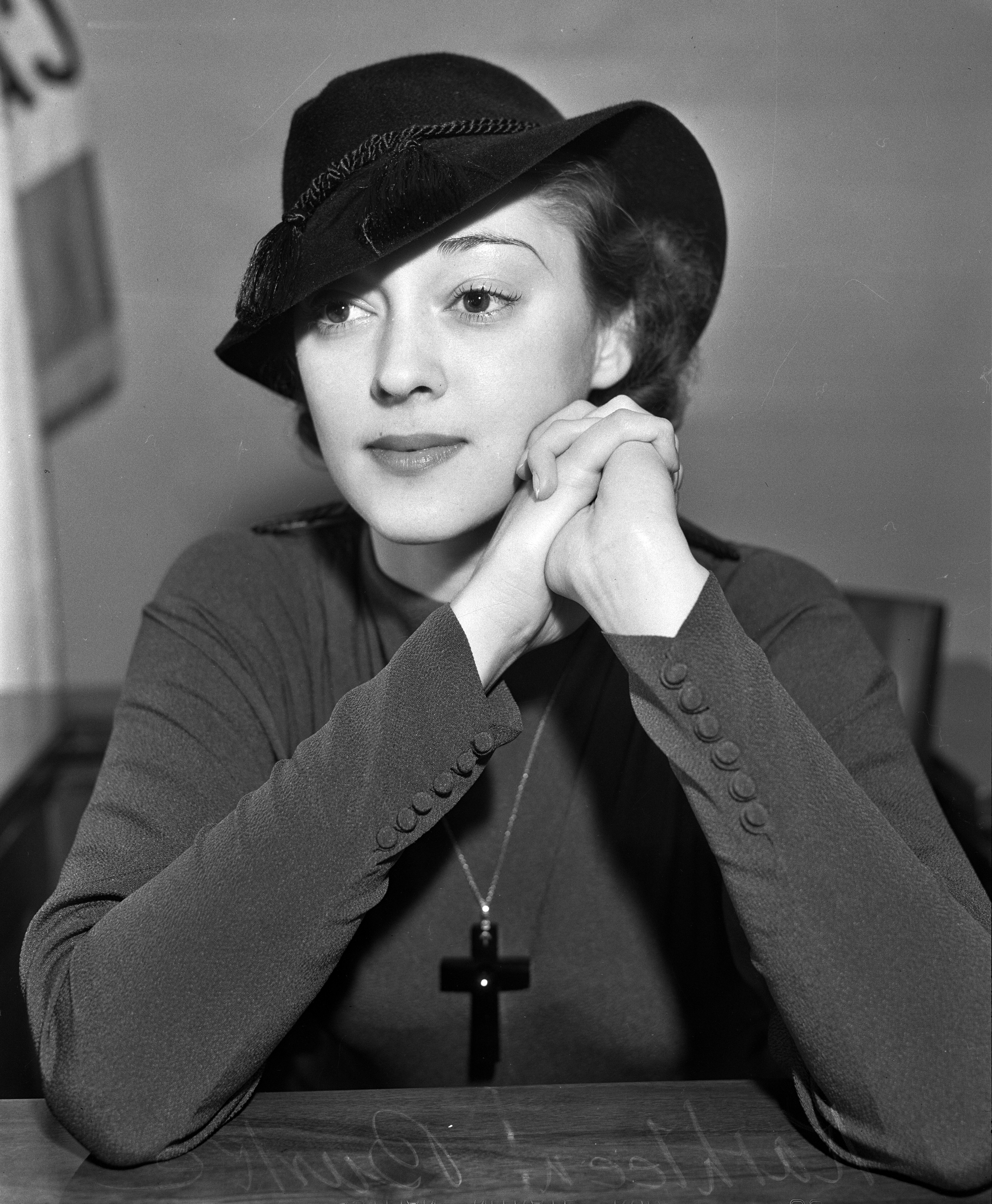
- Kathleen Burke
  Robert K. Abbett – artist, illustrator
- R.J.Q. Adams – historian
- Bob Anderson – born in East Chicago, raised in Hammond, baseball player
- Norman C. Anderson – speaker of the Wisconsin State Assembly
- Michael Badnarik – Libertarian Party 2004 presidential candidate
- Gerald R. Beaman – U.S. Navy admiral
- Dodie Bellamy – author
- Stephan Bonnar – UFC fighter
- Kathleen Burke – actress
- Darrel Chaney – baseball player
- Bob Chapek – former CEO of The Walt Disney Company
- Jack Chevigny – football player, coach, lawyer, and United States Marine Corps officer
- Denny Clanton – soccer player
- Bartlett Cormack – playwright and screenwriter
- Irv Cross, NFL player and commentator
- Alberta Darling – Wisconsin politician
- Jon Deak – contrabassist
- John H. Eastwood – US Army Air Corps chaplain, World War II
- Hal Faverty – NFL player
- Maxx Frank – gospel singer
- DJ Rashad – notable footwork DJ/producer
- Dory Funk – professional wrestler fighting under both his real name and as "The Outlaw"
- Dory Funk Jr. – professional wrestler and wrestling trainer
- Terry Funk – professional wrestler and actor
- Neil Goodman – sculptor and educator
- George Groves – professional football player
- Bob Haak – football player
- Wally Hess – football player
- Jack Hyles - Independent Baptist pastor, one-time pastor of First Baptist Church of Hammond
- Mitchell F. Jayne, musician and author
- Khari Jones – player in Canadian Football League, television commentator
- Jeremy Jordan – actor, singer
- Bruce Konopka – baseball player
- Ken Kremer – football player
- Jim Lewis – Disney and Wal-Mart executive
- Bob Livingstone – football player
- Thomas McDermott, Jr. – mayor
- Monica Maxwell – basketball player, played in Women's National Basketball Association
- Roy McPipe – basketball player, drafted by NBA in '73 and '74, played with ABA's Utah Stars in 1975
- Carl Frederick Mengeling – bishop of Lansing 1996–2008
- Joseph F. Meyer – horticulturist, herbalist, founder of the Indiana Botanic Gardens
- Phil Montgomery – Wisconsin politician
- Frank J. Mrvan – U.S. representative from Indiana's 1st Congressional District, elected in 2020
- Billy Muffett – baseball player
- Art Murakowski – football player
- Larry E. Overman – organic chemist
- Samuel Panayotovich – Illinois politician
- Merle Pertile – model, Playboy Playmate, January 1962
- Charles B. Pierce – filmmaker
- Fritz Pollard – first black NFL head coach for now-defunct Hammond Pros, member of Pro Football Hall of Fame
- Alvah Curtis Roebuck – founded Sears, Roebuck and Company
- Mike D. Rogers – Alabama politician
- Aaron Rosand – violin soloist
- Jordan Schafer – baseball player
- Ryan Schau – football player
- Mike Sember – baseball player
- Scott Sheldon – baseball player
- Jean Shepherd – born in Chicago, raised in Hammond, TV and radio personality, best known as writer and narrator of film A Christmas Story (1983)
- Bobby Skafish – Chicago radio personality
- Chips Sobek – basketball player, coach and official
- Glenn Michael Souther – US Navy defector to Soviet Union
- Miguel Torres – UFC fighter
- Jimmy Valiant – professional wrestler
- Lois V. Vierk – music composer of post-minimalist and totalist schools
- David Wilkerson – minister, evangelist and writer
- Joe Winkler – football player
- Doc Young – Hammond physician, one of the founders of the National Football League
- Harry Yourell – Illinois state representative and businessman
- Mike Inik – mass shooter
- Aminah Nieves – actress
