= Jason Johnson (wide receiver) =

American football player (born 1965)

No. 87, 88, 85
- Position: Wide receiver

Personal information
- Born: November 8, 1965 (age 60); Gary, Indiana, U.S.
- Listed height: 5 ft 10 in (1.78 m)
- Listed weight: 178 lb (81 kg)

Career information
- High school: West Side (Gary)
- College: Illinois State (1984–1987)
- NFL draft: 1988: undrafted

Career history
- Denver Broncos (1988); Pittsburgh Steelers (1989); Denver Broncos (1990)*; Frankfurt Galaxy (1991); New Orleans Saints (1991); Frankfurt Galaxy (1992)
- * Offseason or practice squad member only

Career NFL statistics
- Receptions: 1
- Receiving yards: 6
- Return yards: 362
- Stats at Pro Football Reference

Jason Mansfield Johnson (born November 8, 1965) is an American former professional football player who was a wide receiver for two seasons in the National Football League (NFL) with the Denver Broncos and Pittsburgh Steelers. He played college football for the Illinois State Redbirds. He also played for the Frankfurt Galaxy of the World League of American Football (WLAF).

== Early life and college ==
Jason Mansfield Johnson was born on November 8, 1965, in Gary, Indiana. He attended West Side High School in Gary.

Johnson was a four-year letterman for the Illinois State Redbirds of Illinois State University from 1984 to 1987. He later returned to school and graduated in December 1995.

== Professional career ==
After going undrafted in the 1988 NFL draft, Johnson signed with the Denver Broncos on April 27, 1988. He was placed on injured reserve on August 22 and was activated on October 27, 1988. He played in eight games for the Broncos during the 1988 season, totaling one catch for six yards, one carry for three yards, 14 kick returns for 292 yards, one punt return for five yards, one fumble, and one fumble recovery. Johnson became a free agent after the season.

Johnson was signed by the Pittsburgh Steelers on March 16, 1989. He appeared in 14 games in 1989, recording three kick returns for 43 yards, two punt returns for 22 yards, one fumble and one fumble recovery. He became a free agent again after the 1989 season.

Johnson signed with the Denver Broncos on March 28, 1990. He was released on September 3, 1990.

Johnson played in all ten games, starting nine, for the Frankfurt Galaxy of the World League of American Football in 1991, catching 38 passes for 635 yards and four touchdowns. The Galaxy finished the season with a 7–3 record but did not make the playoffs as they were 3rd in the European Division behind the London Monarchs (9–1) and Barcelona Dragons (8–2).

Johnson was signed by the New Orleans Saints on July 17, 1991. He was placed on injured reserve on July 29, 1991.

Johnson returned to the Galaxy in 1992 and caught 22 passes for 268 yards and one touchdown that year.

== Coaching career ==
Johnson was the head coach at his alma mater, West Side, from 2011 to 2017. He coached his son Jon'Vea Johnson while at West Side.
