= Calumet High School =

Calumet High School may refer to:

- Calumet High School (Calumet, Michigan)
- Calumet High School (Calumet, Oklahoma), Calumet, Oklahoma
- Calumet High School (Chicago), a former high school that opened in 1889 and closed in 2006
- Calumet High School (Gary, Indiana)
