= Wheeler, Indiana =

- Census-designated place
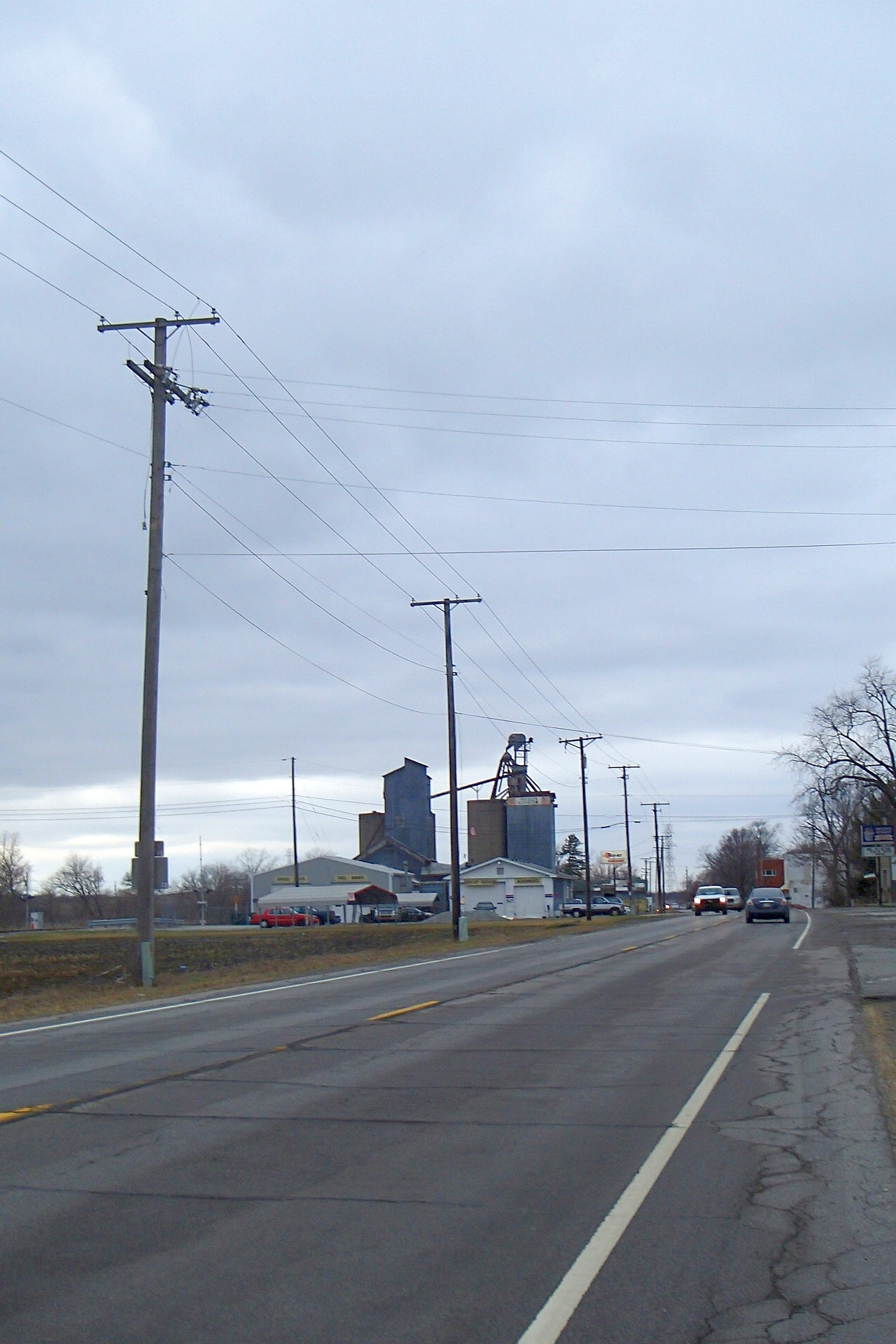

- Location of Wheeler in Porter County, Indiana.
- Coordinates: 41°30′20″N 87°10′32″W
- Country: United States
- State: Indiana
- County: Porter
- Township: Union

Area
  - Total: 2.66 sq mi (6.88 km^{2})
  - Land: 2.66 sq mi (6.88 km^{2})
  - Water: 0 sq mi (0.00 km^{2})
- Elevation: 676 ft (206 m)

Population (2020)
  - Total: 435
  - Density: 163.8/sq mi (63.24/km^{2})
- Time zone: UTC-6 (Central (CST))
  - Summer (DST): UTC-5 (CDT)
- ZIP code: 46393
- Area code: 219
- GNIS feature ID: 2629887
- FIPS code: 18-83600

Wheeler is an unincorporated census-designated place (CDP) in northern Union Township, Porter County, in the U.S. state of Indiana. It lies along State Road 130, northwest of the city of Valparaiso. Although Wheeler is unincorporated, it had a post office, with the ZIP code of 46393. As of the 2020 census, Wheeler had a population of 435.

== History ==
Wheeler was founded in 1858 when the railroad was extended to that point. A post office was in operation at Wheeler from 1858 to July 2023.

== Demographics ==
Historical population
Census	Pop.	Note	%±
2010	443		—
2020	435		−1.8%
U.S. Decennial Census

The population at the 2010 census was 443. There were 214 males (48.4%) and 229 females (51.6%). The median resident age is 48.5 in Wheeler compared to the median age of 37.7 in Indiana. The estimated median household income in 2017 was $65,747 In Wheeler compared to $54,181 in Indiana. The estimated per capita income in 2017 was $32,521. The percentage of residents living in poverty in 2017 was 3%.

== Education ==
Wheeler is served by the Union Township School Corporation, which includes Wheeler High School, Union Township Middle School, and two elementary schools. Wheeler today is still part of Union Township and has remained as the largest community in the township by population.
