= SCEC =

SCEC can mean:

- Saskatchewan Co-operative Elevator Company
- School City of East Chicago
- Southern California Earthquake Center
- Sydney Convention and Exhibition Centre, an exhibition space in Sydney, Australia
