= Greater South Shore Athletic Conference (IHSAA) =

High school athletic conference in Indiana

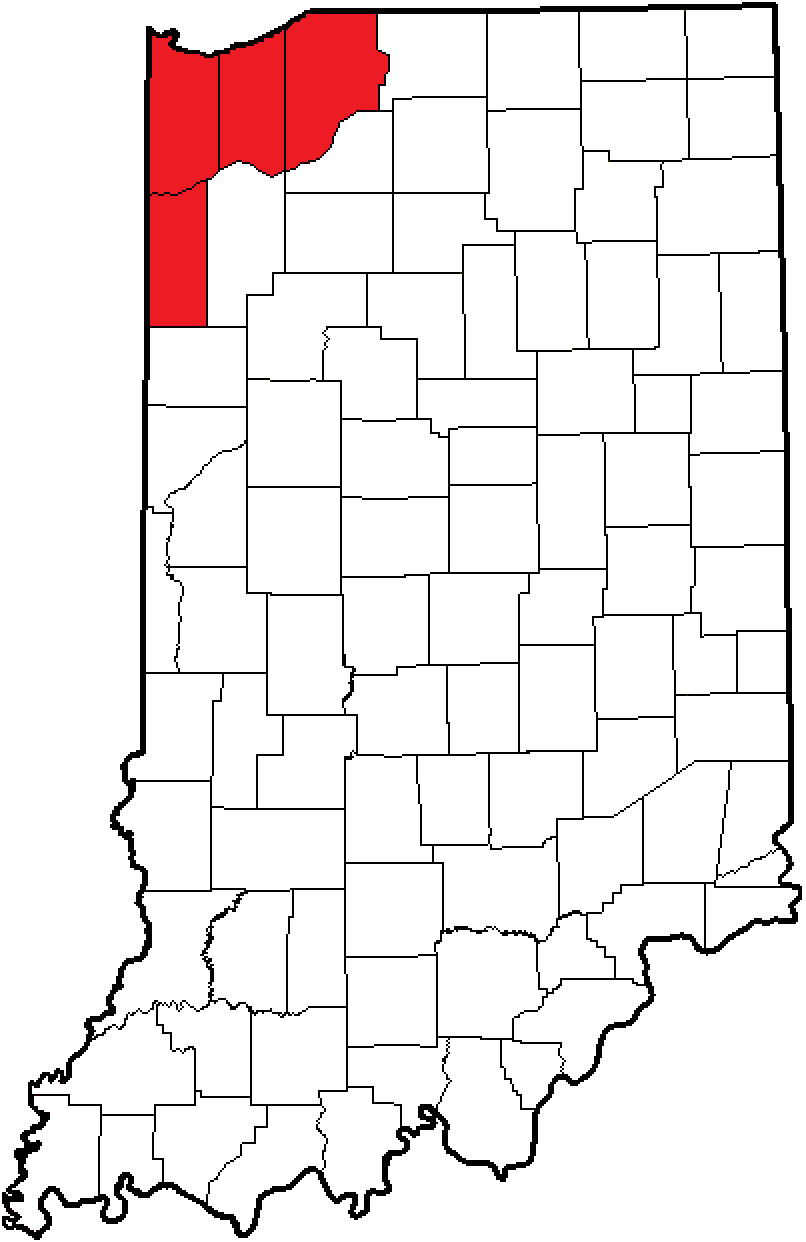
The Greater South Shore Conference in Indiana

The Greater South Shore Conference is an eight-member Indiana High School Athletic Association athletic conference spanning Lake and Porter counties in Northwest Indiana. Two other members, Boone Grove and Gary West Side, participate only in football, with Boone Grove otherwise participating in the Porter County Conference and Gary West Side otherwise participating in the Great Lakes Athletic Conference.

Hanover Central High School joined the conference in 2013, Griffith High School joined the conference in 2017, and Illiana Christian High School joined the conference in 2021. Marquette Catholic High School and North Newton High School left the conference concurrent with Griffith joining, with Marquette becoming an independent and North Newton joining the Midwest Conference. The conference has two divisions for football, with the North Division including Boone Grove, Hammond Bishop Noll, Lake Station Edison and Whiting, and the South Division including Calumet, Gary West Side, Griffith, River Forest and Wheeler. Illiana Christian does not have a football team.

Due to continued rapid growth, Hanover Central left the conference in 2023 to join the Northwest Crossroads Conference. Gary West Side joined as a football-only member upon Hanover Central's departure. Illiana Christian, also growing quickly, has announced its intention to leave the conference in 2026 to join the Northwest Crossroads Conference.

In 2026–2027, Boone Grove Girls Tennis will join the Greater South Shore Conference.

== Membership ==
School	City	County	Team name	Colors	Enrollment 24–25	IHSAA Class Football	Year joined	Previous conference
Calumet	Gary	45; Lake	Warriors		662	3A; 3A	2007	
Hammond Noll	Hammond	45; Lake	Warriors		617	3A; 3A	2007	Lake
Illiana Christian	St. John	45; Lake	Vikings		544	3A; N/A	2021	Independents
Lake Station Edison	Lake Station	45; Lake	Fighting Eagles		391	2A; 2A	2007	
River Forest	Hobart Township	45; Lake	Ingots		567	3A; 3A	2007	
Wheeler	Union Township	64; Porter	Bearcats		417	2A; 2A	2007	
Boone Grove^{1}	Valparaiso	64; Porter	Wolves		466	2A; 2A		
Griffith	Griffith	45; Lake	Panthers		637	3A; 3A	2017	
Whiting	Whiting	45; Lake	Oilers		422	2A; 2A	2007	

1. Football and Tennis Only

=== Former members ===
School	Location	Mascot	Colors	IHSAA Class	# / County	Year joined	Previous Conference	Year left	Conference Joined
Hanover; Central High School	Cedar Lake	Wildcats		3A; 3A	64; Porter	2013	Porter County	2023	Northwest Crossroads Conference
Marquette Catholic^{1}	Michigan City	Blazers		A N/A	46; LaPorte	2007	Northland	2017	Independents
North Newton	Morocco	Spartans		A A	56; Newton	2007	Independents (NWHC 1998)	2017	Independents (MWC 2018)

=== Football divisions ===
North	South
Hammond; Bishop Noll	Calumet
Boone Grove	Griffith
Lake Station; Edison	River Forest
Whiting	Gary West Side
	Wheeler

== Conference championships ==
=== Football ===
#	Team	Seasons
9	Wheeler	2007, 2008, 2009, 2010, 2011, 2014 (S) 2015 (S), 2023 (S), 2024 (S)
7	Whiting	2012, 2013, 2014 (N), 2015 (N), 2016 (N), 2017 (N), 2018 (N)
3	Griffith	2017 (S), 2018 (S), 2020 (S)
3	Boone Grove	2019 (S), 2023 (N), 2024 (N)
3	Hanover Central	2016 (S), 2021 (S), 2022 (S)
2	River Forest	2020 (N), 2022 (N)
1	Calumet	2019 (N)
1	South Central (UM)	2021 (N)
0	Hammond Bishop Noll	
0	Lake Station Edison	
0	North Newton	

- N- North Division, S- South Division.

=== Boys basketball ===
#	Team	Seasons
7	Hammond Bishop Noll	2011, 2012, 2013, 2018*, 2024, 2025, 2026
4	Marquette Catholic	2014, 2015, 2016, 2017*
3	Wheeler	2009, 2010, 2017*
2	Calumet	2008, 2019
2	Hanover Central	2020, 2021
2	Lake Station Edison	2018*, 2023
1	Illiana Christian	2022
0	Griffith	
0	North Newton	
0	River Forest	
0	Whiting	

=== Girls basketball ===
#	Team	Seasons
9	Hammond Bishop Noll	2013, 2014, 2015, 2016, 2017, 2018, 2019, 2021, 2022*
4	Calumet	2008, 2009, 2010, 2011
4	Lake Station Edison	2020, 2022*, 2023, 2024
1	River Forest	2025
1	Whiting	2012
0	Griffith	
0	Hanover Central	
0	Illiana Christian	
0	Marquette Catholic	
0	North Newton	
0	Wheeler	

== State champions ==
=== Bishop Noll Warriors (6) ===
- 1968 Baseball
- 1981 Boys Swimming & Diving
- 1984 Boys Swimming & Diving
- 1989 Football (3A)
- 2004 Baseball (2A)
- 2018 Soccer (2A)

=== Marquette Catholic Blazers ( 11 ) ===
- 1999 Volleyball (A)
- 2000 Volleyball (A)
- 2001 Volleyball (A)
- 2004 Volleyball (A)
- 2005 Volleyball (A)
- 2006 Volleyball (A)
- 2007 Volleyball (A)
- 2008 Volleyball (A)
- 2014 Boys Basketball (A)
- 2018 Girls Basketball (A)
- 2019 Girls Basketball (A)

=== Wheeler High School (2) ===
- 2010 Boys Basketball (2A)
- 2010 Softball (2A)

=== Calumet Warriors (1) ===
- 1965 Boys Cross-Country

=== Illiana Christian Vikings (2) ===
- 2022 Baseball (2A)
- 2023 Baseball (2A)

== Resources ==
- IHSAA Conferences
- IHSAA Directory
- IHSAA State Champions
- IHSAA Classification
- IHSAA Football Classification
