= Wake Forest Department of Theatre and Dance =

University unit in Winston-Salem, North Carolina, US

- Type: Private
- Established: 1942
- Faculty: 10 full-time Theatre faculty and 6 full-time Dance faculty; 8 full-time Staff
- Location: Winston-Salem, North Carolina, United States
- Website: theatre.wfu.edu

The Wake Forest University Department of Theatre and Dance is a department within Wake Forest University which offers students a BA major in Theatre and a minor in Dance or in Theatre. The Department mounts four theatre productions, two dance concerts, and a varying number of student productions each season. The Department is housed in the Scales Fine Arts Center. The Theatre wing of Scales has two theatre spaces: the 200+-seat, Jo Mielziner-designed, proscenium theatre, the Harold C. Tedford Mainstage, and the intimate 100-something seat thrust stage, The Ring.

== Programs of instruction ==
=== Theatre ===
Students who choose to major in theatre are required to take courses in a variety of subjects such as Acting, Voice and Movement, Design & Production, Directing, various upper-level design courses, Dramatic Literature, and History of Western Theatre. While a specific academic "track" of performance, or design, or technical theatre is not a requirement of the program, students who are interested in specific careers in the field are able to take specialized courses and independent studies, to hone specific skills. Students who choose to minor in theatre are required to take 20 credit hours. Students have gone on to careers in acting and directing. According to director J. E. R. Friedenberg, the program can teach techniques, tools, processes, and provide opportunities to practice the craft of acting and directing in an environment with constructive feedback.

=== Dance ===
Dance is offered as an academic minor subject. Courses are open to all students and include Dance Composition, Ballet, Tap, Jazz, History of Dance, Improvisation, Social Dance, and Design & Production for Dance. Student dancers can also audition for the Wake Forest Dance Company, which produces two dance concerts every year. The company is composed of dancers with a variety of dance backgrounds and styles including ballet, jazz, modern, tap, and hip-hop. The dance concerts are exclusively cast from members of the Dance Company. The Fall Dance Concert is choreographed by faculty and professional guest artists, while the Spring Dance Concert is choreographed by student choreographers.

== University Theatre ==
University Theatre has been offering plays and musicals since 1942. In the first decade of the twenty-first century, there have been four main productions during each annual school season, and feature musicals, comedies, drama and tragedies.

Many productions combine skills from theatre and dance professors and tackle sometimes unusual projects. For example, the production Sonnets for an Old Century featured "newly dead" persons in an airy space who were encouraged by the "experienced dead" to make a statement to the world, and to relate stories of their lives. In the Wake Forest production of Smash, a socialist millionaire infiltrates an upper-class school for girls to try to plant the seed of socialism into their young minds since they may become "future cabinet ministers", but the comedy erupts into love triangles, mistaken identities, and light-hearted look at Karl Marx and Friedrich Engels. The play Three Penny Opera was first performed in Germany in 1928, and it needed minor adjustments to make it work for modern audiences, such as modeling the character Peachum on Bernie Madoff:

I've updated it a little for American audiences ... in terms of making sure any of the British references were references we would clearly recognize, like Soho versus Highgate, perhaps ... I'm just trying to put (the story) into a context where they realize that the issues of corruption, and of power corrupting, are still very current, very prevalent.

— Director J. E. R. Friedenberg in the Winston-Salem Journal, 2010

Theatre productions have won positive reviews. Sonnets for an Old Century won plaudits for having a "strong ensemble performances". Friedenberg's production of Three Penny Opera kept the audience "fully engaged" including "more-than-risqué costumes" and excellent music, according to one report. The production of John Steinbeck's The Grapes of Wrath in 2011 was praised for its "stagecraft" and was described as an "ambitious and admirable" take on "challenging material." The production of Eurydice was described as a "crazy salad of ideas about music, words, living in the present and remembering the past." Directing, according to Friedenberg, is not about multitasking but rather having the "experience and context to be able to figure out which tree needs attention when you look at the forest." It is a process of breaking down complex productions into smaller steps and approaching them in the right order. He added "I think the most important part of the learning curve is to trust yourself, to know your team and how they work, and to know when to push and when to wait." In 2011, Friedenberg recruited playwright John Cariani and star of the TV show Law & Order to work with Wake Forest theater students during their dress rehearsal phase of Cariani's play Almost, Maine.

== Student groups ==
The Department is the home of many theatre student groups. The most active is the service organization, the Anthony Aston Players, which supports the Department productions, produces their own plays and performances, and engages in campus-wide service and charitable events such as Project Pumpkin and Hit the Bricks. Other groups include the Chinese Theatre group, BiMoo, a student comedy troupe known as the Lilting Banshees, and a multicultural theatre ensemble known as Umoja. Student dance groups include the hip-hop dance club, Momentum Crew.

== Productions ==
Theatre productions at Wake Forest 2000–2010
Date	Production	Director	Notes
2012-11-03	As You Like It	Sharon Andrews	
2011-10-28	Almost, Maine	J. E. R. Friedenberg	
2009-09-25	Doubt	Brook Davis	
2009-10-30	Sonnets for an Old Century	Cindy Gendrich & Christina Soriano	
2010-02-19	The Threepenny Opera	J. E. R. Friedenberg	
2010-04-09	Moonchildren	Sharon Andrews	
2008-09-26	Intimate Apparel	J. K. Curry	
2008-10-31	All My Sons	Sharon Andrews	
2009-02-13	The Underpants	J. E. R. Friedenberg	
2009-04-03	King Lear	Cindy Gendrich	
2007-09-28	Machinal	Brook Davis	
2007-11-02	Twelve Angry Men	J. E. R. Friedenberg	
2008-02-21	Wings	Cindy Gendrich	
2008-04-05	The Gondoliers	James Dodding	
2006-09-22	An Enemy of the People	Brook Davis	
2006-10-27	Nathan the Wise	J. K. Curry	
2007-02-16	Psycho Beach Party	Cindy Gendrich	
2007-04-06	Romeo & Juliet	Sharon Andrews	
2005-09-23	Hay Fever	Cindy Gendrich	
2005-10-28	Marvin's Room	Ray Collins	
2006-02-10	Gint	Sharon Andrews	
2006-03-31	Kiss Me Kate	J. E. R. Friedenberg	
2004-04-25	The Secret Rapture	Brook Davis	
2004-10-29	Catch-22	Sharon Andrews	
2005-02-11	Antigone	Cindy Gendrich	
2005-04-01	Twelfth Night	J. E. R. Friedenberg	
2003-09-26	Angels in America	Brook Davis	
2003-10-31	Goodnight Desdemona	J. K. Curry	
2004-02-13	Monkey Business	Sharon Andrews	
2004-04-02	Into The Woods	Cindy Gendrich	
2002-10-02	The Marriage of Bette & Boo	Cindy Gendrich	
2002-11-06	The Cherry Orchard	J. E. R. Friedenberg	
2003-02-19	Vieux Carre	Sharon Andrews	
2003-04-04	The Servant of Two Masters	James Dodding	
2001-10-03	The House of Blue Leaves	J. K. Curry	
2001-11-07	A Midsummer Night's Dream	Sharon Andrews	
2002-02-20	A Lie of the Mind	Cindy Gendrich	
2002-04-12	The Secret Garden	Brook Davis	
2000-09-29	Lysistrata	J. E. R. Friedenberg	
2000-11-03	Biedermann and the Firebugs	Brook Davis	
2001-02-16	Off the Map	Cynthia Gendrich	
2001-04-06	School for Scandal	Sharon Andrews	

Source: University Theatre Production Archives

== Notable alumni ==
- Branden Cook, actor, Masters of the Air, Chicago P.D.
- Michael Baron, Artistic Director at Lyric Theatre of Oklahoma in Oklahoma City.
- Kate Lambert, actor, Teachers, Tab Time, Reno 911!
- Mara McCaffray, actor, The Young and the Restless, Just Add Magic
- Curt Beech, art director for 2009 film Star Trek
- Allyson Currin, playwright
- Cary Donaldson, actor, appeared in Merchant of Venice with Al Pacino.
- Drew Droege, actor, appeared in various films, television shows, and the Chloe web series
- Marc Palmieri, playwright, actor, screenwriter (graduated 1994)
- Kate Roberts, actress, appeared in Broadway show of Bloody Bloody Andrew Jackson
