= Griffith High School (Indiana) =

Location
- 600 North Wiggs Street; Griffith, Lake County, Indiana 46319; United States
- 41°31′53″N 87°26′15″W

Information
- Type: Public high school
- School district: Griffith Public Schools
- Principal: Jonathon Chance
- Teaching staff: 70.00 (FTE)
- Grades: 9-12
- Gender: Coeducational
- Enrollment: 1,090 (2023-2024)
- Student to teacher ratio: 15.57
- Colors: Black and gold
- Athletics conference: Northwest Crossroads Conference
- Team name: Panthers
- Rivals: Calumet High School; Munster High School; Highland High School
- Website: Official website

Griffith High School is a public high school located in Griffith, Indiana. It is the sole comprehensive high school of the Griffith Public Schools, which includes the majority of Griffith.

== About ==
Griffith High School was founded in the mid-1900s after the space at the former high school became overcrowded.

== Demographics ==
The demographic breakdown of the 901 students enrolled for the 2012–2013 school year was:

- Male - 47.4%
- Female - 52.6%
- Native American/Alaskan - 0.2%
- Asian/Pacific islander - 1.2%
- Black - 20.6%
- Hispanic - 23.4%
- White - 53.3%
- Multiracial - 1.3%

In addition, 45.6% of the students qualified for free or reduced lunch.

== Athletics ==
Griffith is part of the Northwest Crossroads Conference. They compete under the name "Panthers" and the school colors are black and gold. The following sports are offered at Griffith:

- Baseball (boys)
- Basketball
- Cross country
- Football (boys)
  - State champions - 1997
- Golf
- Gymnastics (girls)
- Soccer
- Softball (girls)
- Swimming
- Tennis
- Track
- Volleyball (girls)
- Wrestling (boys)

== Notable alumni ==
- Kody Hoese, Class of 2016, baseball player in the Los Angeles Dodgers organization

== Image gallery ==
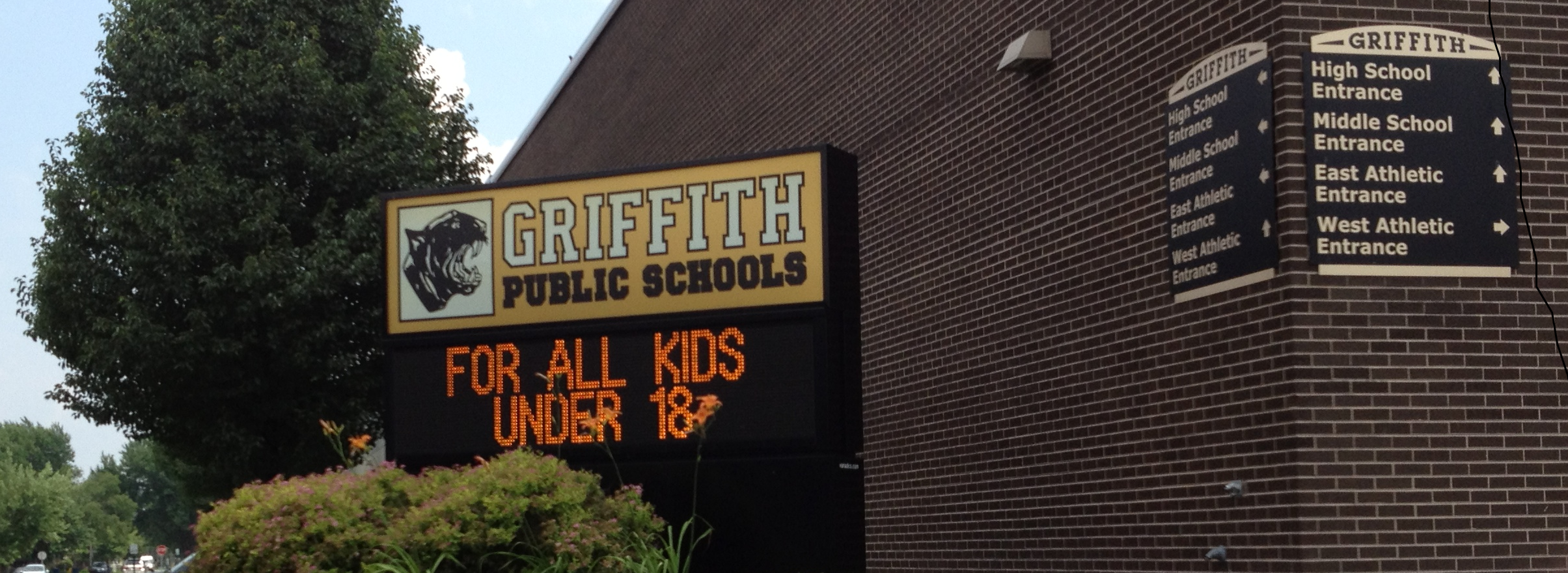
Griffith High School

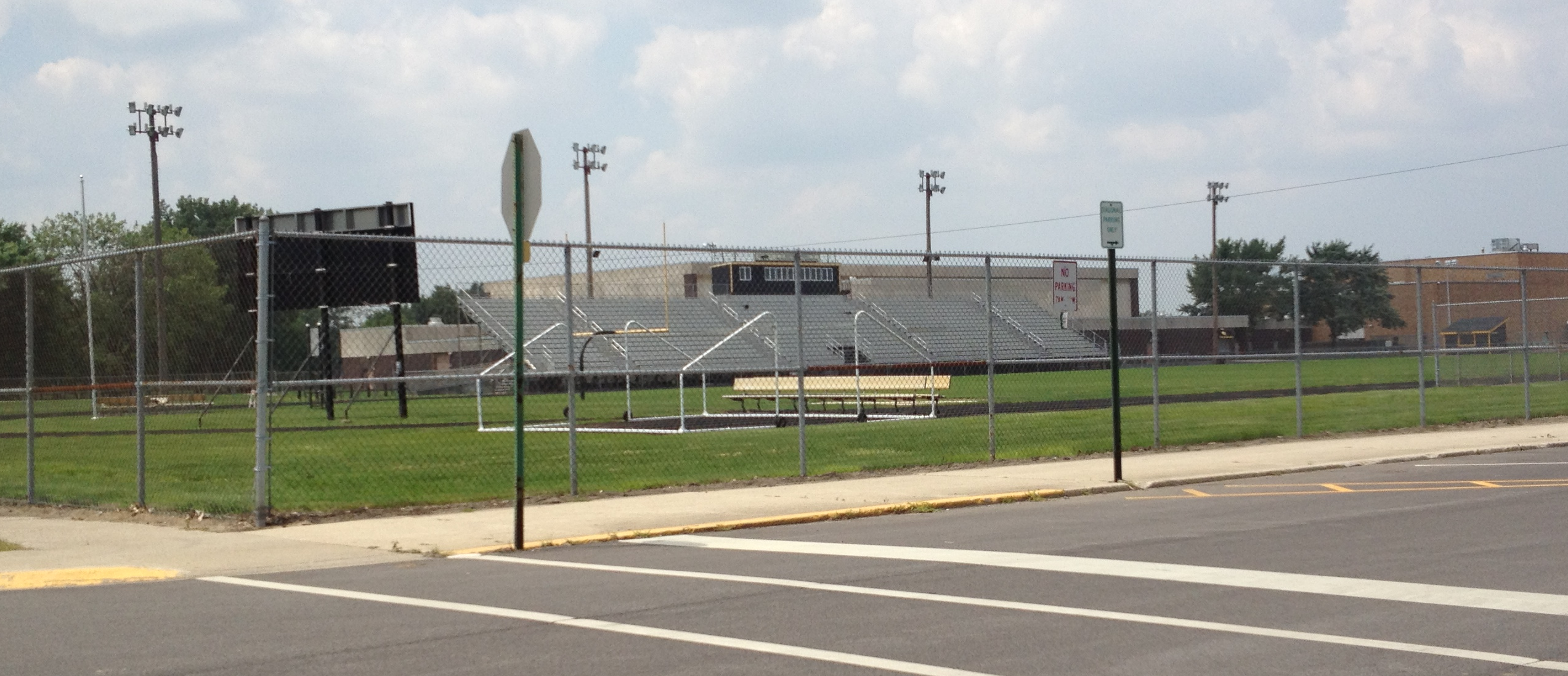
Griffith High School Football Field

== See also ==
- List of high schools in Indiana
