= Kody Hoese =

American baseball player (born 1997)

- Third baseman
- Born: July 13, 1997 (age 29); Merrillville, Indiana, U.S.
- Bats: Right Throws: Right
- Stats at Baseball Reference

Kody Michael Hoese (born July 13, 1997) is an American former professional baseball third baseman.

== Amateur career ==
Hoese attended Griffith High School in Griffith, Indiana. As a senior, he hit .388 with four home runs and 29 RBIs. Undrafted out of high school in the 2016 MLB draft, he enrolled at Tulane University to play college baseball for the Tulane Green Wave.

In 2017, as a freshman at Tulane, Hoese hit .213 with zero home runs and 10 RBIs in 44 games. As a sophomore in 2018, he started all 58 of Tulane's games at third base and batted .291 with five home runs and 31 RBIs. He was drafted by the Kansas City Royals in the 35th round of the 2018 MLB draft, but did not sign. After the season, he played in the New England Collegiate Baseball League for the Newport Gulls, hitting .283 with seven home runs and 25 RBIs in 38 games. In 2019, Hoese's junior year, he hit .391 with 23 home runs and sixty RBIs in 56 games and was named the American Athletic Conference Player of the Year.

== Professional career ==
Hoese was selected by the Los Angeles Dodgers in the first round of the 2019 Major League Baseball draft with the 25th overall pick. He signed for $2.74 million and made his professional debut on June 17, 2019, with the Rookie-level Arizona League Dodgers. He had three hits, all doubles, in three at-bats in that game. After 19 games in the Arizona League, he was promoted to the Great Lakes Loons of the Single-A Midwest League in July, with whom he finished the season. Over 41 games between the two clubs, Hoese slashed .299/.380/.483 with five home runs and 29 RBI. Hoese did not play in a game in 2020 due to the cancellation of the minor league season because of the COVID-19 pandemic.

For the 2021 season, Hoese was assigned to the Tulsa Drillers of the Double-A Central, slashing .188/.241/.245 with two home runs and 17 RBI over 59 games. He missed two months during the season due to injury. He was selected to play in the Arizona Fall League for the Glendale Desert Dogs after the season. He returned to Tulsa to begin the 2022 season. In late May, he was placed on the injured list with a groin injury before being activated in late June. He played in 77 games for the Drillers, hitting .232 with five home runs and 34 RBIs. In 2023, he spent the whole season with Tulsa, playing in a career high 98 games with a .244 batting average, 11 homers and 36 RBI.

Hoese was promoted to the Triple–A Oklahoma City Baseball Club for the 2024 season, where he played in 127 games and batted .287 with 17 home runs and 79 RBI. He remained with Oklahoma City in 2025, played in 99 games, and batted .264 with eight home runs and 51 RBI. Hoese elected free agency following the season on November 6, 2025.

== Post-playing career ==
After not signing a professional contract for 2026, Hoese was hired as the Assistant Athletic Director at his former high school, Griffith High School in Indiana.
