= Griffith Public Schools =

School district in Indiana

Location
- 602 N Raymond; Griffith, Indiana 46319 United States

District information
- Grades: K-12
- Established: 1907
- Superintendent: Leah Dumezich
- Schools: 3

Students and staff
- Students: 1,148

Other information
- Website: https://www.griffithps.org/

Griffith Public Schools is a school district in Lake County, Indiana.

The majority of Griffith is covered by this school district.

== Schools ==
- Griffith High School
- Wadsworth Elementary School
- Beiriger Elementary School
- Griffith Middle School
