= Kawann Short =

American football player (born 1989)

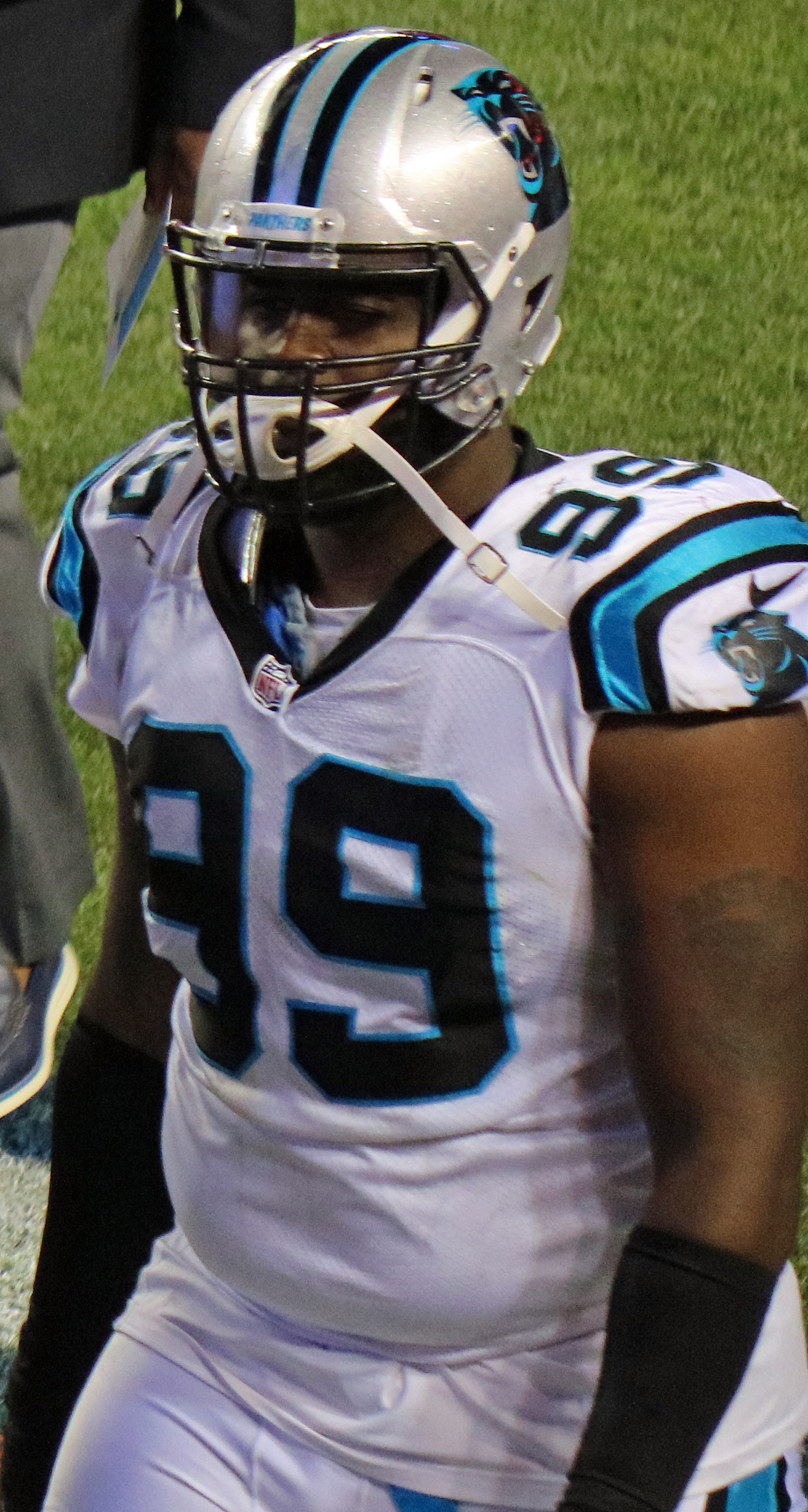
- Short with the Carolina Panthers in 2016

No. 99
- Position: Defensive tackle

Personal information
- Born: February 2, 1989 (age 37); East Chicago, Indiana, U.S.
- Listed height: 6 ft 3 in (1.91 m)
- Listed weight: 315 lb (143 kg)

Career information
- High school: Central (East Chicago)
- College: Purdue (2008–2012)
- NFL draft: 2013: 2nd round, 44th overall pick

Career history
- Carolina Panthers (2013–2020)

Awards and highlights
- Second-team All-Pro (2015); 2× Pro Bowl (2015, 2018); PFWA All-Rookie Team (2013); Second-team All-American (2012); 2× First-team All-Big Ten (2011, 2012); Little Caesars Pizza Bowl champion (2011); Second-team All-Big Ten (2010)

Career NFL statistics
- Total tackles: 280
- Sacks: 32.5
- Forced fumbles: 9
- Fumble recoveries: 6
- Stats at Pro Football Reference

Kawann Arcell Short (born February 2, 1989) is an American former professional football player who was a defensive tackle for the Carolina Panthers of the National Football League (NFL). He played college football for the Purdue Boilermakers. He was selected by the Panthers in the second round of the 2013 NFL draft.

== Early life ==
Short was born in East Chicago, Indiana. He went to Central High School in East Chicago. There, he was a two-sport athlete playing both football and basketball. He was a high school teammate of E'Twaun Moore during basketball season, and the two led the Cardinals to the Indiana class 4A state title in 2007.

Short was rated as a three-star recruit and was rated the number 24 defensive tackle nationally by Scout.com. As a junior, Short recorded 80 tackles, 15 tackles for loss, and 8.5 sacks. As a senior, he registered 85 tackles, 9 sacks, 2 fumble recoveries, and 2 blocked punts. He committed to Purdue University on April 13, 2007. He was not heavily recruited as he did not land a scholarship offer from any other Football Bowl Subdivision schools.

College recruiting
Name	Hometown	School	Height	Weight	40^{‡}	Commit date
Kawann Short; DT	East Chicago, Indiana	Central High School	6 ft 5 in (1.96 m)	270 lb (120 kg)	--	Sep 29, 2007
Kawann Short; DT	Recruit ratings: Scout: Rivals: 247Sports: (NR)					
Overall recruit ranking: Scout: 24 (DT) Rivals: 57 (DT), 6 (IN) ESPN: -- (DT)
Note: In many cases, Scout, Rivals, 247Sports, On3, and ESPN may conflict in their listings of height and weight.; In these cases, the average was taken. ESPN grades are on a 100-point scale.; Sources: "Purdue Football Commitment List (26)". Rivals.; "Purdue College Football Recruiting Commits". Scout.; "ESPN". ESPN.; "Scout.com Team Recruiting Rankings". Scout.; "2008 Team Ranking". Rivals.com.

== College career ==
Short attended Purdue University, where he played for the Purdue Boilermakers football team from 2008 to 2012. In 2009, Short started all 12 games and recorded 48 tackles, 4 tackles for loss, and was second on the team with 2 interceptions. He received Purdue's Newcomer Award - Defense for spring practice, was named a freshman All American by CollegeFootballNews.com and was selected to the Big Ten All-Freshman team by the Sporting News. In 2010, Short finished fourth in the Big Ten in both sacks, with 6, and tackles for loss, with 12.5. He also led Purdue with 8 pass deflections, recorded 41 tackles, and blocked 2 kicks. He was named second-team All-Big Ten by the media. In 2011, Short was voted a captain by his teammates and started all 13 games. He finished with career highs of 54 tackles, 17 tackles for loss, and 6.5 sacks. He was able to record a tackle for loss in 10 of the 13 games he played. He also registered 1 forced fumble, 1 fumble recovery, 2 pass deflections, and blocked 2 kicks. In an overtime win against Ohio State, Short was named the Walter Camp National and Big 10 Defensive Player of the week after finishing with 3 sacks. He was named Purdue's defensive MVP was named first-team All-Big Ten by the media and second-team All-Big Ten by the coaches.

He was a first-team All-Big Ten Conference selection in 2011 and 2012, and received second-team All-American honors from the Associated Press in 2012.

== Professional career ==
=== Pre-draft ===
Prior to the 2013 NFL draft, Short was a projected to be a potential first-round pick. He was rated as the seventh-best defensive tackle in the draft by NFLDraftScout.com. Short was invited to the Senior Bowl where he tallied 3 tackles and 1 tackle for loss and earned MVP honors for the North team.

Short was invited to the 2013 NFL Scouting Combine in Indianapolis, which started on February 23–26, along with teammate Josh Johnson. Short chose Joel Segal of Lagardère Unlimited as his agent. When the NFL Combine approached, Short determined that he was not healthy enough to participate in the event, citing a bad hamstring.

At Purdue's Pro Day on March 1, Short sat the event out as he was still nursing his hamstring.

Purdue held a second Pro Day workout on March 25 just for Short.

Pre-draft measurables
Height	Weight	Arm length	Hand span	40-yard dash	20-yard shuttle	Three-cone drill	Vertical jump	Broad jump	Bench press
6 ft 2 7/8 in (1.90 m)	299 lb (136 kg)	34 3/4 in (0.88 m)	9 3/4 in (0.25 m)	5.08 s	4.65 s	7.55 s	27 in (0.69 m)	8 ft 4 in (2.54 m)	29 reps
All values from NFL Combine/Purdue's Pro Day

=== 2013 ===
Short was selected in the second round with the 44th overall pick by the Carolina Panthers in the 2013 NFL draft. On May 22, 2013, Short signed a four-year $4.63 million deal. In his rookie year, Short played in all 16 regular season games. He recorded 30 tackles, 1 forced fumble, 1.5 sacks, and tied for second on the team with 21 quarterback pressures. He also finished tenth in the NFL in pass rush productivity among interior defenders, leading all rookies, and 16th in the NFL in run stop percentage. The Panthers finished first in the NFL with 60 sacks in 2013, second in points per game, and third in DVOA team defense. He was named to the All-Rookie Teams by PFF, ESPN, and SB Nation. He was named to the PFWA All-Rookie Team.

=== 2014 ===
In his season debut performance against the Tampa Bay Buccaneers, Short picked up where he left off from his strong rookie season, recording 1 quarterback hit, 1 quarterback hurry, 2 tackles-for-loss, 5 tackles, and 5 stops. Short currently ranks in the top 10 defensive tackles in the NFL in pass rush productivity. Through the first three weeks, of the season, PFF ranked Short as the 2nd best defensive tackle in the NFL. Through the first four weeks of the season, Short ranked third amongst defensive tackles in run stop percentage, bringing the runner down on 14.6% of snaps. During the Panthers week 5 victory over the Chicago Bears, Short recorded his first sack of the season against Jay Cutler in the final drive of the game, effectively sealing the victory for the Panthers. Through the six weeks of the season, PFF rated Short as the second best defensive tackle in the NFL behind only Gerald McCoy. During the Panthers wildcard playoff victory over the Arizona Cardinals, Short recorded his first career playoff sack against Ryan Lindley.

=== 2015 ===
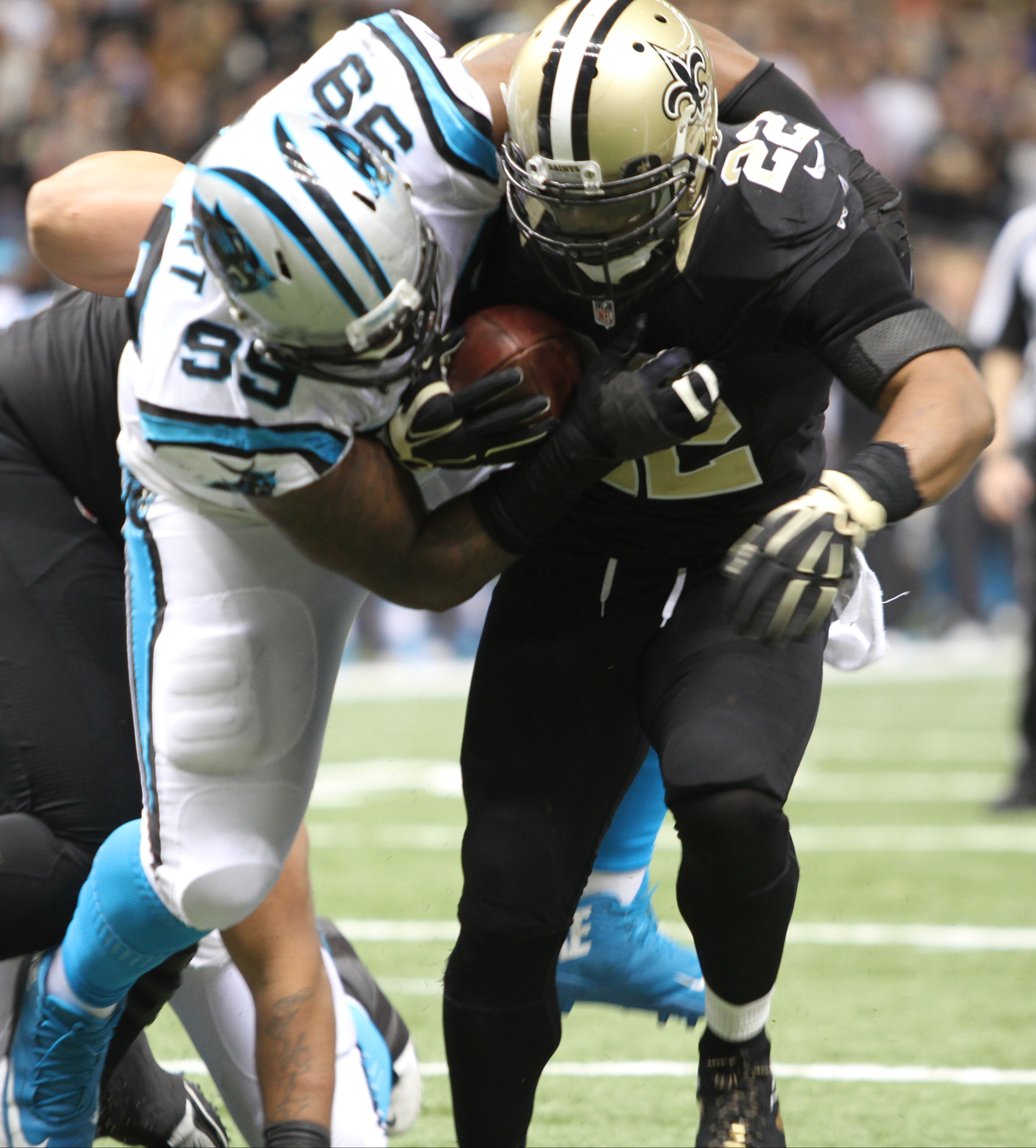
Short tackling New Orleans Saints running back Mark Ingram II in 2015.

Short's preseason was hindered by back spasms that kept him out of two preseason games. During the final preseason game, he recorded a sack against Pittsburgh Steelers quarterback Michael Vick. During the Panthers week 2 victory over the Houston Texans, Short recorded two quarterback hits, four quarterback hurries, and forced a key intentional grounding penalty on quarterback Ryan Mallett during the Texans' final drive. In a week 3 victory over the New Orleans Saints, Short recorded 2 quarterback hurries. Through the first four games, Short ranked 2nd on the Panthers with 5 quarterback hurries and rated as PFF's 11th best defensive tackle in the NFL. During the Panthers victory in their next game over the Seattle Seahawks in Seattle, Short was dominant, registering 6 total pressures (two sacks, a quarterback hit, and three hurries of Russell Wilson), a batted pass, three defensive stops, and two pass rush wins where the pass was away before he could register pressure. He was awarded NFC Defensive Player of The Week for his performance against Seattle.

Through the first seven weeks, Short graded as PFF's best defensive tackle in the NFL. Short was also named the NFC Defensive Player of the month for October, compiling 5 sacks for the month. During the Panthers 37–29 victory over the Green Bay Packers that helped the Panthers move to 8–0 in the first time in franchise history, Short recorded his career-high 6th sack of the season against quarterback Aaron Rodgers. Additionally, during Green Bay's last drive of the game, Short recorded a key quarterback pressure that led to the game-winning interception by Thomas Davis. The following week, during the Panthers 27–10 victory over the Tennessee Titans, Short recorded a key fumble recovery to end the Titans final drive. During the Panthers 41–37 victory over the New Orleans Saints to move them to 12–0, Short recorded his 7th sack of the season against quarterback Drew Brees, tying him with Kris Jenkins for most by a Panthers DT in a single season. The following week, during the Panthers 38–0 victory over the Atlanta Falcons, Short recorded another 2 sacks of quarterback Matt Ryan, setting the franchise record for the most sacks in a season for a Panthers' defensive tackle, and also recorded 2 forced fumbles.

Through 14 weeks of the NFL season, he led all defensive tackles in sacks. Short was selected for his first career Pro Bowl during the season. Short ended the regular season tied for the league lead in sacks among all defensive tackles. Short was awarded the NFC defensive player of the month for December, becoming the first defensive tackle to win Defensive Player of the Month twice in a single season in NFL history. Short was named to the AP All-Pro Second-team. Short finished the season with a career year. He had 55 tackles, 11 sacks, three forced fumbles, two fumble recoveries, and four passes defensed. The Panthers defeated both the Seahawks and the Cardinals to reach Super Bowl 50. In the game, Short and the Panthers fell to the Denver Broncos by a score of 24–10. According to PFF, Short's pass-rushing productivity of 11.2 was the third-highest among NFL defensive tackles. He was ranked 58th on the NFL Top 100 Players of 2016.

=== 2016–2020 ===
In 2016, Short started all 16 games for the Panthers, recording 55 tackles, 6 sacks, three passes defensed, and a forced fumble.

On February 27, 2017, the Panthers placed the franchise tag on Short. On April 17, 2017, Short signed a five-year, $80 million contract with the Panthers. He started all 16 games, recording 49 combined tackles, 7.5 sacks, and two forced fumbles.

In 2018, Short started 14 games, recording 42 combined tackles, three sacks, and a forced fumble.

On October 1, 2019, Short was placed on injured reserve with a partially torn rotator cuff.

On October 15, 2020, Short was placed on injured reserve after undergoing season-ending shoulder surgery. The Panthers released Short on February 16, 2021.

Following shoulder surgery, Short was cleared to return in July 2021.

== NFL career statistics ==
Legend
**Bold**	Career high

=== Regular season ===
Year	Team	Games		Tackles					Interceptions					Fumbles			
Year	Team	GP	GS	Cmb	Solo	Ast	Sck	TFL	Int	Yds	TD	Lng	PD	FF	FR	Yds	TD
2013	CAR	**16**	0	30	18	12	1.5	7	0	0	0	0	1	1	1	0	0
2014	CAR	**16**	9	39	20	19	3.5	4	0	0	0	0	2	1	**2**	0	0
2015	CAR	**16**	**16**	**55**	**36**	19	**11.0**	**16**	0	0	0	0	**4**	**3**	**2**	0	0
2016	CAR	**16**	**16**	**55**	30	**25**	6.0	12	0	0	0	0	3	1	0	0	0
2017	CAR	**16**	**16**	49	27	22	7.5	7	0	0	0	0	1	2	1	**11**	0
2018	CAR	14	14	42	29	13	3.0	12	0	0	0	0	1	1	0	0	0
2019	CAR	2	2	4	4	0	0.0	1	0	0	0	0	0	0	0	0	0
2020	CAR	3	3	6	3	3	0.0	0	0	0	0	0	0	0	0	0	0
Career		99	76	280	167	113	32.5	59	0	0	0	0	12	9	6	11	0

=== Playoffs ===
Year	Team	Games		Tackles					Interceptions					Fumbles			
Year	Team	GP	GS	Cmb	Solo	Ast	Sck	TFL	Int	Yds	TD	Lng	PD	FF	FR	Yds	TD
2013	CAR	1	0	**5**	1	**4**	0.0	0	0	0	0	0	0	0	0	0	0
2014	CAR	2	2	**5**	1	**4**	1.0	**1**	0	0	0	0	0	0	0	0	0
2015	CAR	**3**	**3**	**5**	**4**	1	**2.0**	**1**	0	0	0	0	0	**1**	0	0	0
2017	CAR	1	1	3	2	1	1.0	**1**	0	0	0	0	0	0	0	0	0
Career		7	6	18	8	10	4.0	3	0	0	0	0	0	1	0	0	0
