= Bobby Skafish =

American radio personality

Bobby Skafish (/ˈskeɪfɪʃ/ SKAY-fish) is a long-time radio personality in the Chicago area.

== Early life and education ==
Skafish was born in Indiana circa 1953/1954. (Note: Sources have said he was a native of Hammond, Crown Point, and East Chicago.) He has four older siblings. His father was a milkman and his mother was a part-time employee in school cafeterias. Skafish attended Gavit High School. He then attended Calumet College for a year before transferring to Indiana University Bloomington where, as a senior, he worked on the campus radio station.

== Career ==
Skafish began working as a disc jockey (DJ) on WWJY (WFLM at the time) in Crown Point, Indiana, then moved to WXRT in Chicago six months later where he became one of the best known radio personalities in Chicago. In 1983, he moved to WLUP (commonly called "the Loop").

At the Loop, Skafish called himself "Rob S." on the air. By 1990, Skafish was on the air for the afternoon drive and was considered one of the Loop's anchors.

In 1993, Skafish moved to WKQX, then to WXRT in 1994. In 1997, Skafish hosted and produced hundreds of original programs for WXRT to celebrate its 25th anniversary. WXRT released Skafish in 2006 in what it said was an effort to communicate to its listeners that the station is not "frozen in time".

Next, Skafish aired on WDRV as the afternoon personality from 2007 to 2015.

In 2016, Skafish published his book We Have Company: Four Decades of Rock and Roll Encounters.
