= George Rogers Clark Jr./Sr. High School =

Public high school in Whiting, Indiana, US

George Rogers Clark High School

Location
- 1921 Davis Avenue; Whiting, Indiana 46394; United States
- 41°40′42″N 87°30′25″W

Information
- Type: Public high school
- School district: School City of Hammond
- Superintendent: Scott Miller
- Principal: Dave Verta
- Teaching staff: 73.00 (on an FTE basis)
- Grades: 6–12
- Enrollment: 1,316 (2019–20)
- Student to teacher ratio: 18.03
- Colors: Royal blue and white
- Athletics conference: Great Lakes
- Nickname: Pioneers
- Website: www.hammond.k12.in.us/ClarkHS/

Clark High School was a public secondary school located in Whiting, Indiana. Clark served students in grades 6–12 in the School City of Hammond. Following the 2020–2021 school year, the school closed due to the consolidation of Hammond schools.

== Demographics ==
The demographic breakdown of the 1,342 students enrolled for 2017-18 was:

- Male - 51.6%
- Female - 48.4%
- Native American/Alaskan - 0.1%
- Asian - 0.2%
- Black - 11.6%
- Hispanic - 72.0%
- Native Hawaiian/Pacific islander - 0.1%
- White - 14.2%
- Multiracial - 1.8%

82.6% of the students were eligible for free or reduced-cost lunch. For 2017–18, Clark was a Title I school.

== Athletics ==
The Hammond Clark Pioneers compete in the Great Lakes Athletic Conference. School colors are royal blue and white. As of 2019–20, the following Indiana High School Athletic Association (IHSAA) sanctioned sports were offered:

- Baseball (boys)
- Basketball (girls and boys)
- Cross country (girls and boys)
- Football (boys)
- Soccer (girls and boys)
- Softball (girls)
- Swimming and diving (girls and boys)
- Tennis (girls)
- Track and field (girls and boys)
- Volleyball (girls)
- Wrestling (boys)
  - State champion - 1938

== See also ==
- List of high schools in Indiana
