= Hammond Central High School =

Public high school in Hammond, Indiana, US

Location
- 5926 Calumet Avenue; Hammond, Lake County, Indiana 46320; United States; 41°36′20″N 87°30′32″W

Information
- Type: Public high school
- Motto: Building Character, Leadership, Tradition
- Established: 1884
- School district: School City of Hammond
- Principal: Johnny Goodlow
- Teaching staff: 96.55 (FTE)
- Grades: 9–12
- Enrollment: 1,923 (2023-2024)
- Student to teacher ratio: 19.92
- Color
- Athletics conference: Great Lakes
- Mascot: Willy the Wildcat
- Team name: Wildcats
- Newspaper: The Hammond High Herald
- Website: School website

Hammond Central High School is a public secondary school located in the Northwestern Indiana city of Hammond. Part of the School City of Hammond district.

== History ==
Hammond High School was established in 1884. The building that would be the final Hammond High campus opened in 1915 as the Hammond Industrial High School.

The school caught fire on December 13, 1967. In the aftermath of the fire, students shared the campus of Hammond Tech, attending classes in the afternoon while Hammond Tech students went to class in the morning. Reconstruction after the fire was not completed until 1973.

Hammond High School graduated its final class at the old building in the spring of 2021 before a reconstruction project. The school was renamed as Hammond Central High School following the closure and consolidation of the old building as well as Gavit High School and Clark High School.

== Academic performance ==
The early 2000s saw Hammond High School placed on probationary accreditation status from the Indiana Department of Education. The school consistently underperformed on the ISTEP exams beginning in 2000–01. The pass rates for Hammond students on the 2008–09 exams was 32.8%; the statewide average was 73.7%. In 2008, the Graduation rate was 57.3%.

== Extracurricular activities ==
- Academic Super Bowl Team
- Bible Club
- Chess Club
- Debate Team
- Environmental Club
- Mock Trial
- Gamers club
- Drama Club
- Key Club
- National Honor Society
- Natural Helpers
- Science Olympiad
- Spanish Club
- Student Government

== Athletics ==
Fall sports

- Football
- Volleyball
- Boys' Soccer
- Girls' Soccer
- Cross Country

Winter sports

- Boys' Basketball
- Girls' Basketball
- Swimming
- Wrestling

Spring sports

- Baseball
- Golf
- Softball
- Girls' Tennis
- Track

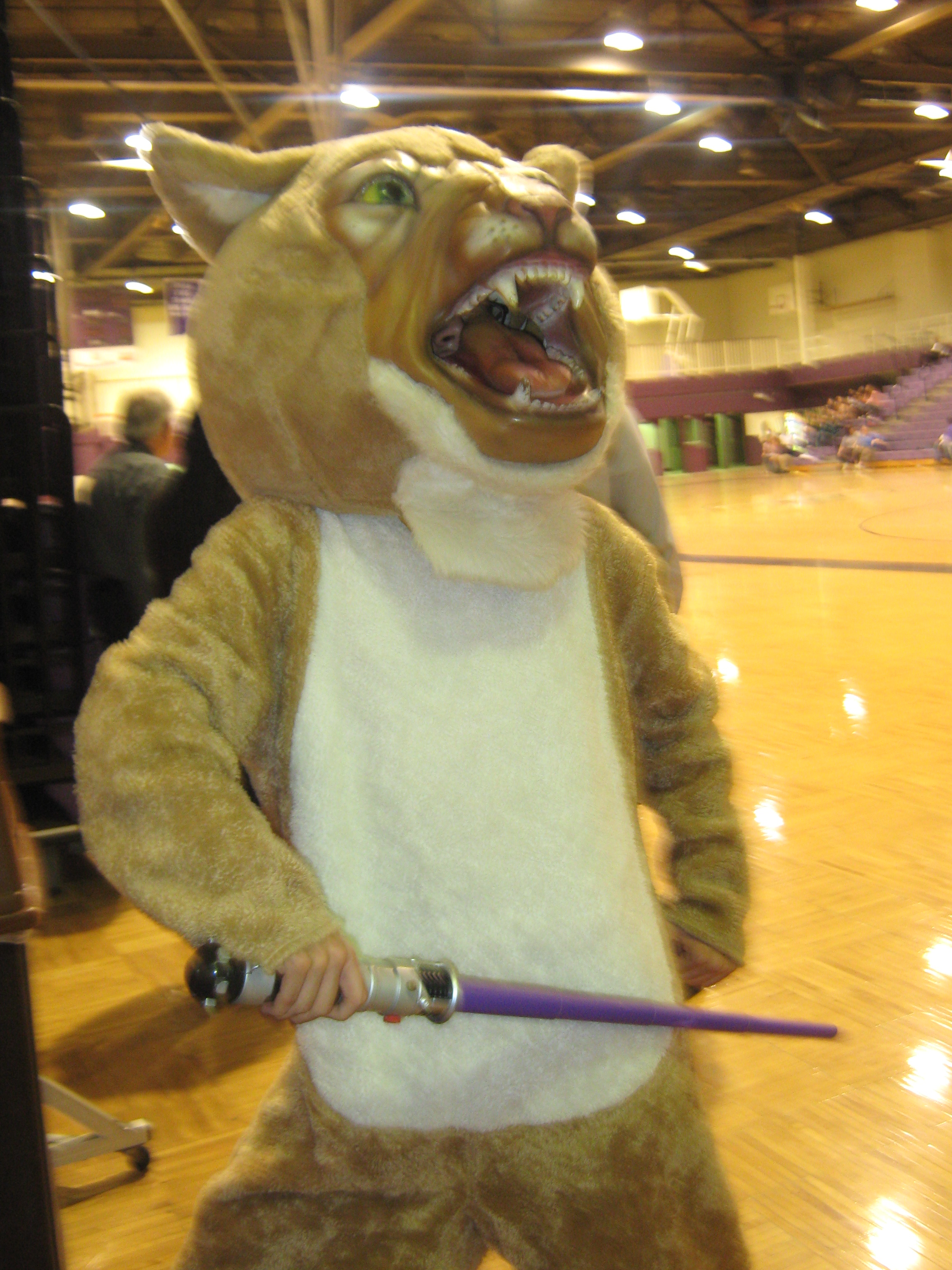
Willy the Wildcat

=== State championships ===
The Hammond Wildcats won the following IHSAA championships during their century-plus of competition:

- 1905 Boys Track & Field
- 1906 Boys Track & Field
- 1935 Wrestling
- 1936 Wrestling
- 1936 Boys Swimming & Diving
- 1937 Wrestling
- 1938 Boys Track & Field
- 1939 Boys Track & Field
- 1940 Boys Swimming & Diving
- 1941 Boys Swimming & Diving
- 1942 Boys Swimming & Diving
- 1943 Boys Swimming & Diving
- 1951 Boys Swimming & Diving
- 1952 Boys Swimming & Diving
- 1954 Boys Swimming & Diving
- 1962 Wrestling
- 1962 Football
- 1963 Wrestling

== Notable alumni ==
- Bob Anderson – former MLB player for the Detroit Tigers and Chicago Cubs
- Don Brumm – former defensive lineman for the Purdue Boilermakers football team. Former NFL player for the St. Louis Cardinals and Philadelphia Eagles
- Rudy Chapa – Decorated at the high school and collegiate level for track and field. Member of the Board of Trustees of the University of Oregon until 2017
- Jack Chevigny - Notre Dame football player, University of Texas head football coach, United States Marine killed at Iwo Jima in WWII.
- Irv Cross – former NFL cornerback for the Philadelphia Eagles and Los Angeles Rams. Former host of The NFL Today on CBS
- Dory Funk – former professional wrestler
- Bob Haak - former NFL guard and tackle for the Brooklyn Dodgers
- Bob Livingstone – former All-America Football Conference halfback for the Chicago Rockets and Buffalo Bills. Former NFL halfback for the Baltimore Colts and the Chicago Cardinals
- Jean Shepherd – Writer and narrator of A Christmas Story
- Chips Sobek – former NBA player for the Sheboygan Red Skins
- Frank Radovich - former professional basketball player for the St. Louis Hawks and Philadelphia Warriors, member of the Indiana High School Basketball Hall of Fame

== See also ==
- List of high schools in Indiana
