= Great Lakes Athletic Conference =

The Great Lakes Athletic Conference is a four-member IHSAA-sanctioned conference located entirely within Lake County. The conference is among the youngest in the state, created in 2007 following the disbandment of the Lake Athletic Conference and after failing to find acceptance in another conference for each of the four schools. The GLAC's "sister" conferences also created from the Lake Athletic Conference are the Greater South Shore Athletic Conference and the Northwest Crossroads Conference. At the start of the 2021–2022 school year, the conference lost two members as Hammond Clark and Hammond Gavit were closed due to the consolidation of Hammond Schools.

== Membership ==
School	Town	Team name	Colors	Enrollment 24–25	IHSAA Class	IHSAA Class Football	Year joined	Previous conference
East Chicago Central	East Chicago, Indiana	Cardinals		1009	3A	4A	2016	Independents (ILSC 1987)
Gary West Side	Gary, Indiana	Cougars		995	3A	4A	2018	Independents (NWC 2014)
Hammond Central	Hammond, Indiana	Wildcats		1923	4A	5A	2007	Lake
Hammond Morton	Hammond, Indiana	Governors		1534	4A	5A	2007	Lake

== State champions ==
=== Hammond High School Wildcats (17) ===
- 1905 Boys Track & Field
- 1906 Boys Track & Field
- 1935 Wrestling
- 1936 Wrestling
- 1936 Boys Swimming & Diving
- 1937 Wrestling
- 1938 Boys Track & Field
- 1939 Boys Track & Field
- 1940 Boys Swimming & Diving
- 1941 Boys Swimming & Diving
- 1942 Boys Swimming & Diving
- 1943 Boys Swimming & Diving
- 1951 Boys Swimming & Diving
- 1952 Boys Swimming & Diving
- 1954 Boys Swimming & Diving
- 1962 Wrestling
- 1963 Wrestling

=== Hammond Clark Pioneers (1) ===
- 1938 Wrestling

=== Hammond Morton Governors (1) ===
- 1965 Football

== Resources ==
- IHSAA Conferences
- IHSAA Directory
- Northern Indiana Football History
- IHSAA State Champions
- IHSAA Classification
- IHSAA Football Classification
