= Jon'Vea Johnson =

American football player (born 1995)

Profile
- Position: Wide receiver

Personal information
- Born: December 23, 1995 (age 30); Gary, Indiana, U.S.
- Listed height: 6 ft 0 in (1.83 m)
- Listed weight: 192 lb (87 kg)

Career information
- High school: West Side (IN)
- College: Toledo
- NFL draft: 2019: undrafted

Career history
- Dallas Cowboys (2019–2021)*; Jacksonville Jaguars (2021)*; Chicago Bears (2021)*; Montreal Alouettes (2022)*; Memphis Showboats (2023)*; Hamilton Tiger-Cats (2023)*; Ottawa Redblacks (2023)*
- * Offseason or practice squad member only

Awards and highlights
- Second-team All-MAC (2016); Third-team All-MAC (2018)
- Stats at Pro Football Reference

Jon'Vea J'Qyay Johnson (born December 23, 1995) is an American professional football wide receiver. He played college football at the University of Toledo. Johnson has been a member of the Dallas Cowboys, Jacksonville Jaguars, Chicago Bears, Montreal Alouettes, Memphis Showboats, Hamilton Tiger-Cats, and Ottawa Redblacks.

== Early life ==
Johnson attended West Side Leadership Academy, and was coached by his father, Jason Johnson, in football. As a junior, he registered 47 receptions for 1,054 yards and 9 touchdowns, receiving All-area honors.

As a senior, he posted 73 receptions for 1,428 yards and 23 touchdowns, receiving All-state honors and was named one of the top 22 players in the state by Indiana Preps.

He also practiced basketball and was a two-time All-state sprinter, finishing third in the 100 metres at the 2013 state finals.

== College career ==
Johnson accepted a football scholarship from the University of Toledo. As a redshirt freshman, he appeared in 12 games (one start), making 10 receptions for 142 yards and one receiving touchdown.

As a sophomore, he started 11 out of 13 games opposite of future NFL wide receiver Cody Thompson. He recorded 40 receptions for 773 yards (third on the team), a 19.3-yard average and 10 receiving touchdowns (tied for fifth in school history). He had 9 receptions, 182 yards (seventh in school history) and 3 receiving touchdowns (tied for third in school history) against Brigham Young University.

As a junior, he started all 14 games opposite of future NFL player Diontae Johnson. He collected 42 receptions for 689 yards (second on the team), a 16.4-yard average and 5 receiving touchdowns. He had 5 receptions for 102 yards and 2 touchdowns against the University of Akron in the MAC Championship Game.

As a senior, he was a backup behind first-team All-conference wide receivers Johnson and Thompson. He appeared in all 12 games (2 starts), registering 32 receptions for 660 yards (second on the team), a 20.6-yard average and 9 receiving touchdowns. He had 6 receptions for 112 yards and 2 touchdowns against Fresno State University.

He finished his college career with 53 games (second in school history), 125 receptions, 2,265 yards (eighth in school history), a 18.1-yard average and 25 receiving touchdowns (tied for second in school history).

== Professional career ==
=== Dallas Cowboys ===
Johnson was signed by the Dallas Cowboys as an undrafted free agent after the 2019 NFL draft on April 30. He was one of the team's early standouts during organized team activities, but struggled during preseason games. He was placed on the injured reserve list with a shoulder injury on August 30.

Johnson was placed on the reserve/COVID-19 list by the Cowboys on July 26, 2020. He was activated on August 9, 2020. He was waived on September 5, 2020, and signed to the practice squad the next day. He signed a reserve/future contract with the Cowboys on January 4, 2021. He was waived by the Cowboys on March 19, 2021.

=== Jacksonville Jaguars ===
On March 20, 2021, Johnson was claimed off waivers by the Jacksonville Jaguars. He was waived on June 19.

=== Chicago Bears ===
Johnson was signed by the Chicago Bears on July 27, 2021. He was waived on August 31, 2021, and re-signed to the practice squad the next day. He was released on November 4.

=== Montreal Alouettes ===
On August 8, 2022, Johnson was signed by the Montreal Alouettes of the Canadian Football League. He spent the entire 2022 season on the practice roster and was released upon the completion of the Alouettes' season on November 14, 2022.

=== Memphis Showboats ===
On February 14, 2023, Johnson signed with the Memphis Showboats of the United States Football League (USFL). He was released on April 10.

=== Hamilton Tiger-Cats ===
On May 5, 2023, Johnson signed with the Hamilton Tiger-Cats of the Canadian Football League (CFL). On June 2, 2023, Johnson was released by the Tiger-Cats. He was signed to the practice squad a couple of weeks later on June 14, 2023. He was released on June 20, 2023.

=== Ottawa Redblacks ===
Johnson was signed to the practice roster of the Ottawa Redblacks on September 25, 2023. He was released from the practice roster on October 29 and signed to a futures contract on October 31, 2023. He was released on June 1, 2024.

== Personal life ==
His father Jason Johnson played in the NFL as a wide receiver for the Denver Broncos, Pittsburgh Steelers and New Orleans Saints.
