= James Hamblin (journalist) =

American journalist and physician

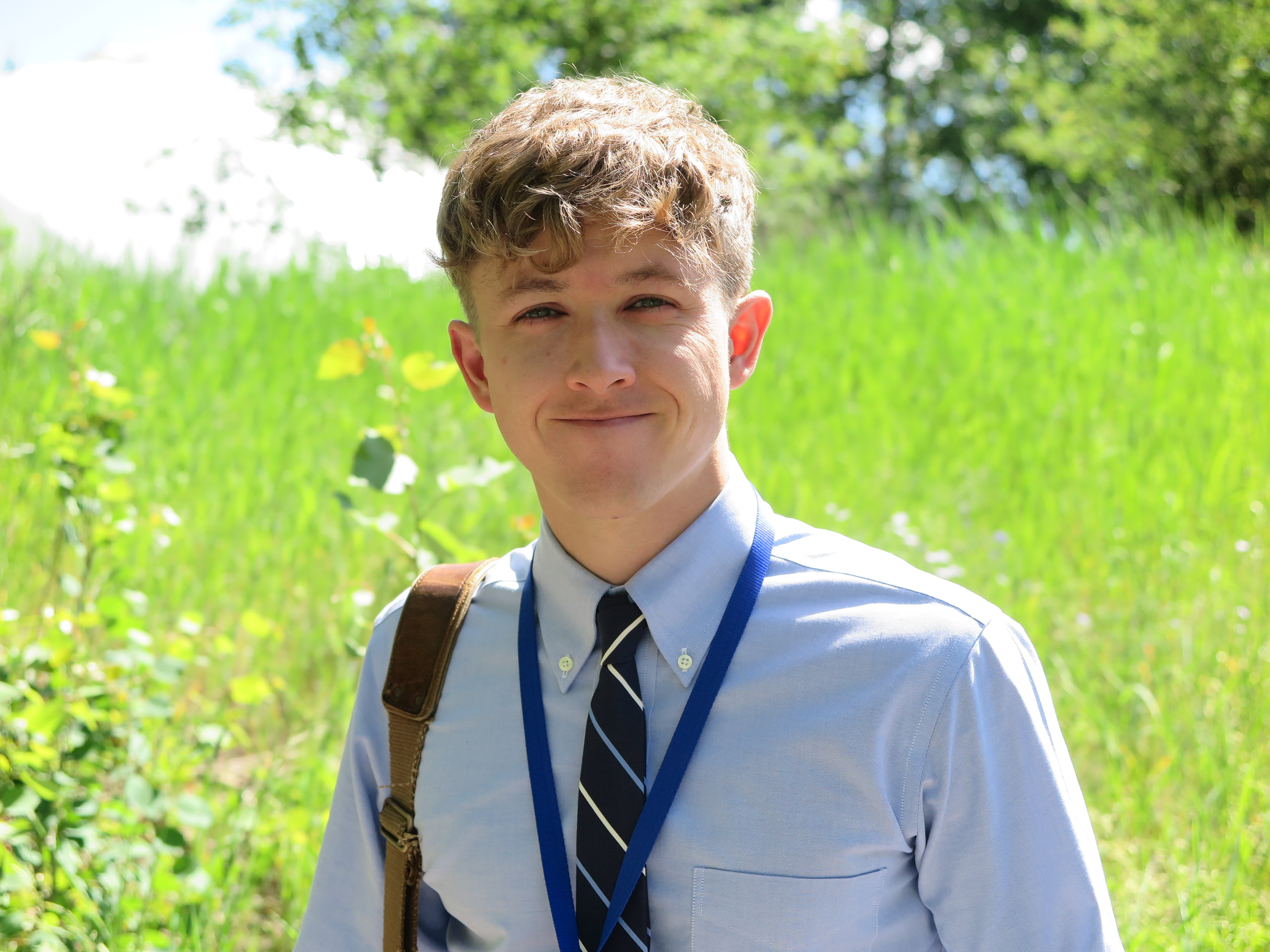
- Born: James Richard Hamblin
- Education: Wake Forest University (BS); Indiana University, Indianapolis (MD); Yale University (MPH)
- Occupations: Writer, editor, physician
- Known for: Preventive medicine Bioethics
- Style: Literary nonfiction

James Richard Hamblin is an American physician specializing in public health and preventive medicine. He is a former staff writer at The Atlantic, an author, and a lecturer in public health policy at Yale University.

== Early life and education ==
Hamblin grew up in Munster, Indiana, and graduated from Munster High School. He received his undergraduate degree from Wake Forest University where he was a member of the Lilting Banshees comedy troupe. Hamblin later graduated from the School of Medicine at Indiana University, then did his internship in internal medicine at Mount Auburn Hospital. He began a residency as a radiologist at the Medical Center at the University of California, Los Angeles. During his residency, Hamblin trained in improv at the Upright Citizens Brigade Theatre in Los Angeles. He says he was regularly mistaken for a student due to looking younger than his age, and has often been compared to the sitcom teenage genius Doogie Howser. He later completed a residency in general preventive medicine at Griffin Hospital which is affiliated with Yale University.

== Career ==
In 2012, he chose to pursue a career in media and joined The Atlantic and became the editor for its health channel, which had been launched in 2011. In 2013, he created an online comedy video show about health and lifestyle topics on The Atlantic website called If Our Bodies Could Talk, for which he was a finalist for a Webby award for Best Web Personality/Host and was last produced in 2017. He has been named among the 140 people to follow on Twitter by Time, and BuzzFeed has called him "the most delightful MD ever" in response to his work with that show. He also authored If Our Bodies Could Talk, a nonfiction book about human health published by Doubleday. His second book, Clean, was published by Riverhead. The New York Times Book Review named it an editor's choice and Vanity Fair named among the best books of 2020.

Hamblin was a staff writer for The Atlantic magazine, where he was also a senior editor for five years. He has appeared on The Late Show with Stephen Colbert. He has given talks at Harvard Medical School, the Wharton School of Business, South by Southwest, and TEDMED. In 2016, he served as moderator at the launch of the White House Precision Medicine Initiative where he interviewed President Barack Obama. Hamblin is a past Yale University Poynter Fellow in journalism. He is board certified in Public Health and General Preventive Medicine.

== Personal life ==
In 2019, Hamblin married Sarah Freeman Yager, a managing editor of The Atlantic. They reside in Brooklyn, New York.

== Books ==
- If Our Bodies Could Talk. Doubleday. 2017. ISBN 978-0385540971.
- Clean. Riverhead. 2020. ISBN 978-0525538318.
