= Carson Cunningham =

American basketball coach and author (born 1977)

Current position
- Title: Associate head coach
- Team: Air Force
- Conference: Mountain West Conference

Biographical details
- Born: June 7, 1977 (age 49); Ogden Dunes, Indiana, U.S.

Playing career
- 1996–1997: Oregon State
- 1998–2001: Purdue
- 2001–2002: Gary Steelheads
- 2002–2003: Rockford Lightning
- 2002–2003: Kalev/Cramo
- 2004–2005: Rockford Lightning

Coaching career (HC unless noted)
- 2007–2013: Andrean HS
- 2013–2018: Carroll (MT)
- 2018–2023: Incarnate Word
- 2023–2024: Army (assistant)
- 2024–2026: Missouri State (assistant)
- 2026–present: Air Force (AHC)

Head coaching record
- Overall: 149–155 (.490) {college}
- Tournaments: 5–3 (NAIA)

Accomplishments and honors

Championships
- Frontier Conference (2016–17, 2017–18); Frontier Conference Tourney (2016–17, 2017–18)

Carson Cunningham (born June 7, 1977) is an American basketball coach and author who is currently the associate head coach for the Air Force Falcons of the Mountain West Conference. He is the former head coach of the Incarnate Word Cardinals men's basketball team.

== Playing career ==
Cunningham was a standout basketball player at Andrean High School in Merrillville, Indiana, where he was a four-year letterwinner and a three-time first team all-area selection, as well as first team all-state selection and USA Today honorable mention All-American as a senior.

Playing his freshman season of college basketball at Oregon State, Cunningham averaged 14.9 points per game, earning a place on the 1997 Pacific 10 All-Freshman team. Cunningham would transfer back to the state of Indiana, enrolling at Purdue to play under Gene Keady and was part of the Boilermakers 1999 Sweet 16 and 2000 Elite Eight squads.

Upon graduation, Cunningham played in the Continental Basketball Association for the Gary Steelheads and Rockford Lightning from 2001 to 2005, while also playing abroad in Australia and Estonia. While in Estonia, he led his club (Kalev/Cramo in scoring (21.5 ppg) and assists (4.8 apg).

== Coaching career ==
Cunningham got his start in coaching at the high school ranks, taking the helm of his alma mater, Andrean High School for five seasons, where he compiled an 81–39 record, winning four sectional championships before accepting the head coaching position at NAIA institution Carroll College in Montana.

At Carroll, Cunningham inherited a Fighting Saints team that had won just two games, and in five seasons amassed a 107–52 record, including three-straight 20-win seasons, and two Frontier Conference men's basketball regular season and tournament titles, along with three trips to NAIA Men's Basketball Championships, and two quarterfinal appearances.

Cunningham was named head coach at NCAA Division I institution Incarnate Word on March 22, 2018. Following five straight losing seasons as head coach, Incarnate Word fired Cunningham in 2023.

After his dismissal from Incarnate Word, Cunningham became an assistant coach for the Army Black Knights basketball team.

On May 1, 2024, Cunningham was named an assistant coach for the Missouri State Bears basketball team.

In April 2026, Cunningham became the associate head coach for Joe Crispin's inaugural coaching staff at Air Force.

== Published works ==
Cunningham is the author of five books, which range from fiction to non-fiction on topics such as Olympic basketball, his experiences in the CBA, athletes who died in combat, the Chicago Cubs, and modern reimagining of Huckleberry Finn.

== Head coaching record ==
=== NAIA ===
Record table
Season	Team	Overall	Conference	Standing	Postseason
Carroll Fighting Saints (Frontier Conference) (2013–2018)
2013–14	Carroll	9–19	4–12	N/A	
2014–15	Carroll	18–11	7–7	4th	
2015–16	Carroll	23–10	12–5	2nd	NAIA Division I Elite Eight
2016–17	Carroll	29–6	15–3	1st	NAIA Division I Elite Eight
2017–18	Carroll	28–6	13–5	1st	NAIA Division I Second Round
Carroll College:		107–52 (.673)	51–32 (.614)		
Total:		107–52 (.673)			
National champion Postseason invitational champion Conference regular season champion Conference regular season and conference tournament champion Division regular season champion Division regular season and conference tournament champion Conference tournament champion

=== NCAA Div I ===
Record table
Season	Team	Overall	Conference	Standing	Postseason
Incarnate Word Cardinals (Southland Conference) (2018–present)
2018–19	Incarnate Word	6–25	1–17	13th	
2019–20	Incarnate Word	9–22	6–14	10th	
2020–21	Incarnate Word	8–14	5–9	8th	
2021–22	Incarnate Word	7–25	3–11	8th	
2022–23	Incarnate Word	12–19	6–12	T–8th	
Incarnate Word:		42–105 (.286)	21–63 (.250)		
Total:		42–105 (.286)			
National champion Postseason invitational champion Conference regular season champion Conference regular season and conference tournament champion Division regular season champion Division regular season and conference tournament champion Conference tournament champion
