= The Lilting Banshees =

Comedy troupe at Wake Forest University

The Lilting Banshees are a sketch comedy troupe at Wake Forest University in North Carolina. They are notable for launching the entertainment careers of several alumni and for being a popular campus attraction.

== History ==
The sketch comedy troupe was founded in 1998 by Ben Tomlin '94, Matt Jones '96, and several other theatre students. The founders based their name on a CD of Irish harp music that Tomlin found in the theatre department sound booth. In 2019, they celebrated their 25th reunion. Over 40 alumni attended the reunion show. They performed classic sketches and unveiled a new fund in memory of alumnus James Buscher ‘98, who died in a car accident in 2010.

== Style and content ==
Members plan each show three months in advance. They meet regularly to pitch ideas for sketches, and after there are a sufficient number of them, they host a “War Room” session where they choose the sketches; according to tradition, each decision must be unanimous. Previous topics have included the excessively long lines at Chick-Fil-A and how cavemen first discovered cow's milk. Some performances feature sexually suggestive content.

== Alumni ==
The Banshees have helped to launch the careers of several notable alumni in entertainment-related fields.

- Dr. James Hamblin is the author of If Our Bodies Could Talk and a staff writer for The Atlantic. He has served as a moderator for the Precision Medicine Initiative and interviewed President Barack Obama.
- Sarah Schneider wrote and acted for CollegeHumor prior to becoming a writer for Saturday Night Live. After leaving SNL in 2017, she partnered with head writer Chris Kelly to create The Other Two, which premiered on Comedy Central in 2019.
- Emma Hunsinger is a cartoonist with work appearing in a variety of publications. She currently holds the record for the longest comic to appear in The New Yorker after releasing a ten-page feature.
- Shane Harris is an American journalist and author. He graduated in 1998. Harris was remembered for his portrayal and roasting of Chaplain Ed Christman's "What's in a Name?" freshman orientation speech.
