= Central High School (East Chicago, Indiana) =

East Chicago Central High School

Location
- 1100 West Columbus Drive; East Chicago, Lake County, Indiana 46312; United States; 41°38′23″N 87°29′6″W

Information
- Type: Public High School
- Established: 1986
- School district: School City of East Chicago
- Educational authority: Indiana State Board of Education
- Superintendent: Dr. Stephan Bournes / Assistant Superintendent Dr. Leslie Yanders
- Principal: Abrian Brown
- Asst. Principal: David Tokarz
- Teaching staff: 74.67 (FTE)
- Grades: 9th Grade–12th Grade
- Enrollment: 1,021 (2023-2024)
- Student to teacher ratio: 13.67
- Colors: Cardinal red Navy blue
- Slogan: "Home of the Cardinals"
- Athletics conference: Great Lakes
- Team name: Cardinals
- Rival: Gary West Side High School
- Website: central.scec.k12.in.us

East Chicago Central High School (or commonly known as Central or EC Central), is a public high school in the industrial city of East Chicago, Indiana, in the eastern portion of the Chicago metropolitan area.

All of East Chicago is in the School City of East Chicago district, and this is the sole comprehensive high school of that school district.

== History ==
The school district built East Chicago Central High School in 1986 to replace two aging high schools: East Chicago Washington and East Chicago Roosevelt High Schools. Central's first semester began in the fall of 1986.

== Academics ==
East Chicago Central High School is ranked 293rd out of the 397 high schools of Indiana and 12,248th in National Rankings. Central had an average composite ACT score of 22 and has a 69% graduation rate. (State graduation rate average is 86%.) Central students' proficiency in math is 12% (lower than the Indiana state average of 54%). Students' proficiency in reading/language arts is 33% (lower than the Indiana state average of 62%). Central High School placed in the bottom 50% of all schools in Indiana for overall test scores. (Math proficiency is bottom 50%, and reading proficiency is bottom 50%.)

== Athletics ==
The athletic director is Grayling Gordon.

The Cardinals compete in the Great Lakes Conference (GLC) as well as in the state championship series sponsored by the Indiana High School Athletic Association (IHSAA) which governs athletic activities in Indiana. School colors are Cardinal red and Navy blue.

The school sponsors interscholastic teams for boys and girls respectively in basketball, co-ed flag football, co-ed track, cross country, soccer, swimming & diving, and tennis. Girls also compete in volleyball, and boys also compete in baseball, football, golf, and wrestling.

East Chicago Central athletic teams placed in the top four of their respective class in their respective sports in IHSAA sponsored state championship series:

- Basketball (Boys): State Champions (1960, 1971, 2007) Semi-State Champions (1947, 1960, 1962, 1966, 1971, 1976, 1977, 1985) Regional Champions: (1925, 1927, 1928, 1929, 1930, 1931, 1936, 1940, 1941, 1942, 1944, 1953, 1963, 1967, 1978, 1979, 1983, 2025) Sectional Champions: (1987, 1989, 1991, 1992, 1993, 1994, 1995, 2001, 2003, 2004, 2006, 2007, 2008, 2016, 2017, 2024, 2025)
- Basketball (Girls): State Champions (1977, 1979)
- Football: Conference Champion (2016) State Champions (1945, 1946, 1949, 1955, 1957) Regional Champion: (2013 Class 4A Regional)
- Wrestling: State Champions (1934)

*Titles won by East Chicago Washington High School and East Chicago Roosevelt High School are claimed by Central as a result of merging in 1986 to become East Chicago Central High School.

=== John A. Baratto Athletic Center ===
The John A. Baratto Athletic Center is the third-largest high school basketball gym by seating capacity in the United States with 8,054 seats, behind Lloyd E. Scott Gymnasium at Seymour High School (capacity: 8,228) and New Castle Fieldhouse at New Castle High School (capacity: 8,424), both of which are also in Indiana.

The gym was dedicated in 1988 and is named in honor of legendary EC Washington basketball coach John Baratto, who went 484–170, secured 15 sectional titles, 8 regional titles, 4 semi-state crowns, and the 1960 IHSAA basketball title. Baratto was inducted into the Indiana Basketball Hall of Fame in 1972.

== Demographics ==
The racial makeup of students attending Central is 51% Hispanic, 47% African-American, 2% White, and 1% Two or More Races. The gender makeup is 48% female and 52% male.

== Notable alumni ==
- Jermaine Couisnard - professional basketball player
- Ángel García - professional basketball player
- Damien Jefferson - professional basketball player
- Monica Maxwell - former WNBA player, former assistant coach at Pike High School
- E'Twaun Moore - former NBA Player
- Kawann Short - NFL player, formerly played for Carolina Panthers
- Miguel Torres - former MMA fighter

== See also ==
- List of high schools in Indiana
- Largest high school gyms in the United States
