= Andrean High School =

Private coeducational school in Merrillville, Indiana, United States

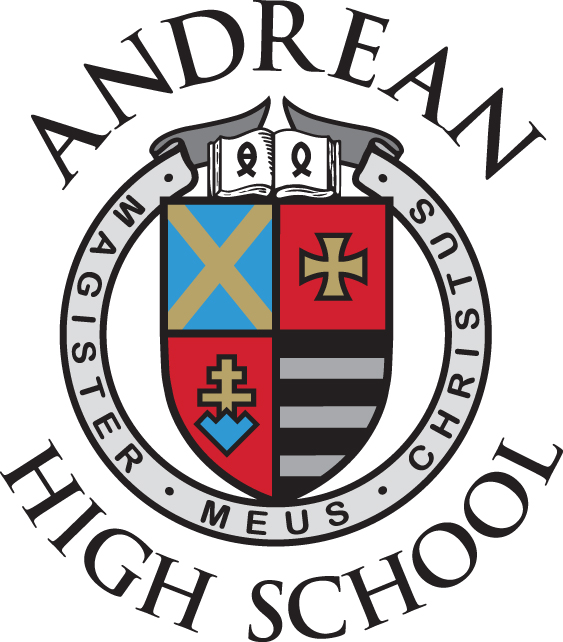

Location
- 5959 Broadway; Merrillville, Indiana 46410; United States; 41°30′38″N 87°20′0″W

Information
- Type: Private, Coeducational
- Motto: Magister Meus Christus (Christ is My Teacher)
- Religious affiliation: Roman Catholic
- Established: 1959
- Authority: Diocese of Gary
- Principal: Jaycob Knazur
- Teaching staff: 41.6 (FTE)
- Grades: 9–12
- Enrollment: 408 (2023–2024)
- Student to teacher ratio: 18.1
- Campus size: 47 acres (19 ha)
- Colors: Red and Old Gold
- Athletics conference: Northwest Crossroads Conference
- Nickname: The Fighting 59ers
- Rival: Gary West Side High School; Merrillville High School; Crown Point High School; 21st Century Charter School of Gary; Bishop Noll Institute
- Newspaper: The Acropolis
- Yearbook: The Decussata
- Tuition: $8,800
- Website: www.andreanhs.org

Andrean High School is a Catholic co-educational, college preparatory secondary school in Merrillville, Indiana. It is located in the Diocese of Gary.

== History ==
Andrean High School first opened its doors to 337 students on September 14, 1959, and is named for St. Andrew, the patron saint of the first bishop of the diocese of the Diocese of Gary, Andrew Grutka. Bishop Leo Aloysius Pursley from the Diocese of Fort Wayne and Grutka from the newly formed Diocese of Gary were instrumental in its creation.

At the time of its opening, the school was centrally located Catholic high school between Bishop Noll Institute in Hammond, Indiana, and Marquette Catholic High School in Michigan City. Through most of its history, Andrean has been staffed in part by members of the Basilian Fathers and the Sisters of Saints Cyril and Methodius. The school colors are red and gold in honor of the martyrdom and subsequent glory of St. Andrew. The school motto is "Magister Meus Christus," or "Christ is My Teacher."

== Demographics ==
The racial breakdown of the 442 students enrolled for the 2024 - 2025 school year was:

- Asian – 5.7%
- Black – 30.9%
- Hispanic – 11.8%
- White – 41.2%
- Multiracial – 10.4%

== Athletics ==
The school's teams are the Fighting '59ers. This name comes from the address of the school, 5959 Broadway, and the year of its founding- 1959. Andrean competes in the Northwest Crossroads Conference. The following IHSAA sanctioned sports are offered:

- Baseball (boys)
  - State champions – 2005, 2009, 2010, 2014, 2015, 2018, 2019 2022, 2025
- Basketball (girls & boys)
  - State champions (boys) – 2019
- Cross country (girls & boys)
- Football (boys)
  - State champions – 2004, 2005, 2006, 2007, 2008, 2009, 2010, 2011, 2012 2013, 2014, 2015, 2016, 2017, 2018, 2019, 2020, 2021, 2022, 2023, 2024, 2025, 2026
- Golf (girls & boys)
- Soccer (girls & boys)
  - State champions (girls) – 2016
- Softball (girls)
  - State champions – 1998, 2007, 2012
- Tennis (girls & boys)
- Track (girls & boys)
- Volleyball (girls)
  - State champions – 2017, 2021
- Wrestling (boys)

== Notable alumni ==
- Drayk Bowen - college football linebacker for the Notre Dame Fighting Irish
- Dawn LoVerde Brancheau – professional animal trainer
- Mike Brosseau – Major League Baseball player
- Carson Cunningham – former Incarnate Word Cardinals Head Coach
- Dan Dakich - basketball sportscaster and former men's college basketball Head Coach
- Chase Dawson - baseball player
- Eugene German (born 1997) - basketball player in the Israeli Basketball Premier League
- Luke Harangody – professional basketball player
- Sean Manaea – Major League Baseball player
- Len Matela - former professional basketball player
- Rebecca Quick - co-host of CNBC's Squawk Box
- Pete Visclosky – former member of the U.S. House of Representatives from Indiana's 1st congressional district (northwest Indiana)

== See also ==
- List of high schools in Indiana
