= Bob Livingstone =

American football player (1922–2013)

No. 82, 70, 80, 86
- Positions: Halfback, defensive back

Personal information
- Born: May 11, 1922; Hammond, Indiana, U.S.
- Died: August 1, 2013 (aged 91); Munster, Indiana, U.S.
- Listed height: 6 ft 0 in (1.83 m)
- Listed weight: 173 lb (78 kg)

Career information
- High school: Hammond
- College: Notre Dame (1941–1942, 1946–1947)
- NFL draft: 1945: 22nd round, 225; Redrafted 1951, 29th round, 343rd overall after termination of Colts franchise.th overall pick

Career history
- Chicago Rockets/Hornets (1948–1949); Buffalo Bills (1949); Baltimore Colts (1950)

Awards and highlights
- 2× National champion (1946, 1947)

Career NFL/AAFC statistics
- Rushing yards: 171
- Rushing average: 3
- Receptions: 18
- Receiving yards: 320
- Total touchdowns: 3
- Stats at Pro Football Reference

Robert Edward Livingstone (May 11, 1922 – August 1, 2013) was an American football halfback who played two seasons in the All-America Football Conference (AAFC) with the Chicago Rockets/Hornets and Buffalo Bills. He was drafted by the Chicago Bears of the National Football League (NFL) in the 22nd round of the 1945 NFL draft. He played college football at the University of Notre Dame and attended Hammond High School in Hammond, Indiana.

== Early life ==
Livingstone earned varsity letters in football, basketball and baseball at Hammond High School in 1939 and 1940. He earned All-State honors as a halfback in 1940. He graduated in 1941.

== College career ==
Livingstone first played for the Notre Dame Fighting Irish from 1941 to 1942, lettering in 1942. He served in the United States Army during World War II from 1943 to 1945 and survived hand-to-hand combat with Japanese soldiers. He returned to Notre Dame in 1946 and lettered for the team from 1946 to 1947. Livingstone set a school record for longest run when he scored a 92-yard rushing touchdown in 1947 against the USC Trojans. He played in the Chicago College All-Star Game in 1948. He graduated from Notre Dame in 1948.

== Professional career ==
Livingstone was selected in the 22nd round by the Chicago Bears of the NFL with the 225th overall pick in the 1945 NFL draft. He was selected by the Chicago Rockets of the AAFC in the fourteenth round with the 108th overall pick in the 1947 AAFC Draft. He played in nineteen games, starting five, for the Chicago Rockets/Hornets from 1948 to 1949. Livingstone played in five games for the AAFC's Buffalo Bills during the 1949 season. He played in eleven games for the NFL's Baltimore Colts in 1950. The Colts folded after the 1950 season and the team's players were eligible for the 1951 NFL draft. He was selected by the Chicago Cardinals in the 29th round with the 343rd overall pick in the 1951 NFL Draft.

== Personal life ==
Livingstone was inducted into the Hammond Sports Hall of Fame in 1987 and the Indiana Football Hall of Fame in 2009.
