= Union Township School Corporation =

School district in Indiana

Coordinates: 41°28′44.1″N 87°10′48.1″W

The Union Township School Corporation is the school system that serves Union Township, Porter County, Indiana, USA. Union Township is predominantly a rural area.

== Schools ==
- Wheeler High School, 587 W 300 N
- Union Township Middle School, 599 W 300 N
- Union Center Elementary School, 272 N 600 W
- John Simatovich Elementary School, 424 W 500 N
