= Wheeler High School (Indiana) =

Location
- 587 West 300 North; Valparaiso, Indiana 46385; United States; 41°28′45″N 87°10′46″W

Information
- Type: Public
- School district: Union Township School Corporation
- Principal: Ryan Kruszka
- Faculty: 36.50 (FTE)
- Enrollment: 417 (2023-24)
- Student to teacher ratio: 11.42
- Color
- Athletics conference: Greater South Shore
- Team name: Bearcats
- Website: wheeler.union.k12.in.us

Wheeler High School is a public high school located in Union Township, west of Valparaiso, Indiana, United States. The school is attached to Union Township Middle School and was previously located in Wheeler, Indiana. It is a part of the Union Township School Corporation.

== Academics ==
=== Vocational education ===
Wheeler High School features a Law Enforcement Career Academy. This program is available to all juniors and seniors and is intended for students wishing to pursue careers in Police, Courts, or Corrections. Students at all area schools are allowed to enroll. The students can also receive three college credits from Vincennes University.

Junior and senior students may also take vocational classes at other area schools via the Porter County Vocational Education program.

=== Fine arts ===
Wheeler High School has a choir, band (marching band, pep and colorguard) art department, and drama department.

== Athletics ==
Wheeler High School offers multiple athletic teams during the academic year and includes an indoor swimming pool, a fieldhouse, and a standard gym on campus. Athletic teams are known as the Bearcats and the school has won state championships in boys basketball (2010) and softball (2010).

=== Boys sports ===
- Baseball
- Basketball
- Bowling
- Cross Country
- Football
- Golf
- Soccer
- Swimming and Diving
- Tennis
- Track and Field
- Wrestling

=== Girls sports ===
- Basketball
- Bowling
- Cheerleading
- Cross Country
- Soccer
- Softball
- Tennis
- Track and Field
- Volleyball
- Swimming
- Wrestling

== Demographics ==
In the 2009–2010 school year, Wheeler High was 49.4% female and 50.6% male. The racial breakdown was:

- White 89.9%
- Black 1.7%
- Hispanic 2.9%
- Asian 0.5%
- Native American 0.5%
- Multiracial 4.4%

== Accomplishments ==
- 2010 IHSAA Boys Basketball Class 2A Champions
- 2010 IHSAA Girls Softball Class 2A Champions

== See also ==
- List of high schools in Indiana
