= School Town of Munster =

School district in Indiana

Coordinates: 41°33′30.4″N 87°30′05.7″W

Address
- 8616 Columbia Ave Munster, Indiana Lake County 46321; United States

District information
- Type: Public
- Grades: Pre-K–12
- Superintendent: Bret Heller
- Accreditation: NCA
- Schools: 5
- NCES District ID: 1807350

Students and staff
- Students: 4,101 (2024–250
- Teachers: 248.00 (on an FTE basis)
- Student–teacher ratio: 16.54
- District mascot: Mustang
- Colors: Red and white

Other information
- Website: www.munster.us

The School Town of Munster is the school district that serves the town of Munster, Indiana. All of Munster is in this district.

There are three elementary schools, a middle school, and a high school. There is also an early childhood educational center. Munster High School, the district's only high school, is one of seven Indiana schools included in the Newsweek's 2006 Top Schools list at number 1,134. The school also made the list in 2008 (1257) and in 2010 (1151).

The first school was built in 1852 by the North Township Trustees on the corner of Greenwood and Ridge Road. The first teacher was Chauncey Wilson, who also served as a farmer and local justice of the peace. According to documents in the Munster Historical Society, Wilson died in the Civil War and his wife, Julie Ann, completed his teaching term.

In 1870 a new one-room school was built across the road from the first school. Later this building was moved across the road to the Stallbohm Farm, where it became a tool shed. This building was demolished in 1924. Once it was determined to be obsolete in 1875, a new three room school building was built on the corner of Ridge Road and Calumet Avenue from land purchased from Jacob Munster. In 1914 the building became the Town Hall and was torn down in 1920.

A new Munster school was built in 1914 on the corner of Ridge Road and Columbia Avenue, on the present day site of the Center for the Visual and Performing Arts. Originally known as "Munster School" until 1950, it was renamed the James F. Lanier School, a wealthy Madison, Indiana banker who had twice "saved" the State of Indiana from bankruptcy during the Civil War. The original school had six classrooms and eventually expanded to thirteen.

The School Town of Munster was created in 1972, following the Indiana Legislature's passing of the 1959 School Corporation Reorganization Act, which mandated that schools numbering in enrollment under 1000 students be consolidated into larger "corporations."
