= Donald E. Gavit Jr./Sr. High School =

Public high school in Hammond, Indiana, US

Donald E. Gavit Jr./Sr. School

Location
- 1670 175th Street; Hammond, Indiana 46324; United States
- Coordinates: 41°34′36″N 87°29′14″W

Information
- Type: Public high school
- School district: School City of Hammond
- Superintendent: Scott Miller
- Principal: Michelle Ondas-Biel
- Faculty: 86.00 (FTE)
- Grades: 6-12
- Enrollment: 1,557 (2019-20)
- Student to teacher ratio: 18.10
- Color
- Athletics conference: Great Lakes
- Team name: Gladiators
- Website: Website

Donald E. Gavit Jr./Sr. School (Gavit) was a public secondary school located in Hammond, Indiana. Part of the School City of Hammond district, it graduated its final class in the spring of 2021.

== Demographics ==
The demographic breakdown of the 1,619 students enrolled for the 2017–2018 school year was:

- African American - 38.7%
- Hispanic - 38.3%
- Multiracial - 3.6%
- Caucasian - 19.1%

In addition, 78.7% of the students qualified for free or reduced lunch.

== See also ==
- List of high schools in Indiana
