= Munster High School =

Location
- 8808 Columbia Avenue; Munster, Indiana 46321; United States; 41°33′16″N 87°30′17″W

Information
- Type: Public high school
- Established: 1967
- School district: School Town of Munster
- Superintendent: Bret Heller
- NCES School ID: 180735001257
- Principal: Morgan Nolan
- Teaching staff: 88.40 (on an FTE basis)
- Grades: 9–12
- Enrollment: 1,474 (2024–25)
- Student to teacher ratio: 16.67
- Colors: Red and white
- Athletics conference: Northwest Crossroads
- Nickname: Mustangs
- Newspaper: Crier
- Yearbook: Paragon
- Website: mhs.munster.us

Munster High School (MHS) is a public high school in Munster, Indiana, United States, and is the only high school in the School Town of Munster district.

== Demographics ==
The demographic breakdown of the 1,515 students enrolled in 2019–20 was:

- Male - 50%
- Female - 50%
- Native American/Alaskan - 0%
- Asian/Pacific islanders - 6%
- Black - 8%
- Hispanic - 23%
- White - 58%
- Multiracial - 4%

15% of the students were eligible for free or reduced-price lunch.

== Athletics ==
The following sports are offered at Munster High School:

- Baseball (boys)
  - State champ 2002
- Basketball (girls & boys)
- Cross country (girls & boys)
- Football (boys)
- Golf (girls & boys)
- Soccer (girls & boys)
- Softball (girls)
- Swimming and diving (girls & boys)
  - Boys state champs 1973–1977, 1979, 1980
  - Girls state champs 1976-1978
- Tennis (girls & boys)
- Track and field (girls & boys)
- Volleyball (girls)
- Wrestling (boys)

== Notable alumni ==
- Stephan Bonnar - retired professional mixed martial artist, most notably with the UFC
- William C. Bradford - professor of political science and law; attorney general, Chiricahua Apache Nation
- Chris Chyung - former member of the Indiana House of Representatives
- James Hamblin - journalist and doctor
- Emuoboh Ken Gbagi - Nigerian businessman, politician, and community leader
- Nan Hayworth - former U.S. representative for New York's 19th congressional district
- Sue Hendrickson - paleontologist responsible for discovery of the largest specimen of a T. rex found and one of the most complete skeletons recorded
- Goran Kralj - lead singer of The Gufs
- Joe Mansueto - founder, majority owner and CEO of Morningstar, Inc.
- Ryan McMahen - former MLS player for the Kansas City Wizards, as well as various developmental league teams including the Michigan Bucks and Austin Aztex
- Hal Morris - former MLB first baseman for the Detroit Tigers, Cincinnati Reds, Kansas City Royals and New York Yankees
- Michelle Oakley - wildlife veterinarian and subject of National Geographic television show, Yukon Vet
- Mike Pellicciotti - politician and Washington state treasurer
- Todd Rokita - former secretary of state of Indiana, former member of the U.S. House of Representatives from Indiana's 4th congressional district, and Indiana attorney general
- Judy Troy - short story writer and novelist
- Jill Underly - educator and Wisconsin State superintendent of Public Instruction

== See also ==
- List of high schools in Indiana
