= Oliver P. Morton High School =

Location
- 6915 Grand Avenue; Hammond, Lake County, Indiana 46323; United States; 41°35′10″N 87°26′26″W

Information
- Type: Public high school
- Established: 1937
- School district: School City of Hammond
- Superintendent: Anthony Salinas
- Principal: Christine Wheeler
- Teaching staff: 93.41 (FTE)
- Grades: 9–12
- Enrollment: 1,534 (2023–2024)
- Student to teacher ratio: 16.42
- Color
- Athletics conference: Great Lakes
- Team name: Governors
- Website: School website

Oliver P. Morton High School is a public secondary school located in Hammond, Indiana, in the School City of Hammond district. It is named for Oliver P. Morton, the 14th Governor of Indiana.

== History ==
The school was established in 1937 at its former location on Marshall Avenue in the Hessville section of Hammond. It became a four-year school in 1954. The current facility opened in 1968.

== Notable alumni ==
- Darrel Chaney – former MLB player for the Cincinnati Reds and Atlanta Braves
- Frank J. Mrvan – politician
- Stan Perzanowski – former MLB player for the Chicago White Sox, Texas Rangers and Minnesota Twins

== See also ==
- List of high schools in Indiana
