= Northwest Crossroads Conference =

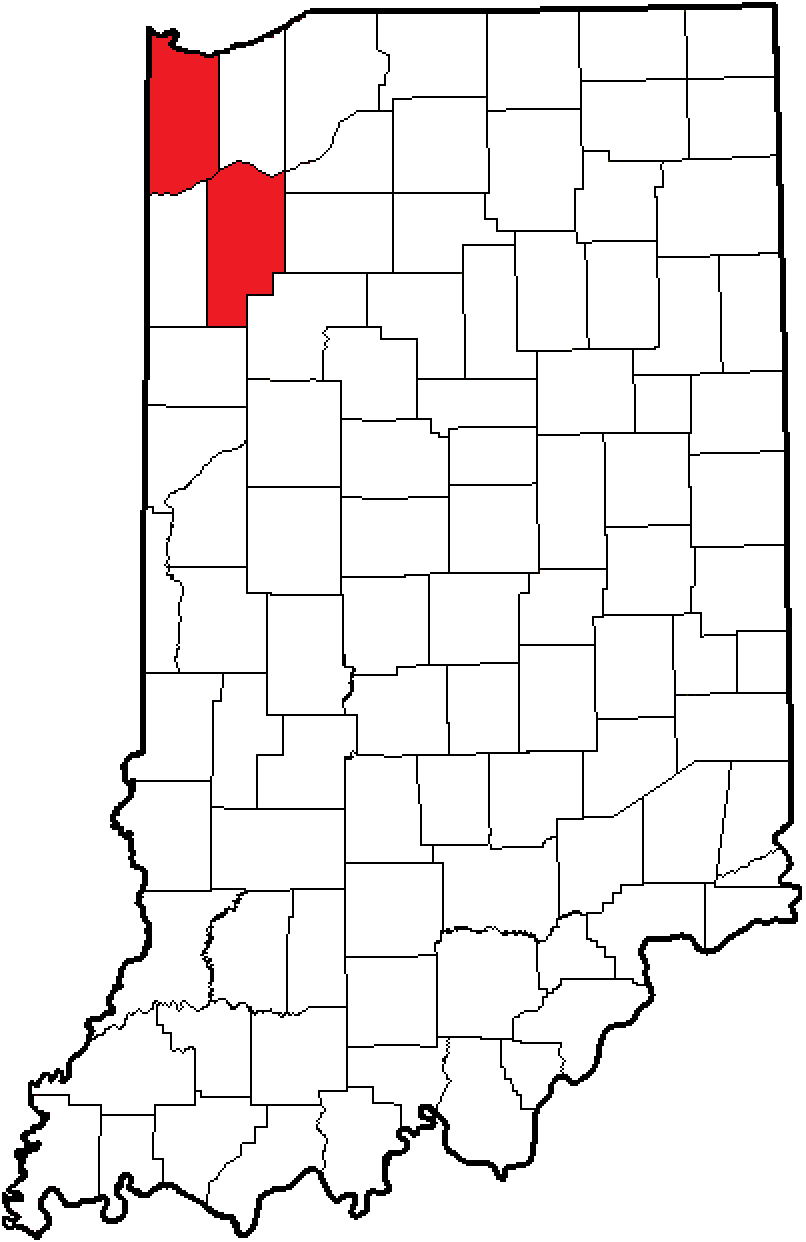
The Northwest Crossroads Conference in Indiana

The Northwest Crossroads Conference is an eight-member IHSAA-sanctioned athletic conference. Seven of the eight institutions are in Lake County, while the eighth, Kankakee Valley, is in neighboring Jasper County. This conference was created in 2007, following the disbandment of the Lake Athletic Conference. Griffith left the conference after the 2016–17 school year to join the Greater South Shore Athletic Conference (IHSAA).

Hanover Central, in southern Lake County, joined the conference as its seventh member starting in 2023. Illiana Christian High School joins the conference in the 2026–27 school year, leaving the Greater South Shore Conference.

== Membership ==
School	Location	Mascot	Colors	Enrollment 2024–25	IHSAA Class	# / County	Joined
Andrean	Merrillville	Fighting 59'ers		473	2A Football; 2A Basketball; 3A Baseball	45; Lake	2008
Hanover Central	Cedar Lake	Wildcats		859	3A Football; 3A Basketball	45; Lake	2023
Highland	Highland	Trojans		1006	4A Football; 3A Basketball	45; Lake	2008
Hobart	Hobart	Brickies		1,292	4A Football; 4A Basketball	45; Lake	2008
Illiana Christian	Dyer	Vikings		630	3A Football; 3A Basketball 2A Baseball	45; Lake	2025
Kankakee Valley	Wheatfield	Kougars		951	4A Football; 4A Basketball	37; Jasper	2008
Lowell	Lowell	Red Devils		1017	4A Football; 4A Basketball	45; Lake	2008
Munster	Munster	Mustangs		1,474	5A Football; 4A Basketball	45; Lake	2008

== Conference championships ==
=== Football ===
#	Team	Seasons
11	Andrean	2011, 2012*, 2013, 2014, 2018, 2020, 2021*, 2022*,2024*,2025, 2026
7	Lowell	2007*, 2008, 2009*, 2015, 2017, 2021*, 2022*
7	Hobart	2007*, 2012*, 2016*, 2019, 2021*, 2022*,2024*
2	Griffith	2010, 2016*
2	Hanover Central	2023,2024*
1	Kankakee Valley	2012*
1	Munster	2009*
0	Highland	

=== Boys basketball ===
#	Team	Seasons
17	Munster	2008, 2009, 2010, 2011, 2012, 2013, 2014, 2015, 2018*, 2019, 2020, 2021, 2022, 2023, 2024, 2025, 2026
2	Griffith	2016*, 2017
1	Lowell	2016*
1	Andrean	2018*
0	Highland	
0	Hobart	
0	Kankakee Valley	

=== Girls basketball ===
#	Team	Seasons
5	Kankakee Valley	2016, 2017, 2018, 2019, 2026
4	Andrean	2021, 2022, 2023, 2025
4	Hobart	2009*, 2010, 2011, 2015
3	Lowell	2012, 2013, 2014*
3	Munster	2009*, 2020, 2024
2	Highland	2008, 2014*
0	Griffith	
0	Hanover Central	

=== Girls Golf ===
#	Team	Seasons
0	Hobart	
0	Lowell	
0	Highland	
13	Munster	2009, 2010, 2011, 2012*, 2013, 2014, 2015, 2016, 2017*, 2018, 2019*,2020, 2021
0	Andrean	
0	Griffith	
3	Kankakee Valley	2012*, 2017*, 2019*

== State championships ==
=== Andrean (19) ===
- 1998 Softball (2A)
- 2004 Football (3A)
- 2005 Baseball (3A)
- 2007 Softball (3A)
- 2009 Baseball (3A)
- 2010 Baseball (3A)
- 2012 Softball (3A)
- 2013 Football (3A)
- 2014 Baseball (3A)
- 2015 Baseball (3A)
- 2016 Girls Soccer (1A)
- 2017 Girls Volleyball (2A)
- 2018 Baseball (3A)
- 2019 Boys basketball (2A)
- 2019 Baseball (3A)
- 2021 Girls Volleyball (2A)
- 2021 Football (2A)
- 2022 Baseball (3A)
- 2025 Baseball (3A)
- 2025 Football (2A)

=== Griffith (1) ===
- 1997 Football (4A)

=== Hobart (7) ===
- 1957 Boys Cross Country
- 1960 Boys Cross Country
- 1987 Football (4A)
- 1989 Football (4A)
- 1991 Football (4A)
- 1993 Football (4A)
- 2004 Gymnastics

=== Illiana Christian (2) ===
- 2022 Baseball (2A)
- 2023 Baseball (2A)

=== Lowell (1) ===
- 2005 Football (4A)

=== Munster (11) ===
- 1973 Boys Swimming & Diving
- 1974 Boys Swimming & Diving
- 1975 Boys Swimming & Diving
- 1976 Boys Swimming & Diving
- 1976 Girls Swimming & Diving
- 1977 Boys Swimming & Diving
- 1977 Girls Swimming & Diving
- 1978 Girls Swimming & Diving
- 1979 Boys Swimming & Diving
- 1980 Boys Swimming & Diving
- 2002 Baseball (4A)

== Resources ==
- IHSAA Conferences
- IHSAA Directory
