= School City of East Chicago =

School district in Indiana

Coordinates: 41°39′N 87°27′W

Address
- 1401 East 144th Street., 46312 East Chicago, Indiana United States

District information
- Type: Primary school and Secondary school
- Motto: "Learning for all...Whatever it takes"
- Grades: Pre-K-12
- President: Vanessa Hernandez-Orange
- Vice-president: Diane Smith

Students and staff
- Students: 3,892
- Teachers: 252
- District mascot: Cardinal
- Colors: Cardinal Red; Navy Blue

Other information
- Trustee: Joel Rodriguez
- Trustee: Jesse Gomez
- Board Secretary: Anton Williams
- Website: http://www.scec.k12.in.us/

School City of East Chicago often shortened to SCEC is a school district headquartered in East Chicago, Indiana, United States. The district serves all of East Chicago.

== Mandatory uniform policies ==
All district students, except those with parent or religious waivers and those with too much financial hardship to abide by the rule, are required to abide by a dress code that restricts colors worn by students. Students may wear solid red, white, or navy blue shirts, including collared shirts, T-shirts, blouses, turtlenecks, sweaters, and sweatshirts. Students may wear navy blue bottoms, including trousers, skirts, skorts, and shorts. Students may wear dress or athletic shoes colored navy blue, black, white, or red. Belts and shoelaces must be solid colors. Students may wear outfits from a "nationally recognized youth organization" such as the Boy Scouts of America or Girl Scouts of the USA on meeting days.

== Schools ==
School	City	Area	Team Name	Colors
Carrie Gosch Early Learning Center	East Chicago	Northwest Indiana	Cardinals	
Benjamin Harrison Elementary School	East Chicago	Northwest Indiana	Cardinals	
Abraham Lincoln Elementary School	East Chicago	Northwest Indiana	Cardinals	
William McKinley Elementary School	East Chicago	Northwest Indiana	Cardinals	
George Washington Elementary School	East Chicago	Northwest Indiana	Cardinals	
Joseph L. Block Middle School	East Chicago	Northwest Indiana	Cardinals	
Central High School (East Chicago, Indiana)	East Chicago	Northwest Indiana	Cardinals	

== Academics ==
The total student graduation rate for the district was 72.8%, as of the 2018–19 school year.
