= Calumet New Tech High School =

Public school in Lake County, Indiana, United States

Location
- 3900 Calhoun St; Gary, Lake County, Indiana 46408; United States
- 41°32′58″N 87°24′44″W

Information
- Type: Public
- Established: 1958
- School district: Lake Ridge Schools Corporation
- Principal: Chris Bajmakovich
- Teaching staff: 41.50 (FTE)
- Grades: 9–12
- Enrollment: 620 (2024–2025)
- Student to teacher ratio: 14.94
- Color
- Athletics conference: Greater South Shore
- Team name: Warriors
- Rival: Gary West Side High School
- Website: Official Site

Calumet New Tech High School, formerly Calumet High School, is a four-year (9–12) public high school of the Lake Ridge Schools Corporation in unincorporated Lake County, Indiana, near the city of Gary.

== See also ==
- List of high schools in Indiana
