= School City of Hammond =

School district in Indiana, United States

Coordinates: 41°36′N 87°31′W

Address
- 41 Williams Street Hammond, Lake County, Indiana; United States

District information
- Grades: PreK–12
- Schools: 17
- NCES District ID: 1804320

Students and staff
- Students: 11,275
- Teachers: 672.99 FTE
- Student–teacher ratio: 16.75:1

Other information
- Website: www.hammond.k12.in.us

School City of Hammond is a school district serving the city of Hammond, Indiana, United States. All of Hammond is in this district.

== Structure ==
The school year is divided into semesters. Students were previously required to wear school uniforms. However, as of the 2023–2024 school year, these are no longer required.

== Schools ==
All schools are in Hammond.

=== High schools ===
- Hammond High School
- Morton High School
- Area Career Center

=== Middle schools ===
- Henry W. Eggers Middle School
- Charles N. Scott Middle School

=== Primary schools ===
- Thomas Edison Elementary School
- Benjamin Franklin Elementary School
- Warren G. Harding Elementary School
- Joseph Hess Elementary School
- Washington Irving Elementary School
- Thomas Jefferson Elementary School
- Abraham Lincoln Elementary School
- Maywood Elementary School
- Oliver P. Morton Elementary School
- Frank O'Bannon Elementary School
- Lew Wallace Elementary School
