= West Side Leadership Academy =

Location
- 9th & Gerry St; Gary, Lake County, Indiana 46406; United States; 41.595006°N 87.407737°W

Information
- Type: Public high school
- Established: 1968
- School district: Gary Community School Corporation
- NCES School ID: 180387000648
- Principal: Brandi Herrod
- Teaching staff: 68.50 (on an FTE basis)
- Grades: 9–12
- Enrollment: 1,232 (2024–25)
- Student to teacher ratio: 17.99
- Colors: Orange and blue
- Athletics conference: Great Lakes
- Team name: Cougars
- Website: www.garycsc.k12.in.us/o/wsla

West Side Leadership Academy is a four-year (9–12) public school of the Gary Community School Corporation in Gary, Indiana.

== Notable alumni ==
- James Black, former NFL player
- Dana Evans, WNBA player
- LaTroy Hawkins, MLB player
- Jon'Vea Johnson, NFL player
- Lonnie Johnson Jr., NFL player
- Brandon Moore, former NFL player
- Quimari Peterson, basketball player

== See also ==
- List of high schools in Indiana
