= Deep Creek =

Deep Creek may refer to:

== Communities ==
=== Australia ===
- Deep Creek, Queensland
- Deep Creek, South Australia
- Deep Creek, Victoria now Eganstown, Victoria

==== New South Wales ====
- Deep Creek, New South Wales (Kempsey)
- Deep Creek, New South Wales (Clarence Valley)
- Deep Creek, New South Wales (Kyogle)

=== Canada ===
- Deep Creek, Alberta, an unincorporated area

=== United States ===
- Deep Creek, California, now Cedarville
- Deep Creek, Florida, an unincorporated community in Charlotte County
- Deep Creek, Virginia, a former unincorporated town of the former Norfolk County
- Deep Creek, Accomack County, Virginia, a census-designated place
- Deep Creek, Washington, an unincorporated community in Spokane County
- Deep Creek Township (disambiguation)

== Bodies of water ==
=== Australia ===
- Deep Creek (Melbourne), a tributary of the Maribyrnong River
- Deep Creek Dam (Tumbarumba, New South Wales), a dam on Deep Creek (Tooma River tributary)

=== Bahamas ===
- Deep Creek (Bahamas)

=== United States ===
- Deep Creek Hot Springs, California
- Deep Creek (Mojave River tributary), San Bernardino County, California
- Deep Creek (Colorado River tributary), Garfield and Eagle counties, Colorado
- Deep Creek (Appoquinimink River tributary), New Castle County, Delaware
- Deep Creek (Nanticoke River tributary), Sussex County, Delaware
- Deep Creek (Great Salt Lake), Idaho and Utah
- Deep Creek Lake, Maryland
- Deep Creek (Montana), a stream in Flathead County, Montana
- Deep Creek (Plum Creek tributary), a stream in Brown County, Nebraska
- Deep Creek (Little River tributary), a stream in Hoke County, North Carolina
- Deep Creek (Mahantango Creek tributary), Dauphin County, Pennsylvania
- Deep Creek (Pine Creek tributary), Schuylkill County, Pennsylvania
- Deep Creek (Soque River tributary), Georgia
- Deep Creek (Owyhee County, Idaho), a tributary of the Owyhee River in southwestern Idaho
- Deep Creek (Texas), a tributary of the Texas Colorado River
- Deep Creek (Trinity River tributary), a tributary of the Texas Trinity River
- Deep Creek (Tooele County, Utah)
- Deep Creek (Appomattox River tributary), Virginia
- Deep Creek (Washington), a tributary of the Spokane River

== Other places ==
- Deep Creek Conservation Park, South Australia, Australia

=== United States ===
- Deep Creek Mountains, Utah
- Deep Creek State Recreation Area, Alaska
- Deep Creek Preserve (Desoto County, Florida), a 2,000 acre preserve
- Deep Creek Preserve (Volusia County, Florida), an 8,040 acre preserve
- Deep Creek High School, Virginia, USA

== Other uses ==
- Deep Creek (2010 novel)
- Deep Creek massacre, occurring May 1887 in Oregon

== See also ==
- Deep River (disambiguation)
- Deep (disambiguation)
- Creek (disambiguation)
