= Hobart Township, Lake County, Indiana =

Hobart Township
- Township
- Logo

- Coordinates: 41°32′48″N 87°15′53″W
- Country: United States
- State: Indiana
- County: Lake

Government
  - Type: Indiana township

Area
  - Total: 25.98 sq mi (67.3 km^{2})
  - Land: 25.47 sq mi (66.0 km^{2})
  - Water: 0.51 sq mi (1.3 km^{2})
- Elevation: 627 ft (191 m)

Population (2020)
  - Total: 40,652
  - Density: 1,547.4/sq mi (597.5/km^{2})
- FIPS code: 18-34132
- GNIS feature ID: 453414
- Website: hobarttownship.org

Hobart Township is one of eleven townships in Lake County, Indiana. As of the 2010 census, its population was 39,417 and it contained 16,366 housing units.

Historical population
Census	Pop.	Note	%±
1890	2,197		—
1900	2,718		23.7%
1910	3,729		37.2%
1920	5,621		50.7%
1930	9,135		62.5%
1940	12,472		36.5%
1950	21,871		75.4%
1960	39,223		79.3%
1970	40,825		4.1%
1980	42,548		4.2%
1990	38,942		−8.5%
2000	39,636		1.8%
2010	39,417		−0.6%
2020	40,652		3.1%
Source: US Decennial Census

== Geography ==
According to the 2010 census, the township has a total area of 25.98 square miles (67.3 km^{2}), of which 25.47 square miles (66.0 km^{2}) (or 98.04%) is land and 0.51 square miles (1.3 km^{2}) (or 1.96%) is water. It includes most of the City of Hobart, the entire City of Lake Station and Town of New Chicago, and a small portion of the City of Gary, as well as a small unincorporated area known as Viking Village. Its public school districts include the School City of Hobart, the River Forest Community School Corporation, and the Lake Station Community Schools, each with one high school: Hobart High School, River Forest High School, and Thomas A. Edison Junior-Senior High School.

=== Cities ===
- Gary (small portion)
- Hobart (vast majority)
- Lake Station (vast majority)

=== Towns ===
- New Chicago

=== Other Communities ===
- Liverpool at 41.552536°N 87.294762°W
