= Cool Branch (Tubbs Branch tributary) =

Stream in Delaware, US

Cool Branch Tributary to Tubbs Branch
- Location of Cool Branch mouth Cool Branch (Tubbs Branch tributary) (the United States)

Location
- Country: United States
- State: Delaware
- County: Sussex

Physical characteristics
- Source: Tyndall and James Ditch divide
  - location: about 2 miles northwest of Sycamore, Delaware
  - coordinates: 38°36′24″N 075°31′39″W
  - elevation: 39 ft (12 m)
- Mouth: Tubbs Branch
  - location: about 0.5 miles south of Concord, Delaware
  - coordinates: 38°37′55″N 075°33′39″W
  - elevation: 18 ft (5.5 m)
- Length: 2.85 mi (4.59 km)
- Basin size: 2.24 square miles (5.8 km^{2})
- Discharge
  - location: Tubbs Branch
  - average: 2.71 cu ft/s (0.077 m^{3}/s) at mouth with Tubbs Branch

Basin features
- Progression: Tubbs Branch → Deep Creek → Nanticoke River → Chesapeake Bay
- River system: Nanticoke River
- Tributaries
  - left: unnamed tributaries
  - right: unnamed tributaries
- Bridges: Cool Branch Road, Fire Tower Road, Bunny Lane

Cool Branch is a 2.85 mi (4.59 km) long 2nd order tributary to Tubbs Branch in Sussex County, Delaware.

== Course ==
Cool Branch rises about 2 miles northwest of Sycamore, Delaware, and then flows northwest to join Tubbs Branch about 0.5 miles south of Concord.

== Watershed ==
Cool Branch drains 2.24 square miles (5.8 km^{2}) of area, receives about 45.0 in/year of precipitation, has a wetness index of 681.87, and is about 8% forested.

== See also ==
- List of rivers of Delaware
