= Graham Branch (Tubbs Branch tributary) =

Stream in Delaware, USA

Graham Branch Tributary to Tubbs Branch
- Location of Graham Branch mouth Graham Branch (Tubbs Branch tributary) (the United States)

Location
- Country: United States
- State: Delaware
- County: Sussex

Physical characteristics
- Source: Gum Branch divide
  - location: about 1 mile east of Pineridge, Delaware
  - coordinates: 38°35′58″N 075°33′32″W
  - elevation: 40 ft (12 m)
- Mouth: Tubbs Branch
  - location: about 0.5 miles south of Concord, Delaware
  - coordinates: 38°32′55″N 075°33′40″W
  - elevation: 18 ft (5.5 m)
- Length: 2.84 mi (4.57 km)
- Basin size: 1.32 square miles (3.4 km^{2})
- Discharge
  - location: Tubbs Branch
  - average: 1.60 cu ft/s (0.045 m^{3}/s) at mouth with Tubbs Branch

Basin features
- Progression: Tubbs Branch → Deep Creek → Nanticoke River → Chesapeake Bay
- River system: Nanticoke River
- Tributaries
  - left: unnamed tributaries
  - right: unnamed tributaries
- Bridges: Waller Road, Dillards Road, Airport Road

Graham Branch is a 2.84 mi (4.57 km) long 2nd order tributary to Tubbs Branch in Sussex County, Delaware.

== Course ==
Graham Branch rises about 1 mile east of Pineridge, Delaware, and then flows north to join Tubbs Branch about 0.5 miles south of Concord.

== Watershed ==
Graham Branch drains 1.32 square miles (3.4 km^{2}) of area, receives about 45.0 in/year of precipitation, has a wetness index of 641.33, and is about 6% forested.

== See also ==
- List of rivers of Delaware
