= Deep River =

Deep River may refer to:

== Rivers ==
- The Deep River (Western Australia), Australia

=== United States ===
- The Deep River (Indiana), a tributary of the Little Calumet River in northern Indiana
- The Deep River (Iowa), a minor tributary of the English River in the United States
- The Deep River (North Carolina), in the United States
- The Deep River (Washington), a minor tributary of the Columbia River in the U.S. state of Washington

== Places ==
- Deep River, Ontario, Canada; a town in Renfrew County

=== United States ===
- Deep River, Connecticut, a town in Middlesex County
  - Deep River Center, Connecticut, a census-designated place (CDP) in Middlesex County
- Deep River, Indiana, an unincorporated place in Lake County
- Deep River, Iowa, a city in Poweshiek County
- Deep River Township, Michigan, a township in Arenac County
- Deep River, Washington, a city in Washington
- Deep River State Trail, a trail along the Deep River in North Carolina.

== Music ==
- Deep River (David Murray album) or the title song, 1988
- Deep River (Hikaru Utada album) or the title song, 2002
- Deep River (Jon Allen album) or the title song, 2014
- "Deep River" (song), an African-American spiritual

== Literature ==
- Deep River (novel), a 1993 novel by Shusaku Endo
- Deep River, a novel by Clement Woods featuring a fictionalized character based on Gladys Bentley
- Deep River, a 2019 novel by Karl Marlantes
- Deep Rivers (Spanish: Los ríos profundos), a 1958 novel by José María Arguedas

== Other ==
- Deep River (film), a 1995 film based on the eponymous Shusaku Endo novel and directed by Kei Kumai
- Deep River Rock, a brand name for water produced by Coca-Cola Bottlers Ulster Ltd.

== See also ==
- Deep Creek (disambiguation)
- Deep Fork River
- "River Deep – Mountain High", a 1966 single by Ike & Tina Turner
- Deep (disambiguation)
- River (disambiguation)
