= Old Furnace =

Old Furnace may refer to:

== United Kingdom ==
- The Old Furnace, Staffordshire, England

== United States ==
- Old Furnace, Delaware, Sussex County
- Old Furnace, Massachusetts, a village in the town of Hardwick, Worcester County
- Old Furnace, Pennsylvania, Union County
- Old Furnace State Park, a public recreation area in Killingly, Connecticut
- Old Furnace Wildlife Area, a state wildlife area in Sussex County, Delaware

== Other places ==
- Old Furnace, Ironbridge, a village in Shropshire, England
