= List of Delaware state wildlife areas =

The U.S. state of Delaware has 19 wildlife and conservation areas, as of 2026. Each of the wildlife areas is operated and maintained by the Delaware Division of Parks and Recreation, a branch of the Department of Natural Resources and Environmental Control (DNREC).

The state wildlife system includes over 68,000 acres of public land set aside to conserve Delaware's fish and wildlife populations. Unlike Delaware's state parks, which are geared to more general outdoor recreation, the wildlife and conservation areas are managed primarily for recreational activities such as hunting, fishing, and birding, similar to the National Wildlife Refuges operated by the U.S. Fish and Wildlife Service.

== State wildlife & conservation areas ==
Area Name	County	Date founded	Size	Description
C&D Canal Conservation Area	New Castle		5,090-acre (2,060 ha)	Preserves land along both sides of the C&D Canal, which connects the Delaware Bay to the Chesapeake Bay.
Augustine Wildlife Area	New Castle		3,130-acre (1,270 ha)	Preserves land along the Delaware Bay and the Chesapeake & Delaware Canal.
Cedar Swamp Wildlife Area	New Castle		5,515-acre (2,232 ha)	Preserves land along the Delaware Bay.
Eagles Nest Wildlife Area	New Castle		835-acre (338 ha)	Woods and wetlands near Blackbird State Forest.
DNERR Blackbird Creek Reserve	New Castle		583-acre (236 ha)	Preserves uplands and marsh in Townsend, Delaware.
Woodland Beach Wildlife Area	Kent		6,320-acre (2,560 ha)	Preserves a stretch of wetland along the Delaware Bay.
Blackiston Wildlife Area	Kent		2,199-acre (890 ha)	
Little Creek Wildlife Area	Kent	1957	4,721-acre (1,911 ha)	Preserves a stretch of wetland along the Delaware Bay.
Ted Harvey Conservation Area	Kent	1979	2,661-acre (1,077 ha)	Preserves land along the Delaware Bay and the St. Jones River. Named after the founder of Delaware Wild Lands.
Tappahanna Wildlife Area	Kent			
Norman G. Wilder Wildlife Area	Kent	1940	4,441-acre (1,797 ha)	Contains some of the largest intact blocks of forest in the state wildlife area system. Named for the first Director of the Division of Fish and Wildlife.
McGinnis Pond Wildlife Area	Kent		31-acre (13 ha)	A small fishing pond.
Milford Neck Wildlife Area	Kent, Sussex	1979	5,038-acre (2,039 ha)	The disconnected pieces of this wildlife area preserve land around the Murderkill River, the Mispillion River, and the Delaware Bay.
Prime Hook State Wildlife Area	Sussex	1958	698-acre (282 ha)	Preserves land adjacent to the Prime Hook National Wildlife Refuge along the Delaware Bay.
Marshy Hope Wildlife Area	Sussex	2000	1,079-acre (437 ha)	Preserves woods and wetlands near the Marshyhope Creek along the border with Maryland.
Industrial Forest Lands	Sussex	1992	1,021-acre (413 ha)	Forestland formerly leased from pulp companies.
Old Furnace Wildlife Area	Sussex	2000	2,237-acre (905 ha)	Preserves woodland near the Nanticoke River.
Nanticoke Wildlife Area	Sussex	1967	4,510-acre (1,830 ha)	Preserves portions of the Nanticoke River and surrounding land.
Midlands Wildlife Area	Sussex	2000	4,083-acre (1,652 ha)	Preserves large pine forest tract located in the middle of the Indian River, Nanticoke River, and Pocomoke River.
Assawoman Wildlife Area	Sussex	1954	2,899-acre (1,173 ha)	Preserves portions of Little Assawoman Bay and Indian River Bay and the surrounding land.

== See also ==
- Fishing in Delaware
