= Deep River (Indiana) =

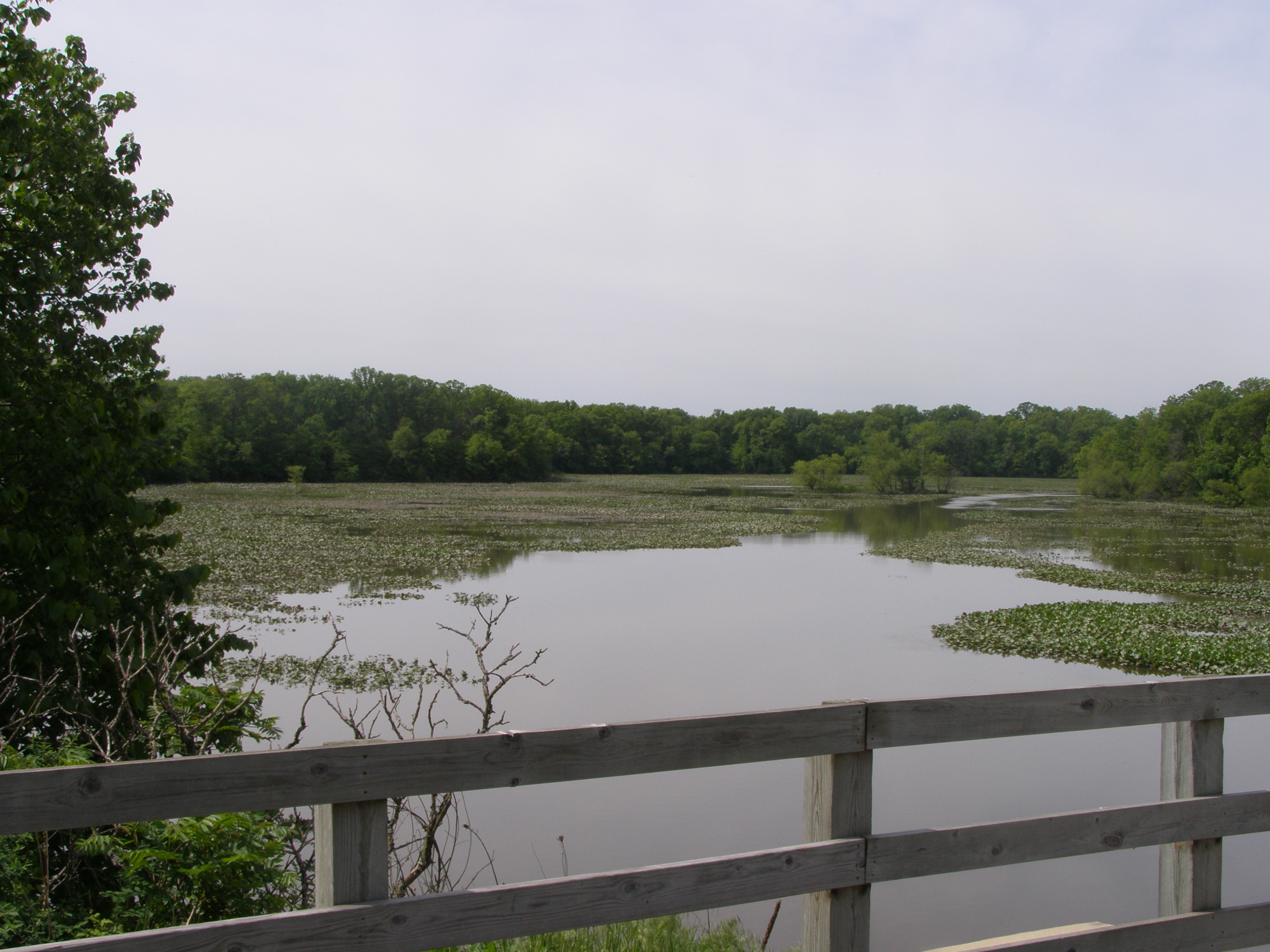
- Lake George, a 275 acre man-made lake on Deep River, in Hobart, Indiana.

Location
- Country: United States
- State: Indiana
- Cities: Crown Point, Hobart, Lake Station

Physical characteristics
- Source
  - location: Indiana
  - coordinates: 41°25′25″N 087°19′09″W
  - elevation: 675 ft (206 m)
- Mouth: Confluence of Deep River with Little Calumet River
  - location: Lake County, Indiana
  - coordinates: 41°34′16″N 087°17′32″W
  - elevation: 591 ft (180 m)

Basin features
- Tributaries
  - left: Turkey Creek
  - right: Deer Creek, Duck Creek

Deep River is a river that flows 29.5 miles (47.5 km) northeast to the Little Calumet River in Lake County in northern Indiana in the United States. It is part of a fluvial system that drains about 10% of northern Indiana to Lake Michigan at Port of Indiana-Burns Harbor.

== History ==
In the summer of 1834, the first Lake County settler and homesteader, William Ross, settled near the confluence of Turkey Creek with Deep River. Two years later in 1836, land was purchased from the Potawatomi at the confluence of Deep River with the Little Calumet River, and the town of Liverpool was platted, and later purchased by George Earle. Next, Earle moved two miles southeast and platted Hobart in 1848. Liverpool was briefly the county seat, soon displaced by Crown Point. John Wood laid a mill claim in 1835 which he expanded in 1837 to a saw-mill and a grist mill. This site was originally called Woodvale, but is now known as Deep River, Indiana, and is now the site of the Deep River County Park, where the original grist mill has been rebuilt. The local vintage Baseball team are known as "the Grinders".

== Watershed ==
The Deep River sources at the confluence of Main Beaver Dam Ditch and Smith Ditch near Interstate 65 on the east side of Crown Point and flows east and northeast to man-made Lake George in Hobart, formed by a dam initially constructed in 1840 by George Earle. This narrow, sinuous reservoir is approximately 5 kilometres (3.1 mi) long and 300 metres (980 ft) wide. It meanders north and northeast to join the Little Calumet River (LCR) ½ mile east of Interstate 65 and just north of Interstate 80/94 in Lake Station. From this confluence, the LCR flows east in a man-made channel known as "Burns Ditch", a channelized section of the LCR that connects with the East Arm Little Calumet River and then exits north to Lake Michigan via a man-made outlet known as Port of Indiana-Burns Harbor in Portage, Indiana.

Deep River's main tributaries are Deep Creek, Turkey Creek, and Duck Creek.

== Ecology ==
Adjacent wetlands are found on over 10% of the Deep River watershed. Save the Dunes has been awarded funding from the Chi-Cal Rivers Fund to restore 18 acres of farmland to marshland in Hobart Marsh, adjacent to Lake George and Deep River. When completed in 2018 it will be donated to the Indiana Dunes National Lakeshore. Riparian trees of Deep River reflect typical bottomland species of elm, ash and maple. Other species associated are sycamore, box elder, river birch, and willow.

Burns Waterway is designated by the DNR as a salmonid (trout and salmon) stream. These fish are known to migrate up Deep River as far as the Lake George dam.

== Recreation ==
Deep River is quite muddy and moves very slowly, usually less than one mile per hour. Some of the river is choked with a series of log jams making navigation difficult. Best canoeing levels occur in the spring. Summer may make water levels too low for canoeing.

== Gallery ==
Images of the Deep River

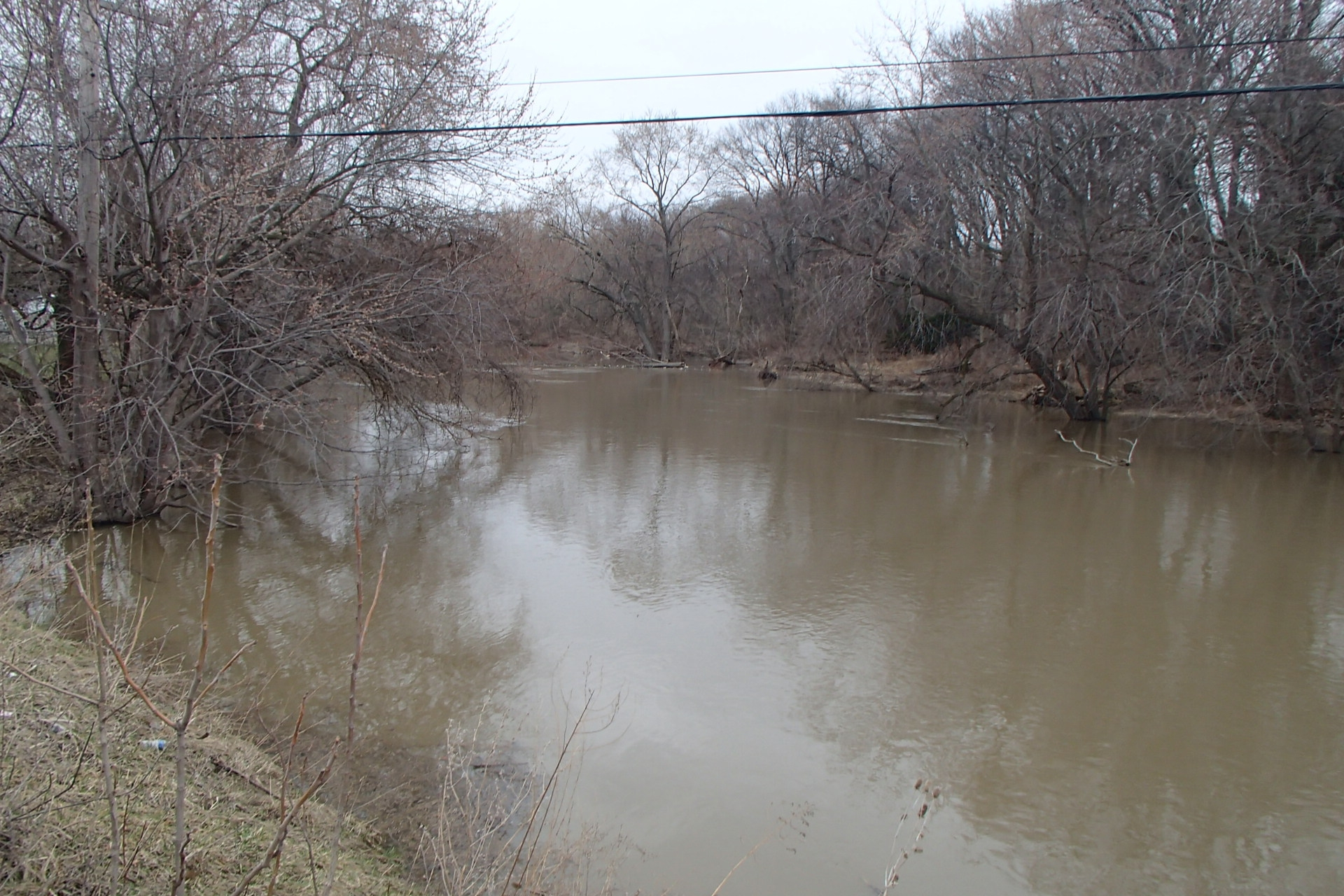
Deep river between Hobart and Lake Station

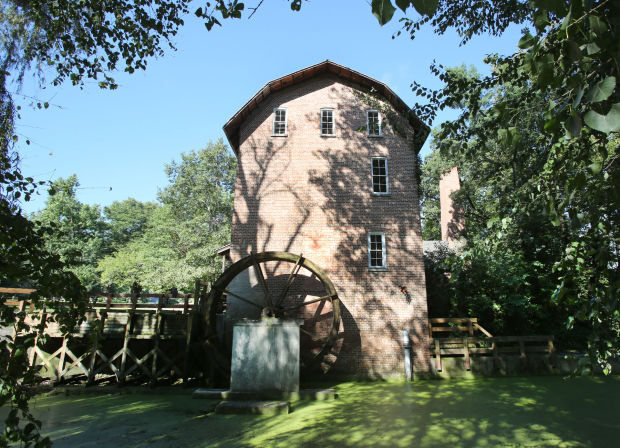
Wood's Grist Mill Built in 1837–1838 by John Wood, re-built in 1876 and recently restored by Lake County Parks. It was the first industry in the county.

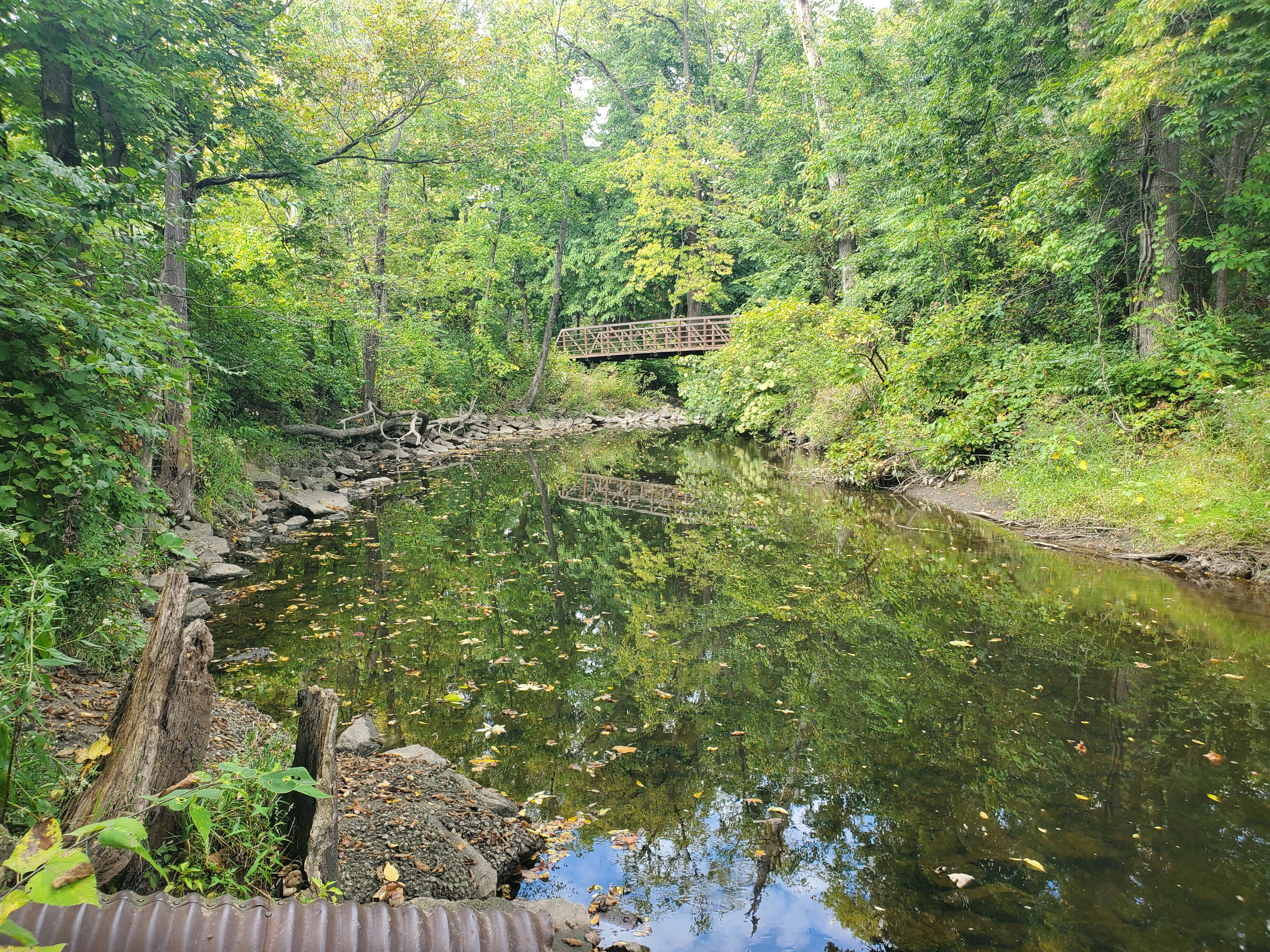
Looking downstream (north) from near the parking lot in Deep River County Park

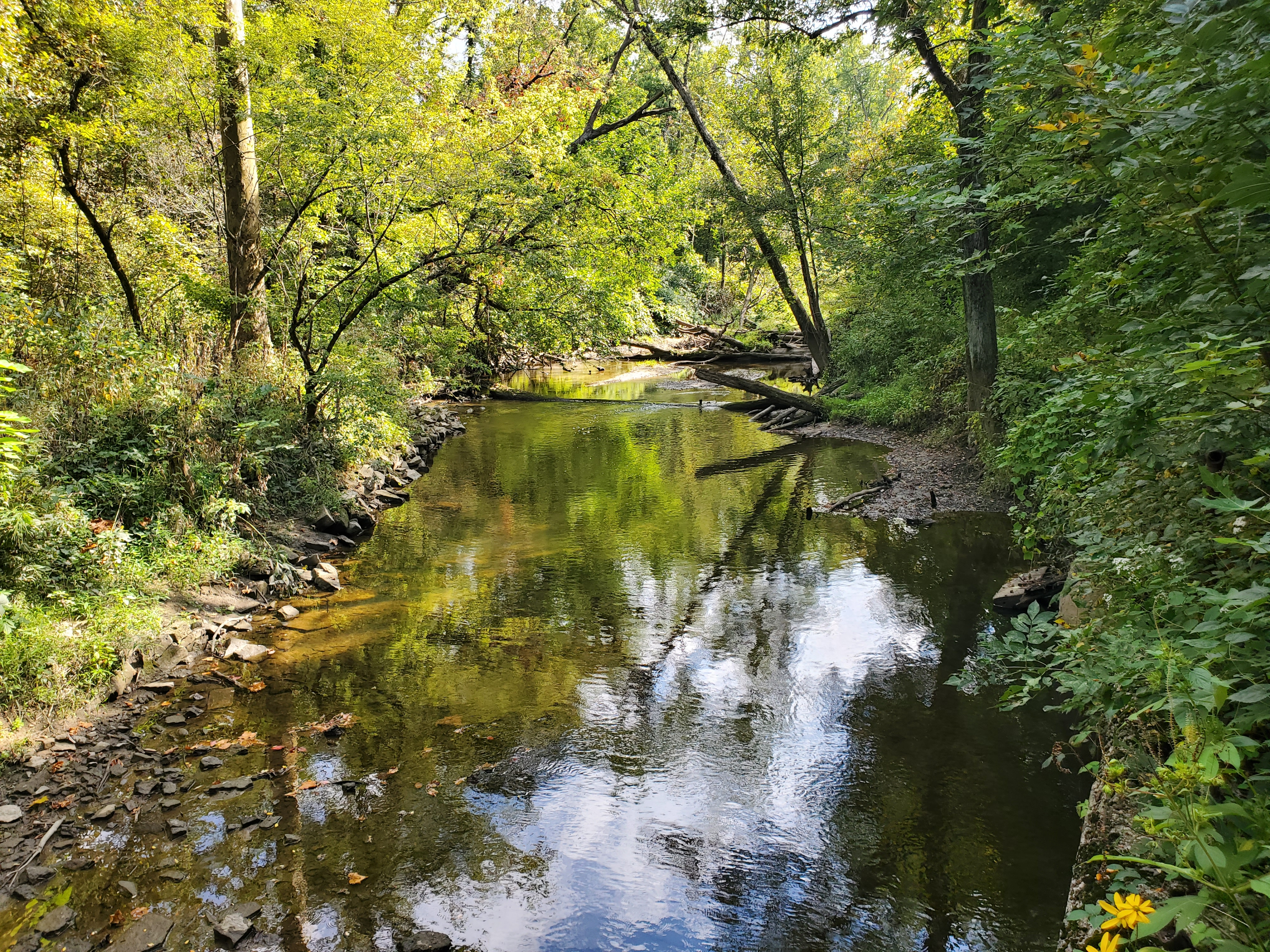
Looking upstream (south) from train track tressle in Deep River County Park

== See also ==
- Liverpool, Indiana
- Little Calumet River
