= Redden, Delaware =

Unincorporated community in Delaware, United States

- Unincorporated community
- Location within Delaware Location within the United States
- Coordinates: 38°44′29″N 75°25′02″W
- Country: United States
- State: Delaware
- County: Sussex
- Elevation: 46 ft (14 m)
- Time zone: UTC-5 (Eastern (EST))
  - Summer (DST): UTC-4 (EDT)
- Area code: 302
- GNIS feature ID: 216191

Redden is an unincorporated community in Sussex County, Delaware, United States. The community became an important railroad center on the Junction and Breakwater Railroad in the 1800s. The site of a historic 19th-century church and a World War II mess hall, Redden lost its post office and school in the 1930s.

== Geography ==
Redden is located along U.S. Route 113 in the Georgetown Hundred, north of Georgetown, amidst tracts which comprise the Redden State Forest.

== History ==
=== 1800s ===
The original McColley's Chapel, a Methodist church in Redden, was built sometime after the land was donated, in 1857. The original building was replaced with the current chapel in 1898.

Redden was originally known as Carey. It was renamed in honor of Col. William O. Redden, who had prominent role in Sussex County in the mid-19th century. The Redden post office began operation in 1868.

In 1874, Redden was described as a post station on the Junction and Breakwater Railroad.

Redden's population was 50 residents in 1890.

=== 1900s ===
The population of Redden had grown slightly to 57 in 1900. In 1904, Redden was described as a post village on the Philadelphia, Baltimore and Washington Railroad. The right-of-way is used for freight transport operated by the auspices of Delmarva Central Railroad.

The Redden School, numbered 180, was still in operation in 1928, but by 1930, a recommendation was made by the Delaware State Board of Education to close the Redden School.

Redden Community Hall, used as a mess hall during World War II, is "a rare surviving example of an intact Civilian Conservation Corps (CCC) camp facility in Delaware". Around this time, the Redden post office closed; it ceased operations in 1933.

=== 2000s ===
McColley's Chapel was listed on the National Register of Historic Places on November 30, 2011. The church is still in operation and is under the Peninsula-Delaware Conference of the United Methodist Church.

Redden Community Hall is still used as a polling location.

== See also ==
- Redden Forest Education Center
