= Diep =

Diep, DIEP, or Diệp may refer to:

- Deep (2005 film) (Dutch: Diep)
- DIEP flap, a type of breast reconstruction
- Diep.io, a multiplayer browser game
- Ye (surname) (Vietnamese: Diệp)
  - Bạch Diệp (1929–2013), Vietnamese film director
  - Tyler Diep, Vietnamese-American politician

== See also ==
- Diep River (disambiguation)
