= Tubbs Branch (Deep Creek tributary) =

Stream in Delaware, USA

Tubbs Branch Tributary to Deep Creek
- Location of Tubbs Branch mouth Tubbs Branch (Deep Creek tributary) (the United States)

Location
- Country: United States
- State: Delaware
- County: Sussex

Physical characteristics
- Source: confluence of Cool Branch and Graham Branch
  - location: about 0.5 miles south of Concord, Delaware
  - coordinates: 38°37′55″N 075°33′40″W
  - elevation: 18 ft (5.5 m)
- Mouth: Deep Creek
  - location: Concord, Delaware
  - coordinates: 38°38′33″N 075°33′52″W
  - elevation: 0 ft (0 m)
- Length: 0.92 mi (1.48 km)
- Basin size: 3.85 square miles (10.0 km^{2})
- Discharge
  - location: Deep Creek
  - average: 4.65 cu ft/s (0.132 m^{3}/s) at mouth with Deep Creek

Basin features
- Progression: Tubbs Branch → Nanticoke River → Chesapeake Bay → Atlantic Ocean
- River system: Nanticoke River
- Tributaries
  - left: Cool Branch
  - right: Graham Branch
- Bridges: Bethel-Concord Road, DE 20

Tubbs Branch is a 0.92 mi (1.48 km) long 2nd order tributary to Deep Creek in Sussex County, Delaware.

== Course ==
Tubbs Branch is formed at the confluence of Cool Branch and Graham Branch about 0.5 miles south of Concord, Delaware, and then flows north to join Deep Creek at Concord.

== Watershed ==
Tubbs Branch drains 3.85 square miles (10.0 km^{2}) of area, receives about 45.0 in/year of precipitation, has a wetness index of 656.78, and is about 8% forested.

== See also ==
- List of rivers of Delaware
