= Baker Mill Branch =

Stream in Delaware, USA

Baker Mill Branch Tributary to Deep Creek
- Location of Baker Mill Branch mouth Baker Mill Branch (the United States)

Location
- Country: United States
- State: Delaware
- County: Sussex

Physical characteristics
- Source: confluence of Old Ditch and Black Savannah Ditch
  - location: about 0.5 miles southeast of Concord, Delaware
  - coordinates: 38°37′28″N 075°31′21″W
  - elevation: 23 ft (7.0 m)
- Mouth: Deep Creek
  - location: about 0.5 miles east of Concord, Delaware
  - coordinates: 38°38′32″N 075°32′32″W
  - elevation: 8 ft (2.4 m)
- Length: 3.53 mi (5.68 km)
- Basin size: 3.23 square miles (8.4 km^{2})
- Discharge
  - location: Deep Creek
  - average: 3.93 cu ft/s (0.111 m^{3}/s) at mouth with Deep Creek

Basin features
- Progression: Deep Creek → Nanticoke River → Chesapeake Bay → Atlantic Ocean
- River system: Nanticoke River
- Tributaries
  - left: Black Savannah Ditch
  - right: Old Ditch
- Bridges: Baker Mill Road

Baker Mill Branch is a 3.53-mile-long (5.68 km) second-order tributary to Deep Creek in Sussex County, Delaware. This is the only stream of this name in the United States.

== Course ==
Baker Mill Branch is formed at the confluence of Old Ditch and Black Savannah Ditch about 0.5 miles (0.80 km) southeast of Concord, Delaware, and then flows north-northwest to join Deep Creek about 0.5 miles (0.80 km) east of Concord.

== Watershed ==
Baker Mill Branch drains 3.23 square miles (8.4 km^{2}) of area, receives about 45.1 in/year (115 cm/year) of precipitation, has a wetness index of 705.67, and is about 19% forested.

== See also ==
- List of rivers of Delaware
