= Shorts Ditch =

Stream in Delaware, USA

Shorts Ditch Tributary to Deep Creek
- Location of Shorts Ditch mouth Shorts Ditch (the United States)

Location
- Country: United States
- State: Delaware
- County: Sussex

Physical characteristics
- Source: Gravelly Branch divide
  - location: about 2.5 miles southeast of Coverdale Crossroads, Delaware
  - coordinates: 38°41′59″N 075°29′54″W
  - elevation: 35 ft (11 m)
- Mouth: Deep Creek
  - location: about 0.5 miles northeast of Old Furnace, Delaware
  - coordinates: 38°40′25″N 075°30′19″W
  - elevation: 20 ft (6.1 m)
- Length: 2.14 mi (3.44 km)
- Basin size: 2.53 square miles (6.6 km^{2})
- Discharge
  - location: Deep Creek
  - average: 3.08 cu ft/s (0.087 m^{3}/s) at mouth with Deep Creek

Basin features
- Progression: southwest
- River system: Nanticoke River
- Tributaries
  - left: unnamed tributaries
  - right: unnamed tributaries
- Bridges: Cokesbury Road

Shorts Ditch is a 2.14 mi (3.44 km) long 1st order tributary to Deep Creek in Sussex County, Delaware. This is the only stream of this name in the United States.

== Course ==
Shorts Ditch rises on the Gravelly Branch divide 2.5 miles southeast of Coverdale Crossroads, and then flows southwest to join Deep Creek about 0.5 miles northeast of Old Furnace.

== Watershed ==
Shorts Ditch drains 2.53 square miles (6.6 km^{2}) of area, receives about 45.1 in/year of precipitation, has a wetness index of 738.93, and is about 22% forested.

== See also ==
- List of rivers of Delaware
