= Assawoman Wildlife Area =

Wildlife area in Sussex County, Delaware

- Location within Delaware Location within the United States
- Location: Sussex County, Delaware
- Nearest city: Frankford, Delaware
- Coordinates: 38.499443°N 75.078764°W
- Area: 3,100 acres (13 km^{2})
- Governing body: Delaware Division of Fish and Wildlife

Assawoman Wildlife Area is a state wildlife area located in Sussex County, Delaware located near Frankfort, Delaware and Little Assawoman Bay. It is made up of three large tracts of land that total 3,100 acres (1,300 ha) that were originally former farms that were lost due to the Great Depression, and managed by the Delaware Department of Natural Resources and Environmental Control (DNREC). The wildlife areas name came from the nearby Little Assawoman Bay which was originally named Assateague, an Algonkian word meaning "stream or inlet in the middle" before it was changed to another Algonkian name which means "midway fishing stream."

In 2019, fifty-two areas were purchased alongside the Piney Point tract of the wildlife area by a joint effort by the Center for the Inland Bays and the DNREC's program the Delaware Open Space Program. The additional land expanded the wildlife area by 11% and another joint program between the Center for the Inland Bays and the Division of Fish and Wildlife planted 16,600 trees on sixteen of the fifty-two areas. The reforestation effort by the state was done to protect and support breeding populations of local animals such as the eastern box turtle and migratory species like the wood thrush, and to improve water quality in the Indian River. Additional conservation efforts were made by creating a living shoreline with salt marsh grasses to create a 13,000 ft^{2} (1,200 m^{2}) separation between a freshwater pond and a saltwater tributary. In 2020, it was reported that the Delmarva fox squirrel would be transplanted into the wildlife area from Dorchester County, Maryland in an effort to increase the population in Delaware. Prior to this transplant the squirrel was only seen in the Prime Hook National Wildlife Refuge and the Naticoke Wildlife Area.
