= Rum Bridge Branch =

Stream in Delaware, USA

Rum Bridge Branch Tributary to Deep Creek
- Location of Rum Bridge Branch mouth Rum Bridge Branch (the United States)

Location
- Country: United States
- State: Delaware
- County: Sussex

Physical characteristics
- Source: Raccoon Ditch divide
  - location: McDonalds Crossroads, Delaware
  - coordinates: 38°40′02″N 075°26′32″W
  - elevation: 40 ft (12 m)
- Mouth: Deep Creek
  - location: about 1 mile northeast of Old Furnace, Delaware
  - coordinates: 38°40′35″N 075°29′13″W
  - elevation: 23 ft (7.0 m)
- Length: 2.63 mi (4.23 km)
- Basin size: 2.53 square miles (6.6 km^{2})
- Discharge
  - location: Deep Creek
  - average: 3.11 cu ft/s (0.088 m^{3}/s) at mouth with Deep Creek

Basin features
- Progression: Deep Creek → Nanticoke River → Chesapeake Bay → Atlantic Ocean
- River system: Nanticoke River
- Tributaries
  - left: unnamed tributaries
  - right: unnamed tributaries
- Bridges: Raccoon Ditch Road, Rum Bridge Road

Rum Bridge Branch is a 2.63 mi (4.23 km) long 2nd order tributary to Deep Creek in Sussex County, Delaware. This is the only stream of this name in the United States.

== Course ==
Rum Bridge Branch rises on the Raccoon Branch divide at McDonalds Crossroads, Delaware, and then flows west-northwest to join Deep Creek about 1 mile northeast of Old Furnace.

== Watershed ==
Rum Bridge Branch drains 2.53 square miles (6.6 km^{2}) of area, receives about 45.1 in/year of precipitation, has a wetness index of 667.16, and is about 33% forested.

== See also ==
- List of rivers of Delaware
