= Tyndall Branch =

Tyndall Branch Tributary to Deep Creek
- Location within Delaware Location within the United States

Location
- Country: United States
- State: Delaware
- County: Sussex

Physical characteristics
- Source: confluence of Stoney Branch and Asketum Branch
  - location: about 0.5 miles north of Hardscrabble
  - coordinates: 38°37′24″N 075°28′41″W
  - elevation: 28 ft (8.5 m)
- Mouth: Deep Creek
  - location: about 0.5 miles south-southwest of Old Furnace
  - coordinates: 38°39′15″N 075°31′28″W
  - elevation: 10 ft (3.0 m)
- Length: 3.58 mi (5.76 km)
- Basin size: 16.81 square miles (43.5 km^{2})
- Discharge
  - average: 20.53 cu ft/s (0.581 m^{3}/s) at mouth with Deep Creek

Basin features
- Progression: Deep Creek →Nanticoke River → Chesapeake Bay → Atlantic Ocean
- River system: Nanticoke River
- Tributaries
  - left: Asketum Branch
  - right: Stoney Branch
- Waterbodies: Fleetwood Pond
- Bridges: US 9 Baker Mill Road; Fleetwood Pond Road

Tyndall Branch is a 3.58-mile-long (5.76 km) third-order tributary to Deep Creek, in Sussex County, Delaware.

== Variant names ==
According to the Geographic Names Information System, it has also been known historically as Stoney Branch.

== Course ==
Tyndall Branch is formed at the confluence of Stoney Branch and Asketum Branch about 0.5 miles north of Hardscrabble in Sussex County, Delaware. Tyndall Branch then flows south-southwest to meet Deep Creek about 0.5 miles south-southwest of Old Furnace.

== Watershed ==
Tyndall Branch drains 16.81 square miles (43.5 km^{2}) of area, receives about 45.1 in/year of precipitation, has a topographic wetness index of 690.47 and is about 14.38% forested.

== See also ==
- List of rivers of Delaware
