= Jon Allen (musician) =

English singer-songwriter

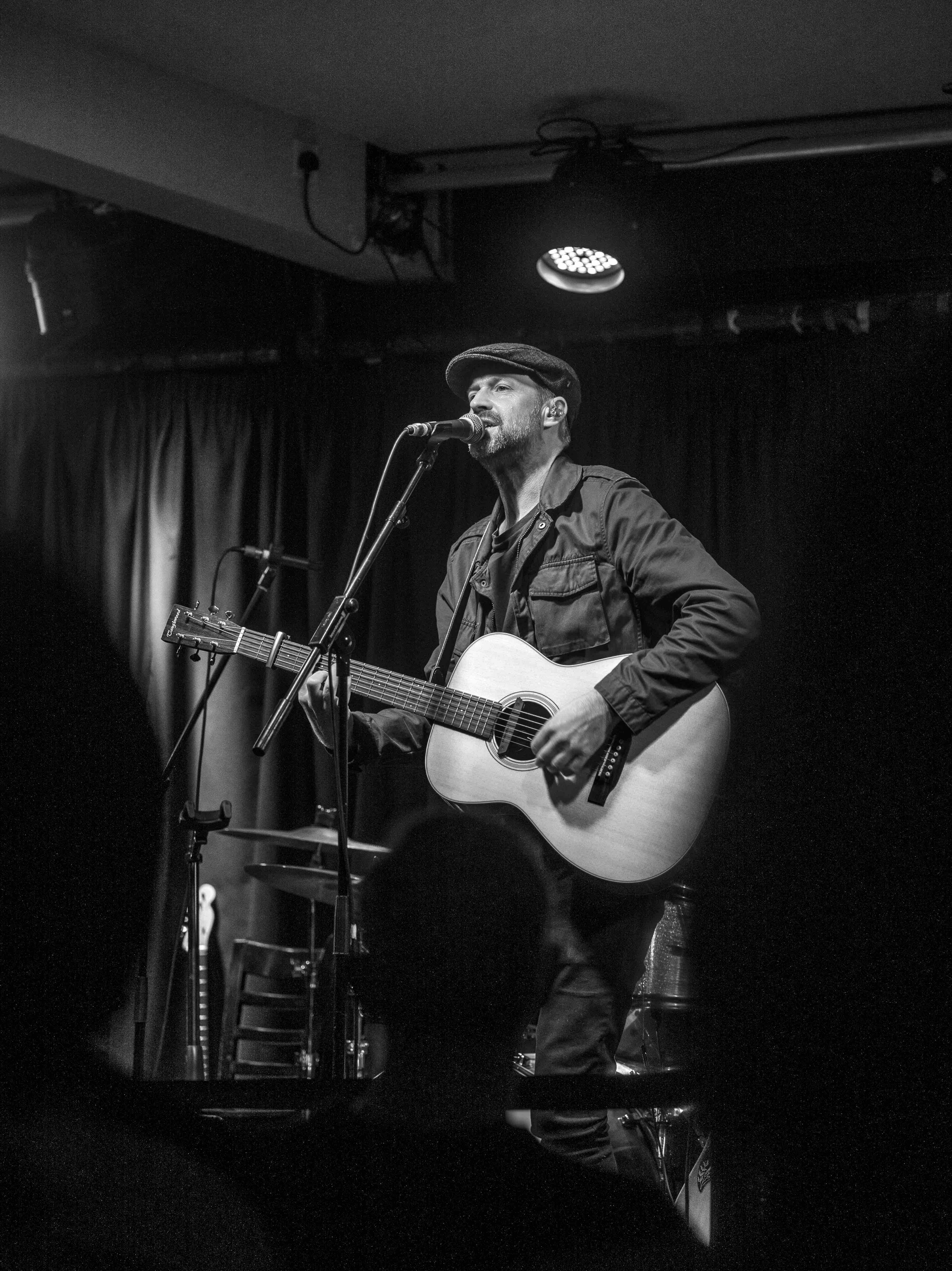
- Jon Allen live in concert

Background information
- Born: Jonathon Allen
- Origin: Winchester, England
- Genres: Classic rock; Soul; Blues
- Occupation: Singer-songwriter
- Instruments: Vocals; guitar; harmonica; piano; drums; bass
- Years active: 2008–present
- Labels: Monologue; Warner Chappell; Absolute; V2
- Website: jonallenmusic.com

Jon Allen, is an English singer-songwriter known for his distinctive whisky-soaked voice and compelling songwriting. He has firmly established himself on the music scene with a career spanning multiple albums and extensive touring.

== Early life ==
Born in Winchester and raised in South Devon, Allen began making music as a teenager. He attended the Liverpool Institute for Performing Arts (LIPA).

== Career ==
Allen's career took off with the release of his album Dead Man’s Suit. This pivotal project led to an appearance on BBC's Jools Holland early in his career, which opened doors for sync opportunities with TV, ad campaigns, films, and radio.

Allen's music is influenced by Free, The Faces, and the songwriting of Van Morrison and Elton John. While he has a profound love for American music, his sensibilities have crafted a distinctly British sound.

With a music catalogue spanning six albums, Allen's work streams worldwide across all platforms, and he has amassed over 30 million streams on Spotify. In 2025 he signed with Publisher Warner Chappell. He actively tours with his band, The Luna Kings, and is currently working on his eighth album.

=== Debut album ===
The song "Going Home" featured on the worldwide Land Rover TV commercial in 2008 bringing him wider recognition. In 2009, Allen signed with Absolute Distribution and released his debut album Dead Man's Suit. Shortly after this Allen signed a publishing deal with Wardlaw Music.

=== Side projects ===
As a founder member of northern soul production team, The Third Degree, he co-produced and sung one of the most widely recognised cover versions of the Duffy song Mercy.

== TV appearances and radio broadcasts ==
- Appearance on The Quay Sessions BBC Scotland
- Appearance on Vintage TV Live Sessions
- Appearance on The Late Late Show on RTÉ
- Appearance on Later... with Jools Holland
- Performed live to close Glastonbury Festival

== TV and film syncs ==
- Loving Arms appeared in the film What They Had starring Hilary Swank
- In Your Light appeared in the South Korean TV drama series Live OST (2018)
- Get What's Mine appeared in the 2016 comedy drama film Army of One starring Nicolas Cage
- Joanna appeared in the 2013 romantic drama thriller Safe Haven and the Showtime drama series Homeland
- Sweet Defeat and Joanna appeared in the 2013 Fox sit-com The Goodwin Games
- Sweet Defeat appeared in the 2011 comedy drama The Oranges
- When The Morning Comes featuring Amy Smith appeared in the drama series Bones

== Discography ==
=== Studio albums ===
- Dead Man's Suit (2009)
- Sweet Defeat (2011)
- Deep River (2014)
- Blue Flame (2018)
- ...meanwhile (2021)
- A Heightened Sense of Everything (2023)
- Seven Dials (2025)
- The Wolves Are Running (2026)

Year	Album	UK	NLD	UK Independent Albums Chart	UK Independent Album Breakers	UK Downloads
2009	Dead Man's Suit	139	28	–	16	–
2011	Sweet Defeat	196	55	27	8	–
2014	Deep River	126	88	16	2	–
2018	Blue Flame	–	161	25	5	87
2021	...meanwhile	–	–	50	8	–
2023	A Heightened Sense of Everything	–	–	–	–	–
2025	Seven Dials	–	–	–	–	–
2026	The Wolves Are Running	–	–	–	–	–

=== Singles ===
Year	Title	UK	NLD	UK Indie Chart	UK Indie Breakers	NLD (iTunes)	GRE (iTunes)	TUR (iTunes)	DIM (iTunes)
2008	"Going Home"								
2009	"In Your Light"	119	76			91			
2009	"Young Man Blues / Dead Man's Suit								
2009	"Down by the River"								
2010	"When The Morning Comes/Sarah"			40	7				
2011	"Sweet Defeat"					89			
2011	"Joanna"					67			
2012	"No One Gets Out of Here Alive"							97	
2014	"Night & Day"			16	3				
2018	"Blue Flame"					92			
2020	"Can't Hold Back the Sun"						16		
2020	"Keep On Walking"								80
2020	"How Long"								60
2022	"Can't Stop Now"					98			
2023	"Back to the River"					40			
