= Diep River (disambiguation) =

Diep River is a river in the Western Cape, a province of South Africa.

Diep River may also refer to:

- Diep River (Limpopo)
- Diep River, Cape Town

== See also ==
- Diep River Fynbos Corridor
- Deep River (disambiguation)
