= Sweet Defeat =

Studio album by Jon Allen
- Released: 31 May 2011
- Genre: Alternative/folk
- Length: 40:00
- Label: Monologue Records
- Producer: Tristan Longworth

Jon Allen chronology
Dead Man's Suit (2009)	Sweet Defeat (2011)	Deep River (2014)

Professional ratings
Review scores
Source	Rating
AllMusic	3/5 stars
Mojo	3/5 stars
Q	4/5 stars
Uncut	3/5 stars

Sweet Defeat is the second studio album by British singer/songwriter and musician Jon Allen, released on 31 May 2011 on the label Monologue Records in the UK.

== Track listing ==
No.	Title	Writer(s)	Length
1.	"Joanna"	Jon Allen	4:03
2.	"Stealing Away"	Jon Allen	2:44
3.	"Time to Cry"	Jon Allen	3:14
4.	"Broken Town"	Jon Allen	4:25
5.	"Lucky I Guess"	Jon Allen	3:28
6.	"Think of You"	Jon Allen	3:32
7.	"Sweet Defeat"	Jon Allen	3:47
8.	"Love's Made a Fool Out of Me"	Jon Allen	3:08
9.	"Here Tonight"	Jon Allen	3:59
10.	"No One Gets Out of Here Alive"	Jon Allen	4:45
11.	"Last Orders"	Jon Allen	3:30

== Charts ==
Chart (2011)	Peak position
Dutch Albums (Album Top 100)	55
UK Independent Albums (OCC)	27
