= Lake George (Hobart, Indiana) =

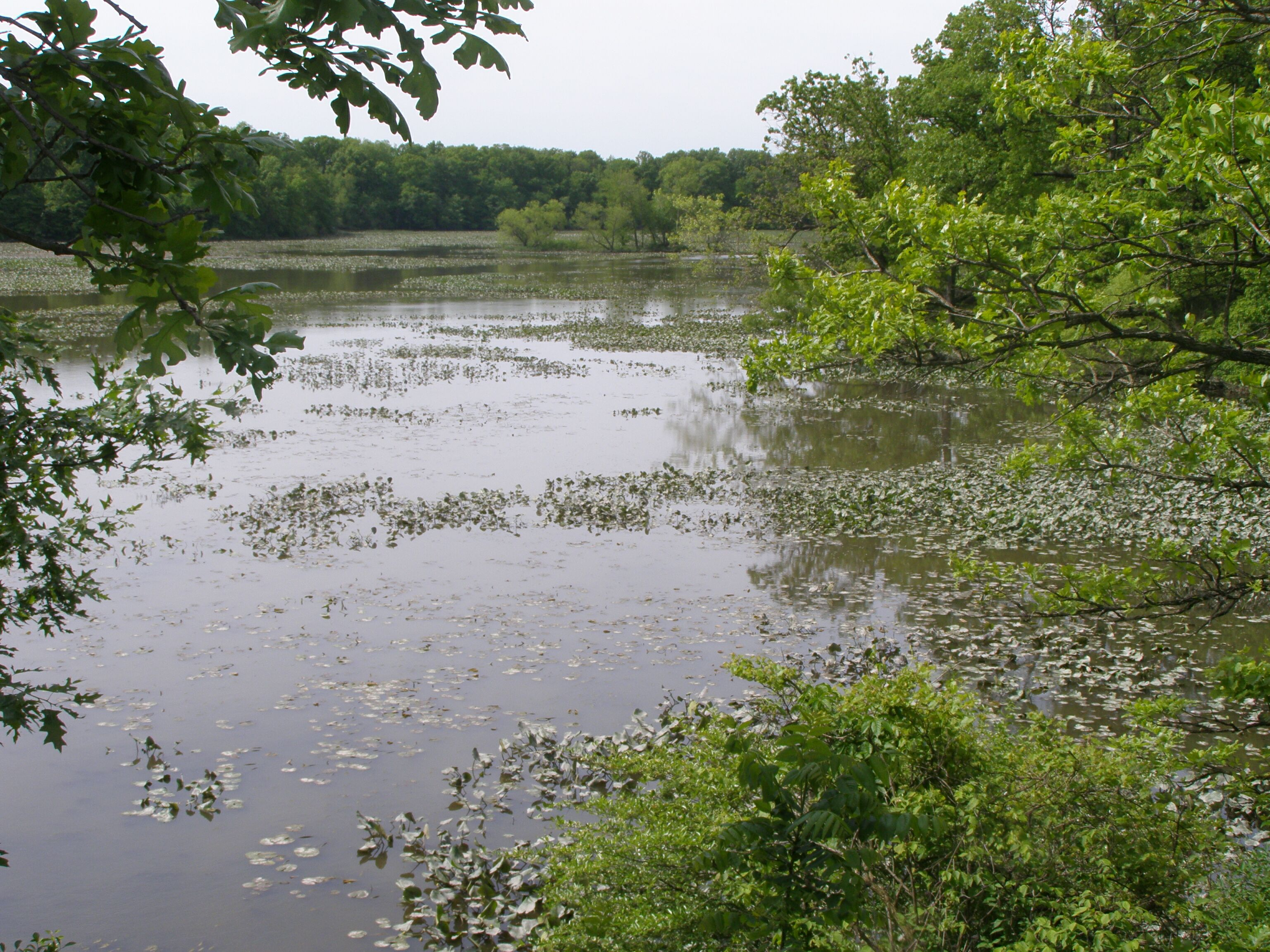
- Lake George, Indiana

- Location within Indiana Location within the United States
- Location: Hobart, Lake County, Indiana
- Coordinates: 41°31′41″N 87°16′26″W
- Basin countries: United States
- Managing agency: Hobart Parks and Recreation Department
- Surface area: 270 acres (110 ha)
- Max. depth: 14 ft (4.3 m)
- Surface elevation: 604 ft (184 m)

Lake George is a mill pond on Deep River in Hobart, Indiana, in the United States.

Lake George was formed when George Earle constructed a dam on Deep River to power sawmills and gristmills. The lake is fed by several small streams, including Deep River, the largest, and Turkey Creek. It is approximately 3.1 mi (5 km) long, 980 ft (300 m) at its widest, and has a surface area of 270 acres (110 ha).

The lake is a popular site for recreation in Hobart. Two local parks and multiple residential areas border the lake and Deep River.

Since its creation, the lake has accumulated a large amount of sediment in its upstream wetland areas that washes into the lake during rainfall events, leading to a decrease in water quality. In 1995, the U.S. Geological Survey carried out a survey of the lake to measure the thickness of sediment. As a result of this survey, the lake was dredged in 2000, removing nearly 600,000 cubic yards of sediment.
