= Cedar Swamp Wildlife Area =

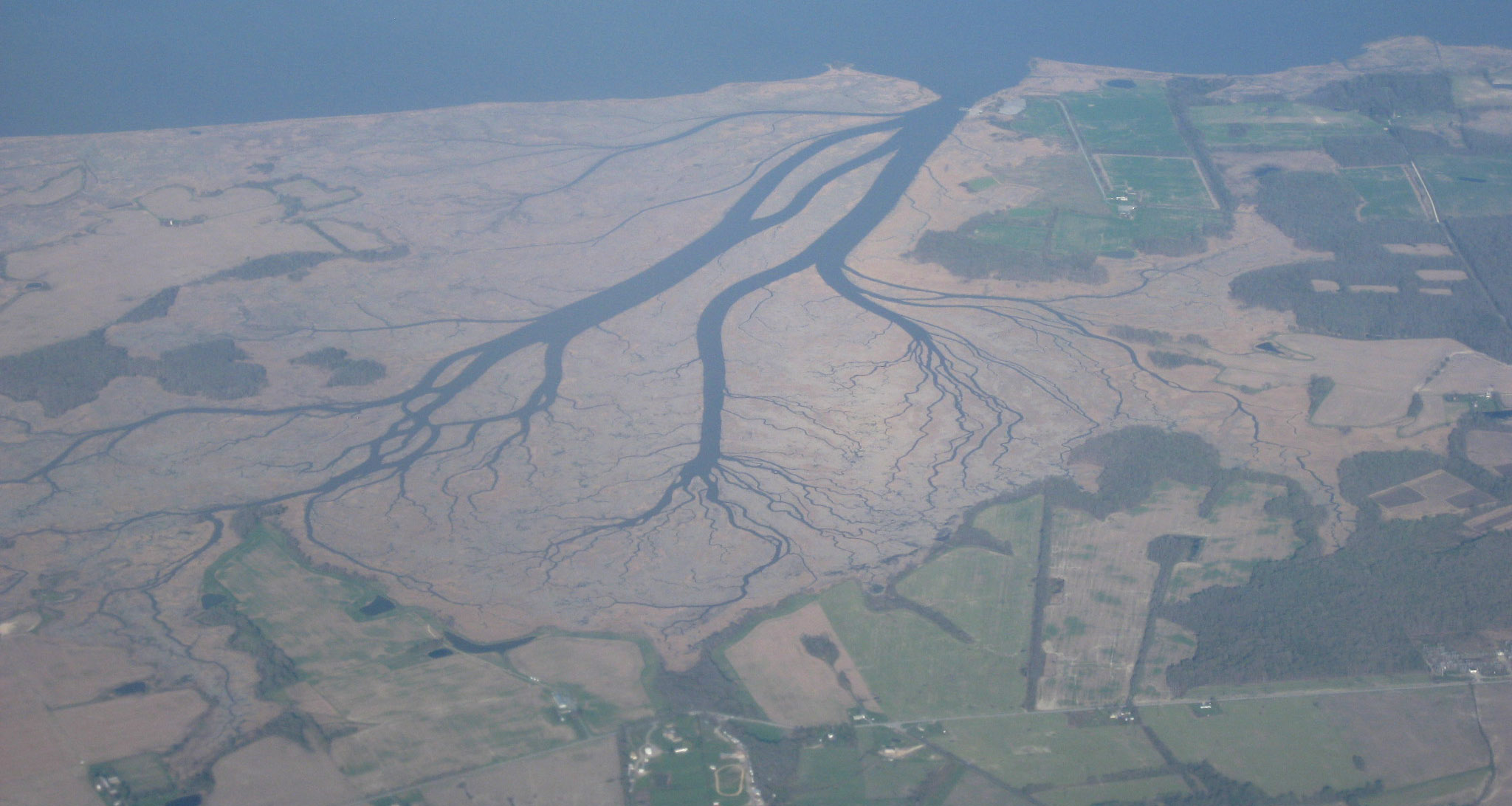
Oblique air photo of Cedar Swamp Wildlife Area, April 2010, facing west

Cedar Swamp Wildlife Area is a state wildlife area located in New Castle County, Delaware, along shore of the Delaware Bay. It is 5,515 acres (2,232 ha) in size and is managed by Delaware Department of Natural Resources and Environmental Control (DNREC), Division of Fish & Wildlife.

Much of the area is a transgressive brackish marsh. It is part of the Northeastern coastal forests ecoregion.

39°23′30″N 75°33′00″W
