= New Chicago, Indiana =

- Town
- Seal

- Location of New Chicago in Lake County, Indiana.
- Coordinates: 41°33′31″N 87°16′18″W
- Country: United States
- State: Indiana
- County: Lake
- Township: Hobart
- Plated: 1893

Area
  - Total: 0.68 sq mi (1.75 km^{2})
  - Land: 0.68 sq mi (1.75 km^{2})
  - Water: 0 sq mi (0.00 km^{2})
- Elevation: 637 ft (194 m)

Population (2020)
  - Total: 1,999
  - Density: 2,960.1/sq mi (1,142.91/km^{2})
- Time zone: UTC-6 (Central (CST))
  - Summer (DST): UTC-5 (CDT)
- ZIP code: 46342
- Area code: 219
- FIPS code: 18-52776
- GNIS feature ID: 2396801
- Website: newchicagoin.gov

New Chicago is a town in Hobart Township, Lake County, Indiana, United States. The population was 1,999 at the 2020 census.

== History ==
New Chicago was platted in 1893. A post office was opened at New Chicago in 1907, and remained in operation until it was discontinued in 1917.

== Geography ==
According to the 2010 census, New Chicago has a total area of 0.67 square miles (1.74 km^{2}), all land.

== Demographics ==
Historical population
Census	Pop.	Note	%±
1910	105		—
1920	300		185.7%
1930	481		60.3%
1940	466		−3.1%
1950	921		97.6%
1960	2,312		151.0%
1970	2,231		−3.5%
1980	2,581		15.7%
1990	2,066		−20.0%
2000	2,063		−0.1%
2010	2,035		−1.4%
2020	1,999		−1.8%
Source: US Census Bureau

=== Racial and ethnic composition ===
New Chicago town, Indiana – Racial and ethnic composition Note: the US Census treats Hispanic/Latino as an ethnic category. This table excludes Latinos from the racial categories and assigns them to a separate category. Hispanics/Latinos may be of any race.
Race / Ethnicity (NH = Non-Hispanic)	Pop 2000	Pop 2010	Pop 2020	% 2000	% 2010	% 2020
White alone (NH)	1,670	1,382	1,167	80.95%	67.91%	58.38%
Black or African American alone (NH)	6	36	88	0.29%	1.77%	4.40%
Native American or Alaska Native alone (NH)	13	5	3	0.63%	0.25%	0.15%
Asian alone (NH)	5	15	17	0.24%	0.74%	0.85%
Native Hawaiian or Pacific Islander alone (NH)	0	0	1	0.00%	0.00%	0.05%
Other race alone (NH)	3	1	15	0.15%	0.05%	0.75%
Mixed race or Multiracial (NH)	21	38	93	1.02%	1.87%	4.65%
Hispanic or Latino (any race)	345	558	615	16.72%	27.42%	30.77%
Total	2,063	2,035	1,999	100.00%	100.00%	100.00%

=== 2020 census ===
As of the 2020 census, New Chicago had a population of 1,999. The median age was 35.8 years. 24.3% of residents were under the age of 18 and 13.8% were 65 years of age or older. For every 100 females, there were 100.5 males, and for every 100 females age 18 and over, there were 95.7 males.

100.0% of residents lived in urban areas, while 0.0% lived in rural areas.

There were 812 households, of which 36.5% had children under the age of 18 living in them. Of all households, 31.7% were married-couple households, 25.2% were households with a male householder and no spouse or partner present, and 29.8% were households with a female householder and no spouse or partner present. About 29.8% of all households were made up of individuals, and 11.5% had someone living alone who was 65 years of age or older.

There were 879 housing units, of which 7.6% were vacant. The homeowner vacancy rate was 2.6% and the rental vacancy rate was 8.1%.

=== 2010 census ===
As of the census of 2010, there were 2,035 people, 763 households, and 487 families living in the town. The population density was 3,037.3 inhabitants per square mile (1,172.7/km^{2}). There were 866 housing units at an average density of 1,292.5 per square mile (499.0/km^{2}). The racial makeup of the town was 81.0% White, 2.2% African American, 0.7% Native American, 0.7% Asian, 10.0% from other races, and 5.3% from two or more races. Hispanic or Latino of any race were 27.4% of the population.

There were 763 households, of which 35.1% had children under the age of 18 living with them, 38.7% were married couples living together, 17.3% had a female householder with no husband present, 7.9% had a male householder with no wife present, and 36.2% were non-families. 29.0% of all households were made up of individuals, and 8.9% had someone living alone who was 65 years of age or older. The average household size was 2.67 and the average family size was 3.29.

The median age in the town was 33.9 years. 27.5% of residents were under the age of 18; 8.1% were between the ages of 18 and 24; 29% were from 25 to 44; 24.4% were from 45 to 64; and 11.1% were 65 years of age or older. The gender makeup of the town was 50.0% male and 50.0% female.

=== 2000 census ===
As of the census of 2000, there were 2,063 people, 826 households, and 532 families living in the town. The population density was 3,071.3 inhabitants per square mile (1,185.8/km^{2}). There were 876 housing units at an average density of 1,304.2 per square mile (503.6/km^{2}). The racial makeup of the town was 87.64% White, 0.53% African American, 0.73% Native American, 0.24% Asian, 8.92% from other races, and 1.94% from two or more races. Hispanic or Latino of any race were 16.72% of the population.

There were 826 households, out of which 31.2% had children under the age of 18 living with them, 43.7% were married couples living together, 13.2% had a female householder with no husband present, and 35.5% were non-families. 29.8% of all households were made up of individuals, and 10.2% had someone living alone who was 65 years of age or older. The average household size was 2.50 and the average family size was 3.06.

In the town, the population was spread out, with 26.0% under the age of 18, 11.0% from 18 to 24, 30.0% from 25 to 44, 22.1% from 45 to 64, and 11.1% who were 65 years of age or older. The median age was 32 years. For every 100 females, there were 95.2 males. For every 100 females age 18 and over, there were 93.5 males.

The median income for a household in the town was $32,759, and the median income for a family was $36,852. Males had a median income of $36,400 versus $22,045 for females. The per capita income for the town was $16,342. About 10.6% of families and 14.2% of the population were below the poverty line, including 18.9% of those under age 18 and 6.8% of those age 65 or over.

== Education ==
Residents are zoned to River Forest Community School Corporation. The district's sole comprehensive high school is River Forest High School.

=== Public libraries ===
Lake County Public Library operates the Lake Station - New Chicago Branch at 2007 Central Avenue in nearby Lake Station.
