= River Forest High School =

Location
- 3300 Indiana Street; Lake Station (Hobart address), Indiana 46342; United States
- 41°33′31″N 87°16′45″W

Information
- Type: Public high school
- Established: 1958
- School district: River Forest Community School Corporation
- Superintendent: Steven Disney
- Principal: Ryan Pitcock
- Faculty: 30.50 (on an FTE basis)
- Grades: 6- 12
- Enrollment: 532 (2022-2023)
- Student to teacher ratio: 17.44
- Colors: Cardinal and gold
- Athletics conference: Greater South Shore
- Nickname: Ingots
- Newspaper: Ingot Informer
- Yearbook: River Forest High School Yearbook
- Website: www.rfcsc.k12.in.us/o/rfhs

River Forest High School is a secondary school located in Lake Station, Indiana, with a Hobart postal address, serving grades 6–12. It is the secondary school in the River Forest Community School Corporation, serving the entire town of New Chicago, portions of the cities of Gary, Hobart and Lake Station, and unincorporated areas in Hobart Township, Lake County. It opened in 1958. The Golden Ingot Marching Band can be viewed in the Saint Patrick's Day Parade in the film The Fugitive.

== Academics ==
River Forest's high school academic team consists of United States Academic Decathlon, Spell Bowl and Academic Super Bowl. River Forest participated in the Online Nationals for United States Academic Decathlon in 2016.

== Athletics ==
River Forest's athletic teams are known as the Ingots, harking back to the steel-making heritage of the area. They belong to the Duneland Athletic Conference and their colors are cardinal red and gold. River Forest offers the following sports:

- Baseball (boys)
- Basketball (boys & girls)
- Cross country (boys & girls)
- Football (boys) (1990 2A IHSAA state runners-up)
- Golf (boys)
- Soccer (boys and girls)
- Softball (girls)
- Tennis (boys & girls)
- Track (boys & girls)
- Volleyball (girls)
- Wrestling (boys)

== See also ==
- List of high schools in Indiana
