= Deep Lake (Colorado) =

Lake in Colorado, United States

- Location within Colorado Location within the United States
- Location: White River National Forest, Colorado
- Coordinates: 39°46′23″N 107°18′00″W
- Basin countries: United States
- Surface area: 33 acres (13 ha)
- Surface elevation: 3,190 m (10,470 ft)

Deep Lake is a 33-acre (130,000 m^{2}) lake in White River National Forest, in Colorado, United States. It is the site of Deep Lake Campground. Deep Creek flows through the lake.
