= Liverpool, Indiana =

Liverpool, Lake County, Indiana
- Unincorporated community
- Location within Indiana Location within the United States
- Coordinates: 41°33′09″N 87°17′41″W
- Country: United States
- State: Indiana
- County: Lake
- Township: Hobart
- Elevation: 637 ft (194 m)
- Time zone: UTC-6 (Central)
  - Summer (DST): UTC-5 (Central)
- ZIP code: 46405
- Area code: 219
- FIPS code: 18-44388
- GNIS feature ID: 438185

Liverpool was the original county seat of Lake County, Indiana, and one of the oldest towns in the area. Today, another settlement on the same site, named "Liverpool" after the former town, is a neighborhood of Lake Station, Indiana.

== History ==
At the start of 1836, the land that Liverpool would occupy was still owned by Potawatomi Amerinds. However, under the Treaty of Tippecanoe, some of the Potawatomi were given certificates that allowed them to claim parcels of land. John Chapman bought one of these certificates, giving him ownership of section 24 of township 36 north of range 8 west. At the time, Chicago was a small but rapidly growing harbor town, and Chapman intended to make a city large enough to rival it. It joined the other four cities then competing to be the metropolis of Lake Michigan: Chicago, Michigan City, City West, and Indiana City. Chapman platted Liverpool near the confluence of the Little Calumet River and Deep River, both of which were navigable at the time. An article from 1929 describes the original plan for the town, enumerating central streets and blocks:

"Of the streets thereon they had their Broadway, their Market Street, their Chestnut Street, Michigan, Indiana, and others of like dignity and rank, some of which were 100 feet in width. One block was designated "Public Square;" another "Market Square;" another "Church Square." Then there were 40 blocks subdivided into lots, 435 in number. Through this city to be, flowed the waters of Deep River, then described upon the plat as being 14 feet in depth, there being 18 blocks north of the river and 23 south."

The town competed with the settlements of Lake Court House and Cedar Lake for the position of county seat in 1839. A wealthy land speculator named George Earle, who had acquired much of the surrounding territory, campaigned in support of Liverpool, and a commission decided in Liverpool's favor, making it the seat of Lake County. However, in 1840 citizens in the west of the county complained to the state legislature that the county seat was too far east, and another commission moved the county seat to Lake Court House, which later became Crown Point, Indiana.

Combined with the financial problems of the Panic of 1837, this resulted in the end of Liverpool's brief period of significance. The Liverpool courthouse was sold and floated downriver to Blue Island, Illinois. George Earle moved away and founded Hobart, Indiana. At its height, there were about 500 settlers living in Liverpool; by the late 1840s, there were only two families left. Finally, a fire swept through the almost-empty town, and nothing was left of its original forty blocks of buildings.

Today, a neighborhood of Lake Station, Indiana, which is at approximately the same location as the old city of Liverpool is sometimes referred to as "Liverpool."
