= Dead Man's Suit =

Studio album by Jon Allen
- Released: 1 June 2009
- Genre: Alternative folk
- Length: 46:00
- Label: Monologue Records
- Producer: Tristan Longworth

Jon Allen chronology
Dead Man's Suit (2009)	Sweet Defeat (2011)

Professional ratings
Review scores
Source	Rating
Daily Music Guide	4.5/5 stars
Jools Holland	(very favourable)
Maverick	4/5 stars
Mojo	3/5 stars
MusicOMH	3/5 stars
Q	4/5 stars
Uncut	3/5 stars

Dead Man's Suit is the debut studio album by British singer-songwriter and musician Jon Allen, released on 01 June 2009 on Monologue Records in the UK.

== Track listing ==
No.	Title	Writer(s)	Length
1.	"Dead Man's Suit"	Jon Allen	3:51
2.	"In Your Light"	Jon Allen	4:06
3.	"Going Home"	Jon Allen/Tristan Longworth	3:15
4.	"Down by the River"	Jon Allen	4:21
5.	"Sleeping Soul"	Jon Allen	4:17
6.	"Happy Now"	Jon Allen	4:30
7.	"Take Me to Heart"	Jon Allen	4:08
8.	"Lay Your Burden Down"	Jon Allen	3:58
9.	"Young Mans Blues"	Jon Allen	3:21
10.	"New Years Eve"	Jon Allen	3:38
11.	"Bad Penny"	Jon Allen	4:22
12.	"Friends"	Jon Allen	2:17
