= Stoney Branch (Tyndall Branch tributary) =

Stoney Branch Tributary to Tyndall Branch
- Location within Delaware Location within the United States

Location
- Country: United States
- State: Delaware
- County: Sussex

Physical characteristics
- Source: Sheep Pen Ditch divide
  - location: about 1 mile southeast of Whaleys Crossroads
  - coordinates: 38°38′21″N 075°28′11″W
  - elevation: 55 ft (17 m)
- Mouth: Tyndall Branch
  - location: about 0.5 miles north of Hardscrabble
  - coordinates: 38°37′24″N 075°28′41″W
  - elevation: 30 ft (9.1 m)
- Length: 4.30 mi (6.92 km)
- Basin size: 7.85 square miles (20.3 km^{2})
- Discharge
  - average: 9.63 cu ft/s (0.273 m^{3}/s) at mouth with Tyndall Branch

Basin features
- Progression: northwest
- River system: Nanticoke River
- Tributaries
  - left: Big Mill Branch
  - right: unnamed tributaries
- Bridges: US 9 Asbury Road

Stoney Branch is a 4.30 mi (6.92 km) long 3rd order tributary to Tyndall Branch, in Sussex County, Delaware.

== Variant names ==
According to the Geographic Names Information System, it has also been known historically as:

- Tyndall Branch

== Course ==
Stoney Branch rises on the Sheep Pen Ditch divide about 1 mile southeast of Whaleys Crossroads in Sussex County, Delaware. Stoney Branch then flows southwest to meet Tyndall Branch about 0.5 miles north of Hardscrabble.

== Watershed ==
Stoney Branch drains 7.85 square miles (20.3 km^{2}) of area, receives about 45.1 in/year of precipitation, has a topographic wetness index of 722.14 and is about 14.03% forested.

== See also ==
- List of rivers of Delaware
