= McColleys Branch =

Stream in Delaware, USA

McColleys Branch Tributary to Deep Creek
- Location of McColleys Branch mouth McColleys Branch (the United States)

Location
- Country: United States
- State: Delaware
- County: Sussex

Physical characteristics
- Source: Horse Pound Swamp Ditch divide
  - location: about 0.5 miles southwest of Bull Pine Corners, Delaware
  - coordinates: 38°41′00″N 075°25′58″W
  - elevation: 45 ft (14 m)
- Mouth: Deep Creek
  - location: about 3 miles southeast of Coverdale Crossroads, Delaware
  - coordinates: 38°41′07″N 075°28′48″W
  - elevation: 23 ft (7.0 m)
- Length: 4.28 mi (6.89 km)
- Basin size: 11.84 square miles (30.7 km^{2})
- Discharge
  - location: Deep Creek
  - average: 14.54 cu ft/s (0.412 m^{3}/s) at mouth with Deep Creek

Basin features
- Progression: Deep Creek → Nanticoke River → Chesapeake Bay → Atlantic Ocean
- River system: Nanticoke River
- Tributaries
  - left: Raccoon Ditch
  - right: New Ditch; Layton-Vaugh Ditch
- Bridges: E Trap Pond Road, US 9, Warrington Road, Asbury Road, Raccoon Ditch Road, Rum Bridge Road

McColleys Branch is a 4.28 mi (6.89 km) long 2nd order tributary to Deep Creek in Sussex County, Delaware. This is the only stream of this name in the United States.

== Variant names ==
According to the Geographic Names Information System, it has also been known historically as:

- McColley Branch
- New Ditch

== Course ==
McColleys Branch rises on the Horse Pound Swamp Ditch divide about 0.5 miles southwest of Bull Pine Corners, Delaware, and then flows northwesterly to join Deep Creek about 3 miles southeast of Coverdale Crossroads.

== Watershed ==
McColleys Branch drains 11.84 square miles (30.7 km^{2}) of area, receives about 45.2 in/year of precipitation, has a wetness index of 708.10, and is about 22% forested.

== See also ==
- List of rivers of Delaware
