= Asketum Branch (Tyndall Branch tributary) =

Asketum Branch Tributary to Tyndall Branch
- Location within Delaware Location within the United States

Location
- Country: United States
- State: Delaware
- County: Sussex

Physical characteristics
- Source: Shoal Branch divide
  - location: about 0.25 miles southeast of Jones Crossroads
  - coordinates: 38°36′01″N 075°26′10″W
  - elevation: 54 ft (16 m)
- Mouth: Tyndall Branch
  - location: about 0.5 miles north of Hardscrabble
  - coordinates: 38°37′24″N 075°28′41″W
  - elevation: 30 ft (9.1 m)
- Length: 2.23 mi (3.59 km)
- Basin size: 3.13 square miles (8.1 km^{2})
- Discharge
  - average: 2.75 cu ft/s (0.078 m^{3}/s) at mouth with Tyndall Branch

Basin features
- Progression: northwest
- River system: Nanticoke River
- Tributaries
  - left: unnamed tributaries
  - right: unnamed tributaries
- Bridges: Hardscrabble Road; E Trap Pond Road; James Road; Hardscrabble Road; Beaver Dam Branch

Asketum Branch is a 2.23 mi (3.59 km) long 1st order tributary to Tyndall Branch, in Sussex County, Delaware.

== Course ==
Asketum Branch rises on the Shoal Branch divide about 0.25 miles southeast of Jones Crossroads in Sussex County, Delaware. Asketum Branch then flows northwest to meet Tyndall Branch about 0.5 miles north of Hardscrabble.

== Watershed ==
Asketum Branch drains 3.13 square miles (8.1 km^{2}) of area, receives about 45.1 in/year of precipitation, has a topographic wetness index of 665.35 and is about 10.35% forested.

== See also ==
- List of rivers of Delaware
