= Marshy Hope Wildlife Area =

State wildlife area in Delaware, U.S.

Coordinates: 38°45′N 75°42′W

Marshy Hope Wildlife Area is a state wildlife area located in Sussex County, Delaware, near the town of Bridgeville, Delaware, and along the Maryland and Delaware border and along the Delaware side of the Marshyhope Creek. It is made up of three land tracts totaling 1,079 acres (437 ha). It is managed by Delaware Department of Natural Resources and Environmental Control (DNREC), Department of Fish and Wildlife.
