= Thomas A. Edison Junior-Senior High School =

Location
- 3304 Parkside Avenue; Lake Station, Indiana 46405; United States; 41°34′38″N 87°14′40″W

Information
- Type: Public
- Established: 1932
- School district: Lake Station Community School Corporation
- Superintendent: Thomas Cripliver
- Principal: Christine Pepa
- Teaching staff: 35.33 (FTE)
- Grades: 6-12
- Enrollment: 614 (2023-2024)
- Student to teacher ratio: 17.38
- Color
- Athletics conference: Greater South Shore
- Team name: Fighting Eagles
- Newspaper: Eagle Feathers
- Yearbook: Edisonian
- Website: eh.lakes.k12.in.us

Thomas A. Edison Junior-Senior High School is a seven-year (6–12) public junior and senior high school of the Lake Station Community Schools in Lake Station, Indiana. The school serves most of Lake Station.

== Demographics ==
The demographic breakdown of the 622 students enrolled in the 2014-2015 school district was:

- Male - 52.3%
- Female - 47.7%
- Native American/Alaskan - 0.5%
- Asian/Pacific islander - 0.3%
- Black - 5.3%
- Hispanic - 38.1%
- White - 52.7%
- Multiracial - 3.1%

71.2% of the students were eligible for free or reduced lunch.

== Athletics ==
Edison is home to the "Fighting Eagles". The following high school sports are offered at Edison:

- Baseball (boys)
- Basketball (girls and boys)
- Cheerleading (girls)
- Cross country (co-ed)
- Football (boys)
- Softball (girls)
- Tennis (girls and boys)
- Track (girls and boys)
- Volleyball (girls)
- Wrestling (boys)

== See also ==
- List of high schools in Indiana
