= Lake Station, Indiana =

- City
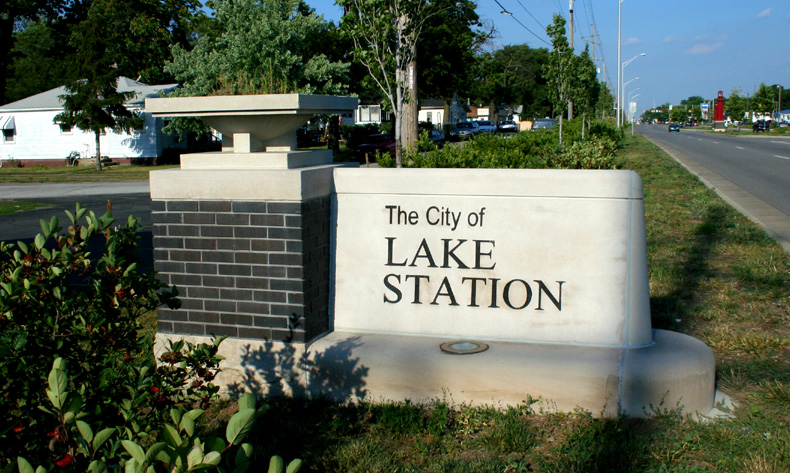

- Seal
- Motto: "Our Home Town"
- Location of Lake Station in Lake County, Indiana.
- Coordinates: 41°34′26″N 87°15′05″W
- Country: United States
- State: Indiana
- County: Lake
- Townships: Hobart, Calumet

Government
  - Mayor: Bill Carroll (D)

Area
  - Total: 8.42 sq mi (21.82 km^{2})
  - Land: 8.29 sq mi (21.47 km^{2})
  - Water: 0.14 sq mi (0.35 km^{2})
- Elevation: 594 ft (181 m)

Population (2020)
  - Total: 13,235
  - Density: 1,596.6/sq mi (616.44/km^{2})
- Time zone: UTC-6 (CST)
  - Summer (DST): UTC-5 (CDT)
- ZIP code: 46405
- Area code: 219
- FIPS code: 18-41535
- GNIS feature ID: 2395602
- Website: www.lakestation-in.gov

Lake Station is a city in Lake County, Indiana, United States. The population was 13,235 at the 2020 census.

== History ==
Initially, the site of modern Lake Station was the starting point of two indigenous trails leading to Fort Dearborn. Later it became an early stagecoach depot stop, as the Fort Dearborn-Detroit Stagecoach Route passed through the site during the wet season. The location became known as Lake Station as far back as 1851 when it began to serve as a depot, the western terminus of the Michigan Central Railroad (on what would later become its Detroit to Chicago line). This was the first train station in Lake County. The Michigan Central Railroad built a park and railroad shops around its two-story depot. A year later, in April 1852, George Earle mapped out and platted a town of about 6,500 acres (26 km^{2}) on the site, continuing its name of Lake Station.

Being a bedroom community, Lake Station welcomed Abraham Lincoln to its Audubon Hotel, perhaps on more than one occasion, according to oral history. But George Pullman, who tried to negotiate for land in Lake Station for his proposed railcar company, never struck a deal and set up shop on the south side of Chicago instead. Prior to its current location in Crown Point, Indiana, the county seat was located on what is now the west end of Lake Station in a section called Liverpool, although it was a separate settlement at the time.

The name of Lake Station was officially changed to East Gary in 1908 in an attempt to lure executives from the nearby US Steel plant in Gary, Indiana into creating a suburban community. It returned to its historical name of Lake Station in 1977 to disassociate itself from Gary's decline.

In September 2015, the mayor of Lake Station, Keith Soderquist, and his wife, Deborah Soderquist, were found guilty of conspiracy, wire fraud, and filing false income tax returns. Keith's daughter, Miranda N. Brakley (married name Barnitt), a court clerk, was found guilty of embezzlement and filing bad bankruptcy papers. Under state law, a mayor convicted of a felony forfeits his elected office. The Soderquist's served time in correctional institutions, while Ms. Brakley (Barnitt) served time in house arrest. The Soderquist's and Barnitt are still residents of Lake Station, Indiana.

== Geography ==
According to the 2010 census, Lake Station has a total area of 8.431 square miles (21.84 km^{2}), of which 8.3 square miles (21.50 km^{2}) (or 98.45%) is land and 0.131 square miles (0.34 km^{2}) (or 1.55%) is water.

The city lies on the Calumet Shoreline, which is seen today as a sand ridge.

=== Major highways ===
- Interstate 65
- Interstate 80
- Interstate 90
- Interstate 94
- U.S. Route 6
- U.S. Route 20
- Indiana State Road 51

=== Lakes and rivers ===
- Grand Boulevard Lake
- Deep River (Indiana)

=== Surrounding cities ===
- Hobart
- Gary
- Portage
- Town of New Chicago

== Demographics ==
Historical population
Census	Pop.	Note	%±
1880	170		—
1910	484		—
1920	813		68.0%
1930	2,409		196.3%
1940	3,401		41.2%
1950	5,635		65.7%
1960	9,309		65.2%
1970	9,858		5.9%
1980	15,087		53.0%
1990	13,899		−7.9%
2000	13,948		0.4%
2010	12,572		−9.9%
2020	13,235		5.3%
Source: US Census Bureau

=== Racial and ethnic composition ===
Lake Station city, Indiana – Racial and ethnic composition Note: the US Census treats Hispanic/Latino as an ethnic category. This table excludes Latinos from the racial categories and assigns them to a separate category. Hispanics/Latinos may be of any race.
Race / Ethnicity (NH = Non-Hispanic)	Pop 2000	Pop 2010	Pop 2020	% 2000	% 2010	% 2020
White alone (NH)	10,695	8,385	7,613	76.68%	66.70%	57.52%
Black or African American alone (NH)	82	373	647	0.59%	2.97%	4.89%
Native American or Alaska Native alone (NH)	52	40	26	0.37%	0.32%	0.20%
Asian alone (NH)	38	35	35	0.27%	0.28%	0.26%
Native Hawaiian or Pacific Islander alone (NH)	1	0	1	0.01%	0.00%	0.01%
Other race alone (NH)	2	7	62	0.01%	0.06%	0.47%
Mixed race or Multiracial (NH)	203	215	655	1.46%	1.71%	4.95%
Hispanic or Latino (any race)	2,875	3,517	4,196	20.61%	27.97%	31.70%
Total	13,948	12,572	13,235	100.00%	100.00%	100.00%

=== 2020 census ===
As of the 2020 census, Lake Station had a population of 13,235. The median age was 36.7 years. 25.0% of residents were under the age of 18 and 13.6% of residents were 65 years of age or older. For every 100 females, there were 103.7 males, and for every 100 females age 18 and over, there were 100.0 males age 18 and over.

100.0% of residents lived in urban areas, while 0.0% lived in rural areas.

There were 4,892 households in Lake Station, of which 33.1% had children under the age of 18 living in them. Of all households, 37.2% were married-couple households, 23.5% were households with a male householder and no spouse or partner present, and 28.4% were households with a female householder and no spouse or partner present. About 27.5% of all households were made up of individuals, and 10.1% had someone living alone who was 65 years of age or older.

There were 5,369 housing units, of which 8.9% were vacant. The homeowner vacancy rate was 1.9% and the rental vacancy rate was 7.2%.

=== 2010 census ===
As of the census of 2010, there were 12,572 people, 4,577 households, and 3,067 families residing in the city. The population density was 1,514.7 inhabitants per square mile (584.8/km^{2}). There were 5,137 housing units at an average density of 618.9 per square mile (239.0/km^{2}). The racial makeup of the city was 79.7% White, 3.6% African American, 0.5% Native American, 0.3% Asian, 11.7% from other races, and 4.1% from two or more races. Hispanic or Latino of any race were 28.0% of the population.

There were 4,577 households, of which 35.6% had children under the age of 18 living with them, 42.4% were married couples living together, 17.1% had a female householder with no husband present, 7.5% had a male householder with no wife present, and 33.0% were non-families. 26.5% of all households were made up of individuals, and 8.3% had someone living alone who was 65 years of age or older. The average household size was 2.72 and the average family size was 3.28.

The median age in the city was 35.4 years. 26.4% of residents were under the age of 18; 9% were between the ages of 18 and 24; 27.2% were from 25 to 44; 26.7% were from 45 to 64; and 10.7% were 65 years of age or older. The gender makeup of the city was 50.0% male and 50.0% female.

=== 2000 census ===
As of the census of 2000, there were 13,948 people, 5,041 households, and 3,528 families residing in the city. The population density was 1,681.0 inhabitants per square mile (649.0/km^{2}). There were 5,328 housing units at an average density of 642.1 per square mile (247.9/km^{2}). The racial makeup of the city was 86.23% White, 0.77% African American, 0.50% Native American, 0.30% Asian, 0.05% Pacific Islander, 9.31% from other races, and 2.85% from two or more races. Hispanic or Latino of any race were 20.61% of the population.

There were 5,041 households, out of which 33.8% had children under the age of 18 living with them, 48.9% were married couples living together, 14.5% had a female householder with no husband present, and 30.0% were non-families. 23.4% of all households were made up of individuals, and 8.4% had someone living alone who was 65 years of age or older. The average household size was 2.75 and the average family size was 3.24.

In the city, the population was spread out, with 27.1% under the age of 18, 10.5% from 18 to 24, 30.7% from 25 to 44, 21.0% from 45 to 64, and 10.6% who were 65 years of age or older. The median age was 33 years. For every 100 females, there were 99.6 males. For every 100 females age 18 and over, there were 98.4 males.

The median income for a household in the city was $36,984, and the median income for a family was $41,454. Males had a median income of $35,761 versus $22,659 for females. The per capita income for the city was $15,319. About 10.6% of families and 14.6% of the population were below the poverty line, including 21.3% of those under age 18 and 10.0% of those age 65 or over.

== Economy ==
Major employers include Sun Engineering, and Pro-Chem-Co. Lake Station's busiest rail line is CSX Transportation's Porter Subdivision. The Chicago, Fort Wayne and Eastern Railroad also runs through Lake Station.

The Joliet Line of the Michigan Central Railroad once ran through Lake Station; the Fairview Walkway, a rail trail, now occupies the abandoned rail line.

== Arts and culture ==
Lake Station also plays host to some events such as the Fuzz Follies, which is a car show that takes place in Riverview Park every year since 1984. Since 2004 The Heritage Days Festival has also taken place in Riverview Park. Both events are usually in June. The city's newest event held for the first time in September 2009 is Septemberfest, which is held around Labor Day weekend.

Lake County Public Library operates the Lake Station - New Chicago Branch, which also serves New Chicago.

== Parks and recreation ==
- Four Winds Park
- Columbus Park
- Riverview Park
- Miller Park
- Mock Park
- Deep River Outdoor Recreation Center
- Johnson Park
- Bicentennial Park
- Warrick Park
- Riley Park

== Government ==
The mayor of Lake Station since January 1, 2020, is Bill Carroll.

== Education ==
Lake Station Community Schools serves most of Lake Station. Some portions are served by River Forest Community School Corporation.

The Lake Station Community Schools district consists of two elementary schools, Virgil I. Bailey and Alexander Hamilton, and one combined junior and senior high school Thomas A. Edison Junior-Senior High School.

The River Forest Community School Corporation serves the West End of Lake Station (approximately one-third of the city). River Forest High School, River Forest Junior High School, John I. Meister Elementary School, and Henry S. Evans Elementary School are all within the city limits of Lake Station (as the result of the city's 1972 annexation of previously unincorporated parts of Hobart Township).
