= Deep Creek Township =

Deep Creek Township may refer to the following townships in the United States:

- Deep Creek Township, Clinton County, Iowa
- Deep Creek Township, Yadkin County, North Carolina
