= Old Furnace Wildlife Area =

Coordinates: 38°39′N 75°28′W

Old Furnace Wildlife Area is a state wildlife area located in Sussex County, Delaware, just to the east of the town of Seaford, Delaware. It is made up of four land tracts totalling 2,237 acres (905 ha), it is managed by Delaware Department of Natural Resources and Environmental Control (DNREC), Division of Fish and Wildlife.
