= Redden Forest Education Center =

- Redden Forest Lodge, Forester's House, and Stable
- U.S. National Register of Historic Places
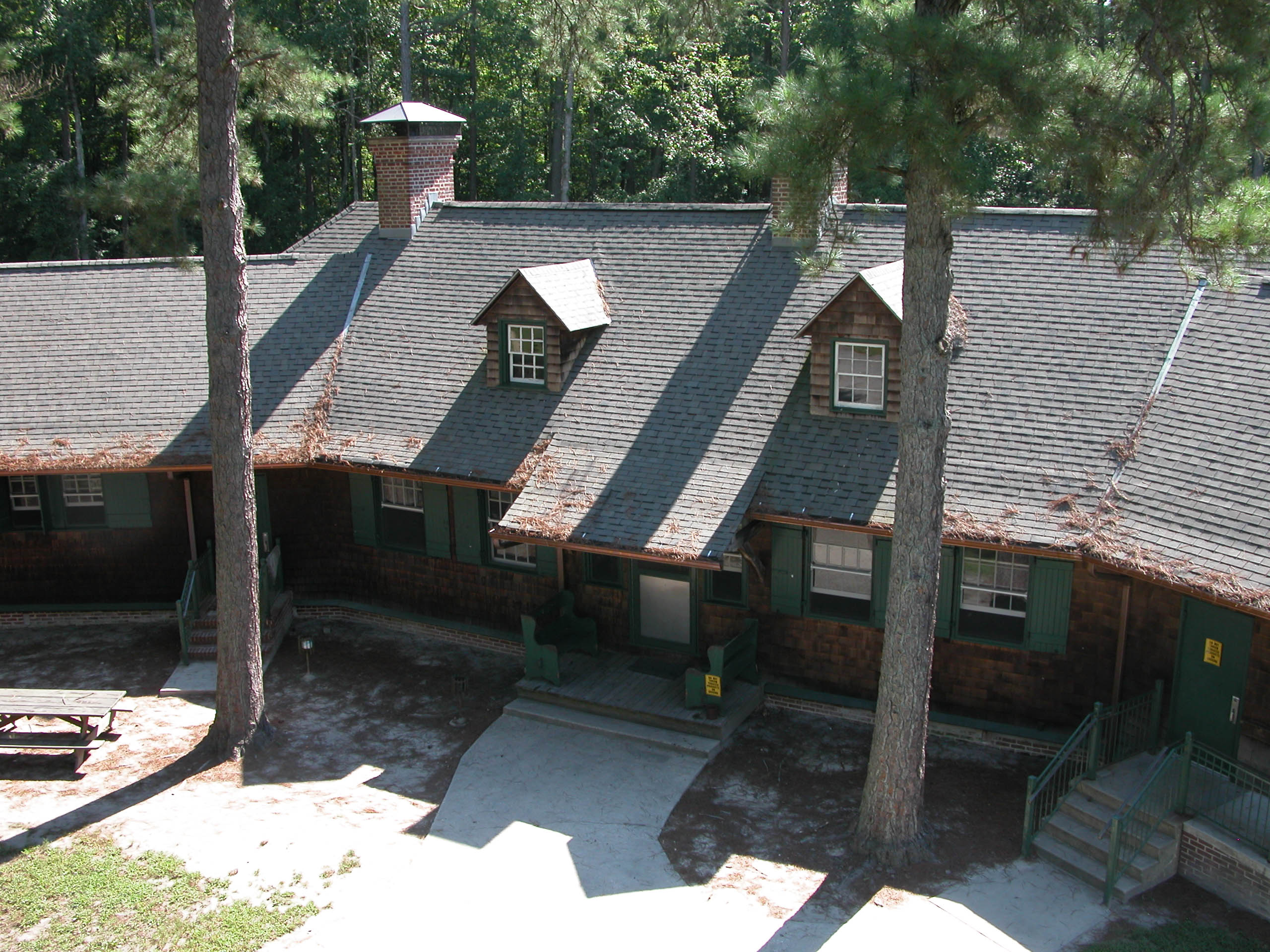
- Redden Lodge

- Location within Delaware Location within the United States
- Nearest city: Georgetown, Delaware
- Coordinates: 38°44′28″N 75°24′38″W
- Area: 110 acres (45 ha)
- Built: 1900
- Architect: Thomson, Frank, Graham
- Architectural style: Shingle Style
- NRHP reference No.: 80000940
- Added to NRHP: November 25, 1980

The Redden Forest Complex is located in Redden State Forest, Sussex County, Delaware. Now known as the Redden Forest Education Center, the complex includes three Shingle style buildings built in 1900–1902 as a hunting retreat for Pennsylvania Railroad heir Frank Graham Thompson. The complex was served by a specially built railroad siding in Redden Crossroads. The camp fell into disuse during the Great Depression and was acquired by the state of Delaware in the 1930s. It saw use by the Civilian Conservation Corps, then the complex and the surrounding property were designated Redden State Forest in 1937.

== Description ==
The present complex comprises three buildings, all of wood-frame construction using cypress timber frames. The stable and forester's house are at the entrance to the property. The lodge is about 1,400 feet (430 m) to the east, about 800 feet (240 m) from the rail line. The lodge is a shallow V-shape in plan, of 1 1/2 stories on a brick foundation with no basement, with cypress shingle siding. The roof, originally covered with wood shingles, is now covered in asphalt shingles, with broad overhanging eaves. The central portion is seven bays wide, flanked by wings of seven bays each. The center portion contains a large lobby with exposed roof structure and two large brick fireplaces. This space is flanked by a dining room and a smaller gun room. The dining room contains wood paneling reputedly taken from an 18th-century Long Island house. The lodge retains its original Mission style furnishings, although the south wings was reconstructed following fire damage from a 1970 lightning strike. Cedar shingles replaced the cypress in the reconstruction.

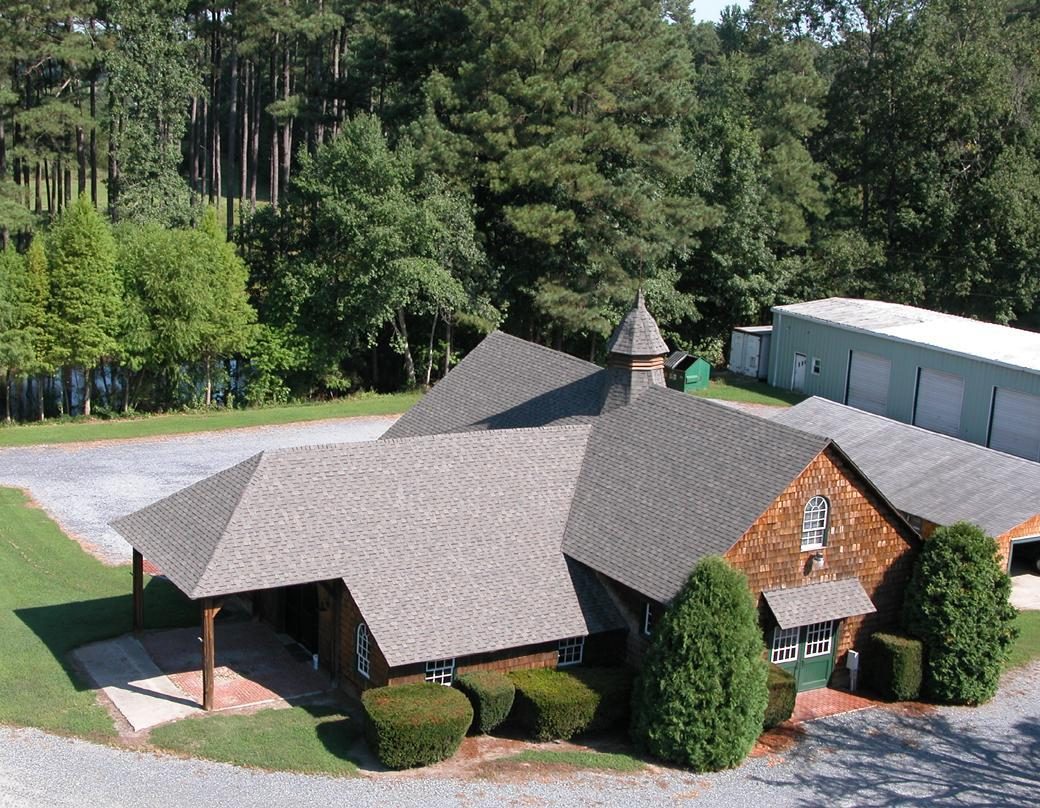
Redden stables

The stable is T-shaped. The front of the stable is a projecting porch under a deeply hooded hipped roof, with a large arched doorway leading into a carriage house. On either side wings extend under the extended roof with additional storage on the north side and a tack room on the south side. Stabling was to the rear, with the original eight stalls now removed. The attic space over the entry is finished. An octagonal cupola tops the center of the roof. A matching kennel formerly stood to the rear of the stable, but was demolished after 1937.

The forester's house differs from the stable and the lodge, with Colonial Revival detailing added to the shingle style. The house has a gambrel roof with three dormers on each side and a full basement. A porch extends across the central portion of the rear of the house, accessed by two French doors The interior comprises a living room, dining room, hallway and kitchen on the first floor, with six bedrooms on the second floor. A nearby garage matches the house.

== Present use ==
The Redden Forest Education Center houses displays and classroom space for school activities and tours. It is managed by the Delaware Department of Agriculture Forestry division.

The Redden complex was placed on the National Register of Historic Places on November 25, 1980.
