= Deep Creek Preserve (Volusia County, Florida) =

Preserve in Florida

Coordinates: 28°58′20″N 81°09′05″W

Deep Creek Preserve is an 8,040 acre conservation area in Volusia County, Florida. The preserve was created in 2010 after the county purchased a ranch. The preserve protects water supplies and is part of a wildlife corridor connecting the Everglades in south Florida to Okefenokee National Wildlife Refuge on the Florida/Georgia line.

The preserve is owned by Volusia County and the St. Johns River Water Management District.

== History ==
Part of the preserve was owned by the Leffler family and purchased in 2010 for preservation. The property was known as the Leffler Ranch. It was purchased for $28.8 million. An additional parcel was purchased in 2011 from Kemcho for $9.86 million.

== Ecology ==
Water quality in the Deep Creek stream is monitored. There is a Deep Creek Diversion Canal. An Eco Buggy ride event was held at the preserve in 2019. Kemcho land was purchased in 2011 for $9.6 million.

Hiking biking and horseback riding are allowed in trails in the preserve.
