= Lake Station Community Schools =

School district in Indiana

Address
- 2500 Pike Street Lake Station, Indiana, 46405; United States
- Coordinates: 41°34′22″N 87°14′41″W

District information
- Grades: K-12
- Superintendent: Tom Cripliver
- Schools: 3

Students and staff
- Enrollment: 1,177 (2020-21)
- Faculty: 64.05 (on an FTE basis)
- Staff: 150.05 (on an FTE basis)
- Student–teacher ratio: 18.38
- Athletic conference: Greater South Shore Conference
- District mascot: Fighting Eagles

Other information
- Website: www.lakes.k12.in.us

Lake Station Community Schools is a school district headquartered in Lake Station, Indiana, United States. The district serves most of Lake Station.

== Schools ==
Lake Station has two elementary schools and a secondary school.

=== Primary schools ===
- Virgil I. Bailey Elementary School
- Alexander Hamilton Elementary School

=== Secondary school ===
- Thomas A. Edison Junior-Senior High School
