= Deep Creek (Colorado River tributary) =

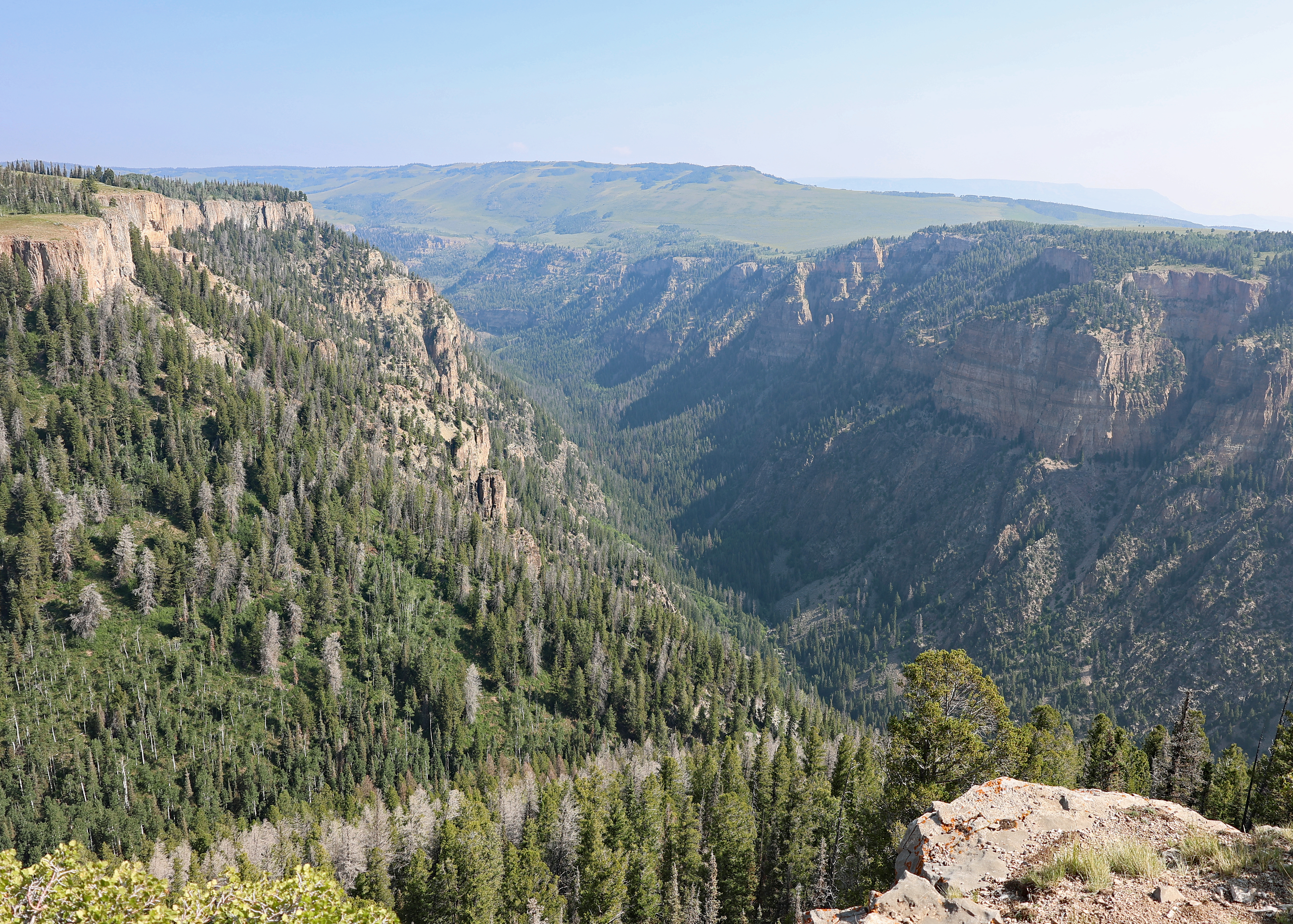
- Deep Creek Canyon and Deep Creek, viewed from the Deep Creek Overlook on a smoky day

- Location of the mouth of Deep Creek in Colorado

Physical characteristics
- Source
  - location: northwest of Carbonate, Colorado
  - coordinates: 39°45′56.93″N 107°21′23.20″W
  - elevation: 10,900 feet (3,300 meters)
- Mouth
  - location: Confluence with the Colorado
  - coordinates: 39°40′7.94″N 107°4′2.17″W
  - elevation: 6,161 feet (1,878 meters)

Basin features
- Progression: Colorado
- Tributaries
  - left: Upper Short Creek, Jack Creek
  - right: White Owl Creek

Deep Creek is a tributary of the Colorado River in Garfield and Eagle counties, Colorado, U.S. It is notable for Deep Creek Canyon, a picturesque, remote, rugged, and deep canyon.

== Course ==
Deep Creek rises high in Colorado's White River Plateau in the White River National Forest northeast of the town of Carbonate, Colorado and west of Bison Lake. From there, it flows east and is impounded by Heart Lake Reservoir. Leaving the reservoir, it passes through Deep Lake and then flows generally southeast. It turns southernly through Deep Creek Canyon and then turns east and then southeast until its confluence with the Colorado River along Colorado River Road north of Dotsero.

== Deep Creek Canyon ==
The creek passes through a deep and picturesque canyon called Deep Creek Canyon. The creek descends nearly 4,300 feet (1,300 meters) from Deep Lake downstream to its confluence with the Colorado River.

There is a vertical a drop that forms a deep canyon with vertical cliffs and slopes that make up the canyon walls. The most common way to observe the canyon, given its inaccessibility, is from the Deep Creek Overlook, located 2,300 feet (700 meters) above the floor of the canyon along Coffee Pot Road. A 2015 report found that the portion of the creek that flows through the canyon is "suitable for inclusion in the National Wild and Scenic River System (listings maintained by the National Park Service of the United States Department of the Interior)." However, the creek canyon has not gained any new official recognition, but advocacy groups, such as American Rivers, continue to draw attention to Deep Creek Canyon, hoping that the United States Congress will eventually preserve and declare it a Wild and Scenic River.

== Deep Creek Day Use Area ==
Most of the creek lies within the White River National Forest, but the section of the creek between Deep Creek canyon and the creek's mouth is owned and managed by the Bureau of Land Management. The agency manages a day use area that offers fishing, wildlife viewing, and camping.

== See also ==
- List of rivers of Colorado
