= River Forest Community School Corporation =

School district in Indiana

River Forest Community School Corporation is a school district headquartered in New Chicago, Indiana. The district serves New Chicago, portions of Lake Station, portions of Hobart, unincorporated sections of Lake County, and portions of Gary.

In 2015, River Forest advocated for in the community to pass a referendum of $0.42 on assessed value to help the school district. In 2019, the school district is now asking for $1.19 on assessed value to take advantage of re-claiming money lost to the 2020 circuit breaker in Lake County, Indiana.

== Compliance problems ==
Per SBOA report #B49917, monies have been mismanaged by River Forest resulting in understatements, and accounts being overdrawn.

Since 2020, SBOA reports including #82763F, show that the corporation has successfully implemented procedures to fix previous mismanagements resulting in positive audit reports.

== Schools ==
=== Secondary schools ===
- River Forest High School (Lake Station)
- River Forest Middle School (Lake Station)

=== Elementary schools ===
- Henry S. Evans Elementary School (Lake Station)
- John I. Meister Elementary School (Unincorporated area)
