= Deep Creek, New South Wales (Kempsey) =

Deep Creek
- Town
- Coordinates: 30°57′54″S 152°42′04″E
- Country: Australia
- State: New South Wales
- Region: Mid North Coast
- LGA: Kempsey Shire
- Location: 20 km (12 mi) W of Kempsey; 450 km (280 mi) N of Sydney

Government
  - State electorate: Oxley
  - Federal division: Cowper

Population
  - Total: 88 (2016 census)
- Postcode: 2440
- County: Dudley
- Parish: Burragong

Deep Creek is a locality in Kempsey Shire in New South Wales, Australia. It lies about 20 km west of Kempsey on the road to Armidale and 450 km northeast of Sydney. At the 2016 census, it had a population of 88.
