= Nanticoke Wildlife Area =

Protected area in Delaware, United States

Coordinates: 38°35′N 75°40′W

Nanticoke Wildlife Area is a state wildlife area located in Sussex County, Delaware, along the Nanticoke River and Broad Creek, near to Seaford, Delaware, and Bethel, Delaware. There is a monument commemorating Captain John Smith's journey into the Chesapeake Bay and its tributaries at Phillips Landing along Broad Creek, a tributary of the Nanticoke River in Delaware. It is made up of three large land tracts totaling 4,510 acres (1,825 ha), it is managed by Delaware Department of Natural Resources and Environmental Control (DNREC), Division of Fish and Wildlife. The area also holds one of the few Delmarva fox squirrel populations within Delaware, along with controlled populations in Prime Hook Wildlife Refuge and Assawoman Wildlife Area.
