= Deep Creek (Nanticoke River tributary) =

Deep Creek Tributary to Nanticoke River
- Location of Deep Creek mouth Deep Creek (Nanticoke River tributary) (the United States)

Location
- Country: United States
- State: Delaware
- County: Sussex

Physical characteristics
- Source: divide between Deep Creek and Broadkill River in Redden State Forest
  - location: Redden Crossroads, Delaware
  - coordinates: 38°44′01″N 075°25′11″W
  - elevation: 42 ft (13 m)
- Mouth: Nanticoke River
  - location: Seaford, Delaware
  - coordinates: 38°44′39″N 075°35′18″W
  - elevation: 0 ft (0 m)
- Length: 14.0 mi (22.5 km)
- Basin size: 64.87 square miles (168.0 km^{2})
- Discharge
  - average: 78.25 cu ft/s (2.216 m^{3}/s) at mouth with Nanticoke River

Basin features
- Progression: Nanticoke River → Chesapeake Bay → Atlantic Ocean
- River system: Nanticoke River
- Tributaries
  - left: Mifflin Ditch; McColleys Branch; Rum Bridge Branch; Tyndall Branch; Baker Mill Branch; Tubbs Branch
  - right: Shorts Ditch
- Waterbodies: Concord Pond

Deep Creek is a 14.0-mile-long (22.5 km) tributary of the Nanticoke River that rises in the Redden area and flows southwest towards Seaford, Delaware.
