= Deep River (Jon Allen album) =

Studio album by Jon Allen
- Released: 7 July 2014
- Genre: Folk rock
- Length: 39:59
- Label: OK! Good Records
- Producer: Jon Allen

Jon Allen chronology
Sweet Defeat (2011)	Deep River (2014)	Blue Flame (2018)

Professional ratings
Review scores
Source	Rating
Mojo	4/5 stars
Q	4/5 stars
Uncut	7/10

Deep River is the third studio album by British singer-songwriter and musician Jon Allen, released on 7 July 2014 on the label OK Good Records in the UK.

== Track listing ==
No.	Title	Writer(s)	Length
1.	"Night & Day"	Jon Allen	4:14
2.	"Lady of the Water"	Jon Allen	3:14
3.	"Falling Back"	Jon Allen	3:14
4.	"Hummingbird Blues"	Jon Allen	3:34
5.	"Fire in My Heart"	Jon Allen	3:30
6.	"Deep River"	Jon Allen	3:54
7.	"Wait for Me"	Jon Allen	3:20
8.	"Get What's Mine"	Jon Allen	4:51
9.	"Loving Arms"	Jon Allen	3:40
10.	"All the Money's Gone"	Jon Allen	3:34
11.	"Keep Moving On"	Jon Allen	2:54

== Charts ==
Chart performance for Deep River
Chart (2014)	Peak position
Dutch Albums (Album Top 100)	88
