= Deep River, Indiana =

- Unincorporated community
- Location in Indiana Deep River (the United States)
- Coordinates: 41°28′32″N 87°13′24″W
- Country: United States
- State: Indiana
- County: Lake
- Township: Ross
- Elevation: 650 ft (200 m)
- Time zone: UTC-6 (CST)
  - Summer (DST): UTC-5 (CDT)
- ZIP code: 46342 (Hobart)
- Area code: 219
- FIPS code: 18-17265
- GNIS feature ID: 449646

Deep River is an unincorporated community in Ross Township, Lake County, Indiana.

== History ==
Deep River, originally called Woodvale, is a community that sprang up around a mill started by John Wood in 1835.
