= Old Furnace, Delaware =

Unincorporated community in Delaware, United States

- Unincorporated community
- Location within the state of Delaware Old Furnace, Delaware (the United States)
- Coordinates: 38°40′1″N 75°31′1″W
- Country: United States
- State: Delaware
- County: Sussex
- Time zone: UTC-5 (Eastern (EST))
  - Summer (DST): UTC-4 (EDT)
- FIPS code: 54340
- GNIS feature ID: 216167

Old Furnace is an unincorporated community located in Sussex County, Delaware, United States. The community is located in a rural area a few miles east of Seaford and approximately 40 miles (64 km) south of Dover. It is adjacent to the Old Furnace Wildlife Area.

The community is part of the Salisbury, Maryland-Delaware Metropolitan Statistical Area.
