= List of Delaware state forests =

Delaware has three state forests, one in each county, totaling more than 19,000 acres (77 km^{2}). These natural resource areas are managed by the Delaware Department of Agriculture Forest Service.

see also Delaware State Forests

== Blackbird State Forest ==
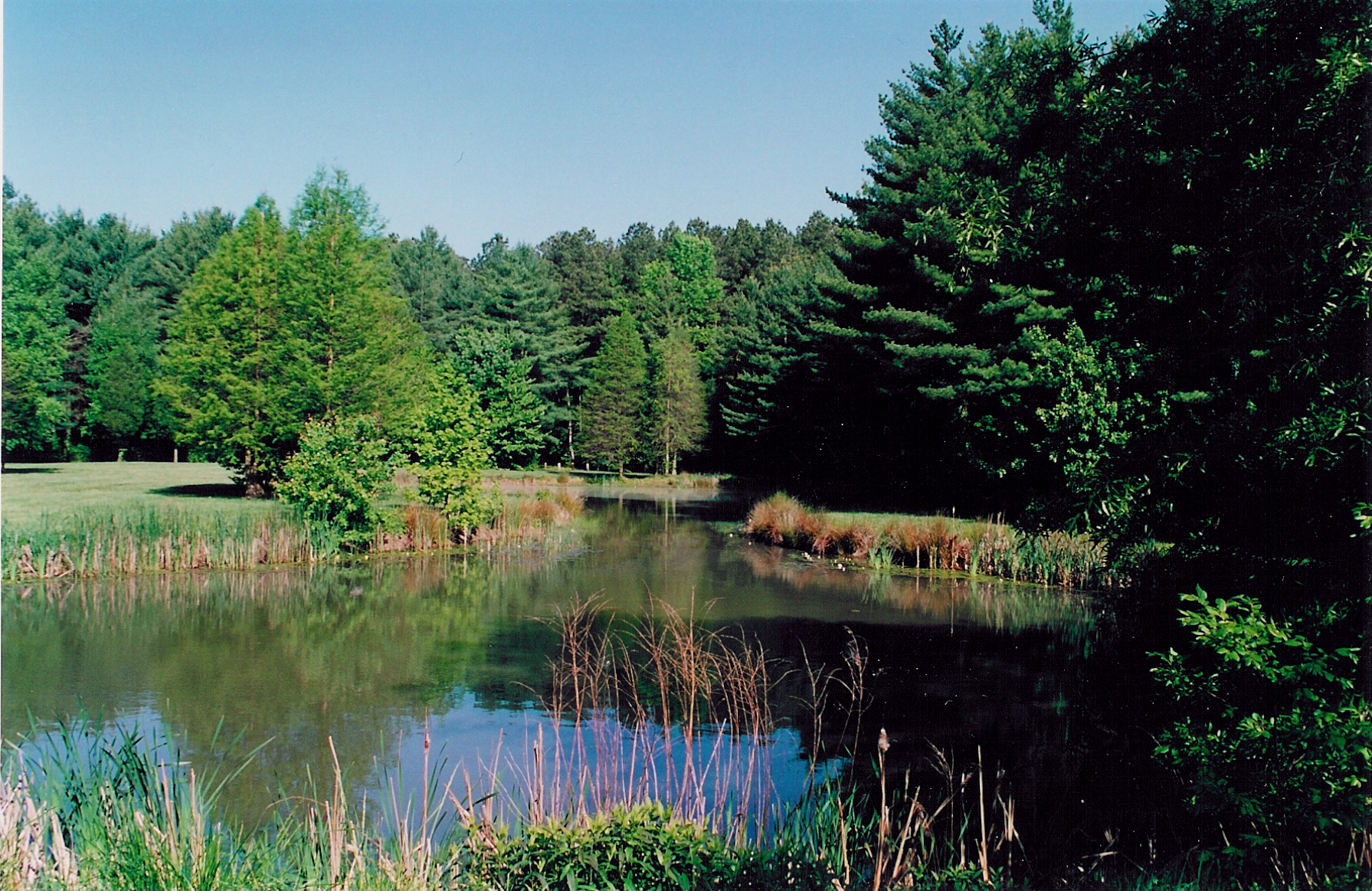
Blackbird Pond is located on the Meadows Tract of Blackbird State Forest in New Castle County, Delaware

Located north of Smyrna, Blackbird State Forest covers approximately 5,400 acres (22 km^{2}) on the border of New Castle/Kent counties. The ten tracts of Blackbird State Forest are open to the public for nature walks, hiking, jogging, and horseback riding all year. It features a 1/2-mile, wheelchair-accessible wildlife and nature interpretation trail on the Tybout Tract and the Blackbird Education Center on the Meadows Tract. Long-range management plans for Blackbird State Forest outline goals for timber production, wildlife habitat, recreation, soil and water protection, wetland and endangered species protection, and public education.

Many educational programs are available at the Blackbird State Forest Education Center on the Meadows Tract. Complementing a center at Redden State Forest, the facility has two meeting spaces and interactive displays: The Life Cycle of a Forest, Tree Identification, Invasive Species, Urban/Community Forestry, and Wildland Firefighting. Visitors can see a diorama of a beaver pond, a working beehive, and exotic and native insects. Work has also begun on a new nature trail, demonstration saw mill, and arboretum.

=== History ===
As a state forest, Blackbird began with the 1941 acquisition of the Tybout Tract, purchased for $6,916.20 when land prices in New Castle County presented a rare opportunity for the Forestry Department. 1941’s Annual Report of the Forestry Department stated:

“For many years there has been a marked public concern over the failure of the Department to acquire State Forest lands in New Castle County but with only income funds at the disposal of the Department for acquisition purposes it has been expedient to spend those funds where the greatest acreage could be acquired per dollar expended. However, with the offer of a block of land in lower New Castle County at a figure comparable to similar lands in Sussex County the handicap of price was removed and the department has succeeded in acquiring 672 acres. . . lying west of Blackbird in New Castle County.”

== Redden State Forest ==
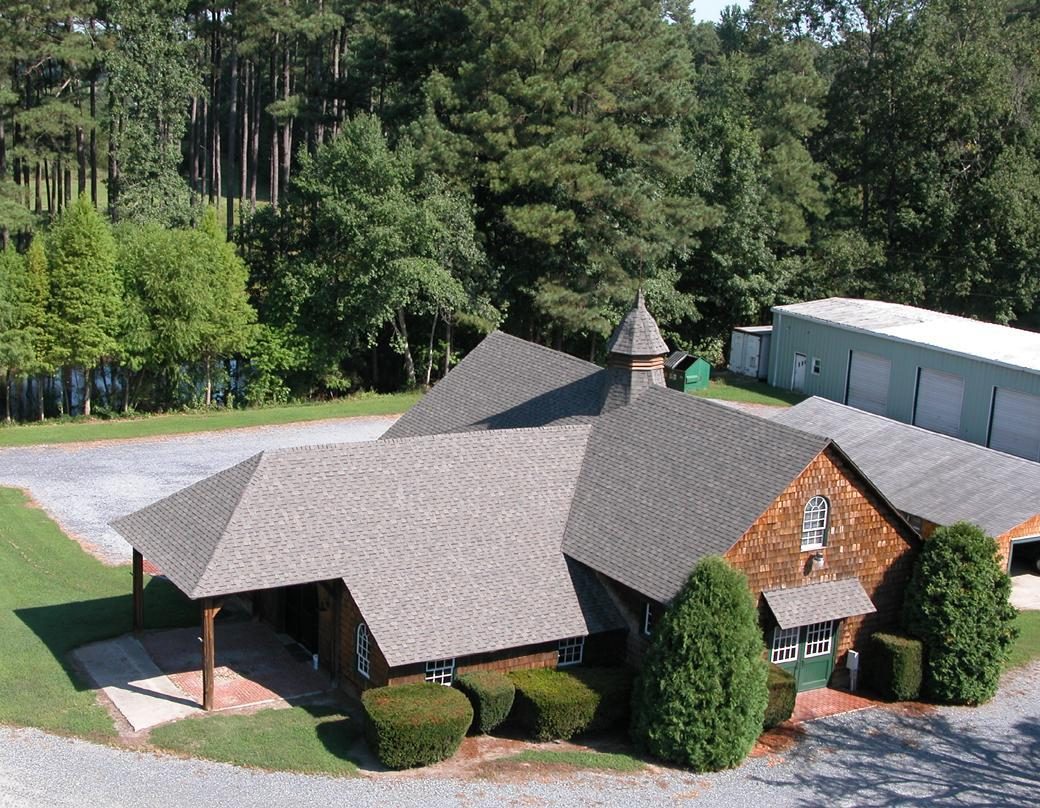
The Redden Forest Education Center can be found on the Headquarters Tract of Redden State Forest in Sussex County, Delaware

Redden State Forest contains 18 separate tracts covering over 12,000 acres (49 km^{2}) in Sussex County just north of Georgetown, the county seat. The modern Redden State Forest is the consolidation of several Sussex County forest tracts, including the Ellendale State Forest. The Ellendale State Forest Picnic Facility was listed on the National Register of Historic Places in 1991. The first land was acquired in 1928, and since then the forest has continued to grow, with acquisitions as late as 2008. Popular activities at the forest include in-season hunting, horseback-riding, nature observation, and hiking.

Redden State Forest is also home to one of Delaware's two forest education centers. The Redden Forest Education Center includes exhibits on the history of forestry in Delaware, forest pests, urban forestry, and the importance of forests within watersheds.

=== History ===
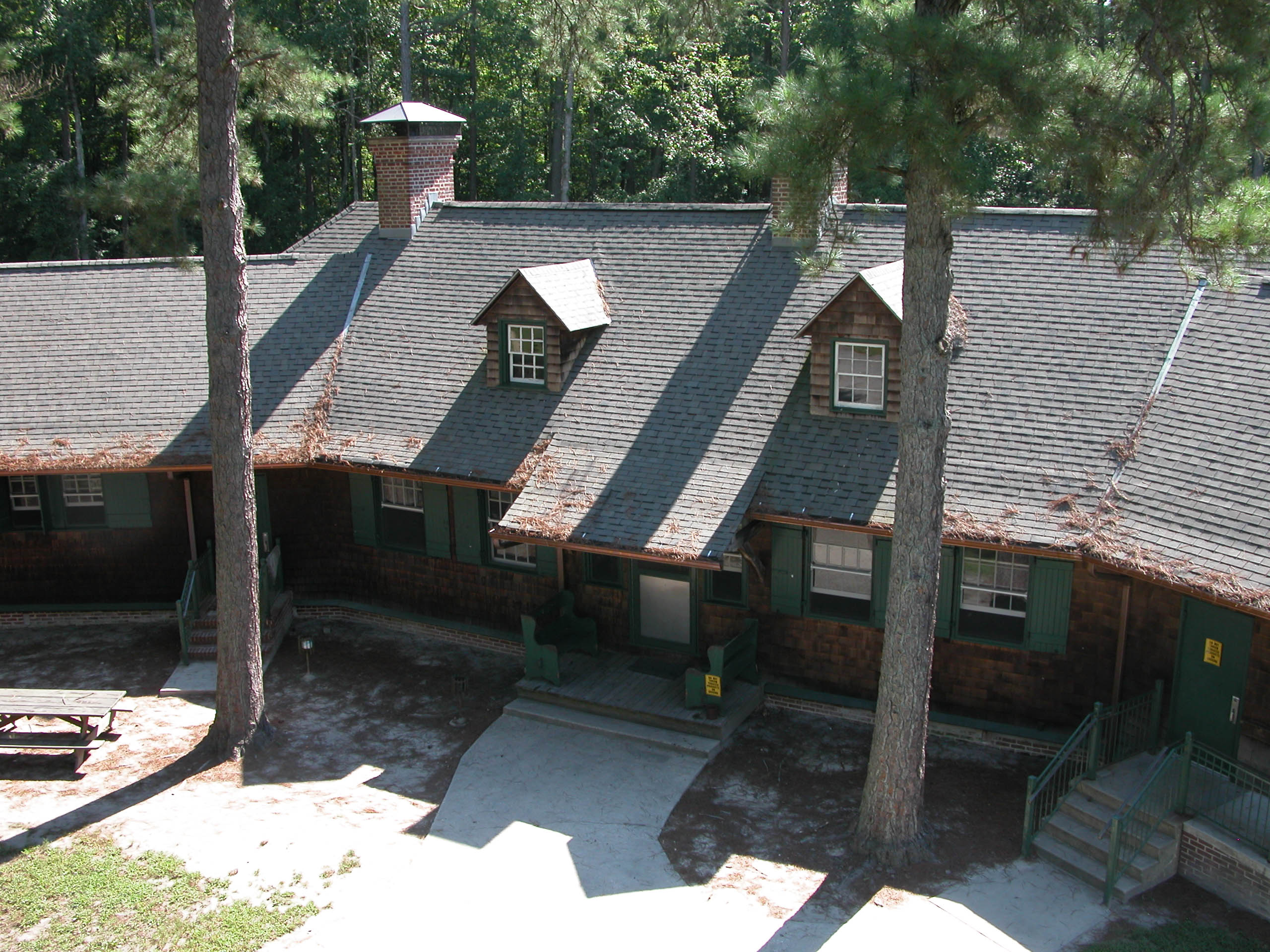
Redden Lodge was built around 1903 and is listed on the National Register of Historic Places. It can be found on the Headquarters Tract of Redden State Forest in Sussex County, Delaware

Much of Redden State Forest’s history is tied to the railroad. The Junction & Breakwater Railroad, one of Delaware’s earliest rail systems, was completed in 1868. A railroad station was established in 1870 near what would later become Redden State Forest. The station was originally known as Carey’s Station, but a short time later was renamed for Col. William O. Redden. Col. Redden played a prevalent role in Sussex County as he served in the Civil War, was sheriff of Sussex County from 1838–1840, a member of Delaware’s House of Representatives from 1840–1846, including Speaker of the House in 1843, and was instrumental in establishing a railroad system in Delaware.

In 1877 a 230-acre (0.93 km^{2}) farm near the Redden Station and owned by William W. Donovan proceeded through Orphan’s Court following his death. This land is now a portion of Redden State Forest’s Headquarters Tract. Transcripts of the court proceedings mention a large, two-story dwelling with an attached single story, which fits the description of Redden State Forest’s Manager’s House (currently the Redden office).

Charles C. Stockley, the Governor of Delaware from 1872 to 1876, purchased the Donovan Farm in 1879. In 1901 Frank Thompson purchased 844 acres (3.42 km^{2}) of land including the original 230-acre (0.93 km^{2}) Donovan Farm. Mr. Thompson was the son of the president of the Pennsylvania Railroad Company. In 1903 the club house (Redden Lodge) appeared on Sussex County tax records. From 1903 to 1919 the Lodge was used by Pennsylvania Railroad Company officials and guests for hunting (primarily quail, since much of the surrounding area at that time was fields and hedgerows). Visitors arrived at the Redden Station by train from Philadelphia and proceeded to the Lodge by horse and buggy. The carriages and horses were kept in the Horse Barn, which is now the Redden Education Center.

In 1936 under the leadership of Delaware’s first State Forester, William S. Taber, the State Forestry Department purchased the 844 acres (3.42 km^{2}) that is now the Headquarters Tract from Richard Houghton, who had acquired the property following its use by the Pennsylvania Railroad Company. Since that time, the Headquarters Tract has grown to over 1,800 acres (7.3 km^{2}). On July 4, 1970, lightning struck the Lodge, and the resulting fire burned the entire west wing and kitchen. The burned section was rebuilt in 1976. In 1990 the Lodge, Manager’s House, and Horse Barn were placed on the National Register of Historic Places.

The Delaware Forest Service acquired funding from the Delaware General Assembly and, working with the Delaware Department of Administrative Services, Division of Facilities Management, renovated these historic structures. The Redden Lodge was rededicated in 1996, the Manager’s House opened as the Redden office in 1998, and the Horse Barn opened in 2000 as the Education Center. These three structures are now the centerpiece of Redden State Forest.

== Taber State Forest ==
Taber State Forest covers over 1,200 acres (4.9 km^{2}) in Kent County and is located 10 miles (16 km) southwest of Harrington. Parker Road south off of Delaware Route 14, and the Maryland state line generally form the western boundary. About 17 acres (69,000 m^{2}) actually extends westward into the state of Maryland. Burrsville Road running southeast from Parker Road cuts through near the center of the land holdings. Saulsbury Creek Road generally forms a boundary for the southwest extent of the property.

Taber State Forest is a primitive use facility and there is no formal office onsite. It is primarily used for hunting, hiking, and wildlife habitat. In addition, the forest is also managed for timber production.

=== History ===
Although officially dedicated in 1994, the origin of Taber State Forest was 1984, when the Delaware Forest Service received the 350-acre (1.4 km^{2}) Saulsbury Farm. Also included at Taber State Forest is the building known as the Smith School House (now a residence on the property). The Cooper and Cooper Study (found in the holdings of the Delaware Division of Historical and Cultural Affairs) describes the Smith School as a one-teacher schoolhouse with an average student population of 23. The school operated 180 days of the year.

Saulsbury Farm Gravesite: The Saulsbury Tract is home of the Saulsbury family burial grave, which contains a memorial to Gove Saulsbury, the 41st governor of Delaware (1865–1871). This historic gravesite is approximately 50 ft (15 m). by 75 ft (23 m). with 16 graves. The site has one large group monument and three small grave stones with a two-rail split rail fence around the site. Deed restrictions state this parcel must remain as a burial site and be maintained as such.

== See also ==
- List of national forests of the United States
