= Concord, Delaware =

Unincorporated community in Delaware, United States

- Unincorporated community
- Location within Delaware Location within the United States
- Coordinates: 38°38′31″N 75°33′19″W
- Country: United States
- State: Delaware
- County: Sussex
- Elevation: 26 ft (7.9 m)
- Time zone: UTC-5 (Eastern (EST))
  - Summer (DST): UTC-4 (EDT)
- Area code: 302
- GNIS feature ID

Concord is an unincorporated community in Sussex County, Delaware, United States. Concord is located along Delaware Route 20, east of Seaford.

Concord, Sussex County, Delaware should not be confused with Concord, New Castle County, Delaware; the latter is a populated place located in Wilmington, bordering the northern edge of the city along Delaware Route 202.

== History ==
Concord originally had several bog-iron furnaces in the area in the late 18th and early 19th centuries. The Pine Grove Furnace Site was listed on the National Register of Historic Places in 1978.

Concord's population was 300 in 1890, 269 in 1900, 315 in 1925, and 400 in 1960.
