= Gary Charter Schools =

- Charter Schools Association of Indiana logo

Location
- Gary, Indiana; United States

Information
- Type: Charter
- Established: N/A
- Authorizer: Ball State University
- Website: Charter Schools Association of Indiana

Gary Charter Schools serve students who reside in Gary, Indiana, United States. Though operated by different corporations, all current charter schools in Gary are sponsored by Ball State University.

== Uniforms ==
All students are required to wear school uniforms.

== Schools ==
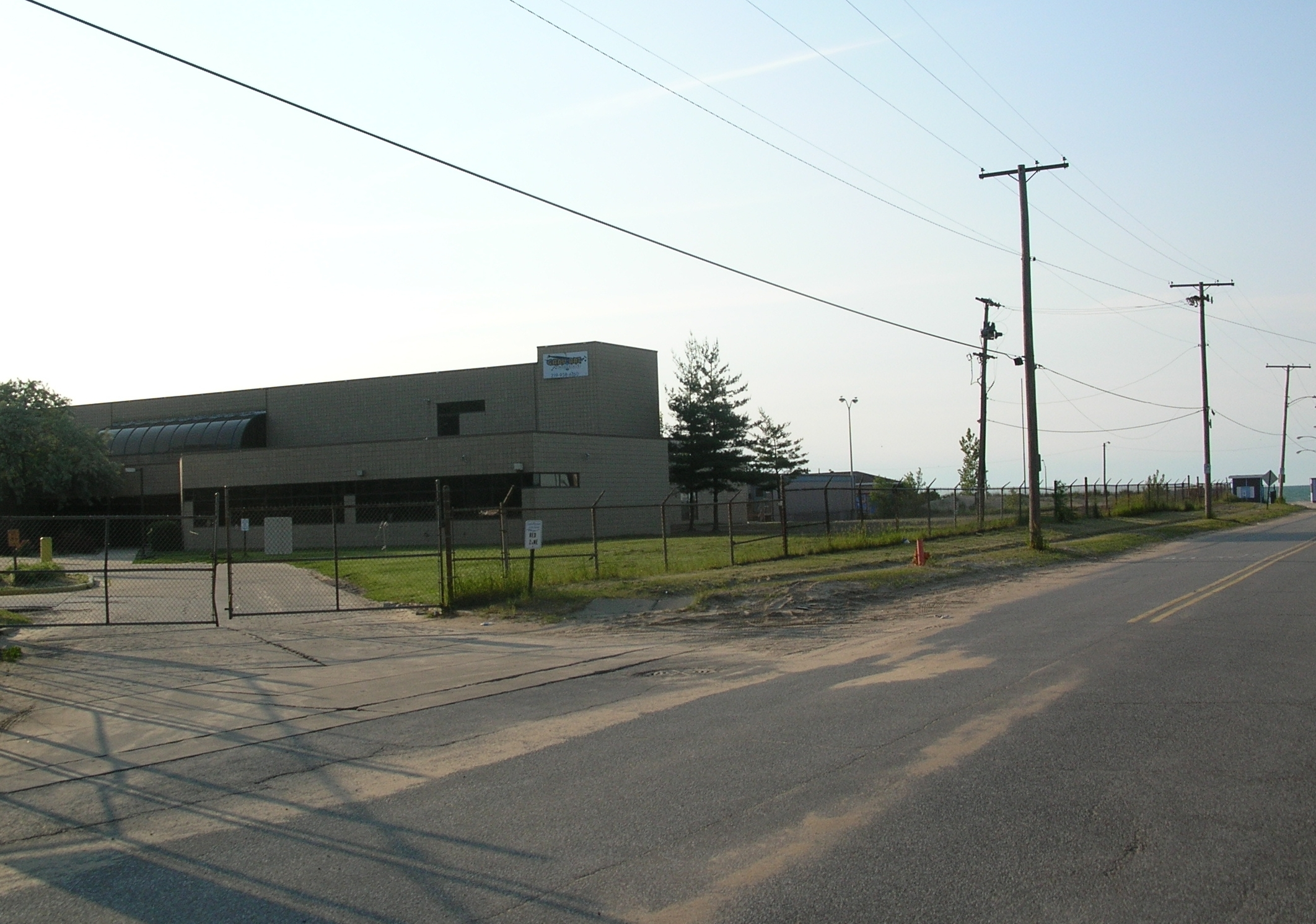
Charter School of the Dunes, on Lake Michigan in Miller Beach

=== K-12 ===
- 21st Century Charter School of Gary
- Steel City Academy

=== 5 ===
- Lead College Prep Charter School

=== K-8 ===
- Thea Bowman Leadership Academy

=== K-8 ===
- Charter School of the Dunes

=== K-5 ===
- Gary Lighthouse Charter School
- West Gary Lighthouse Charter School

== See also ==
- Gary Community School Corporation
- Lake Ridge Schools Corporation
- List of schools in Gary
