= 1913 New York City mayoral election =

- November 1913
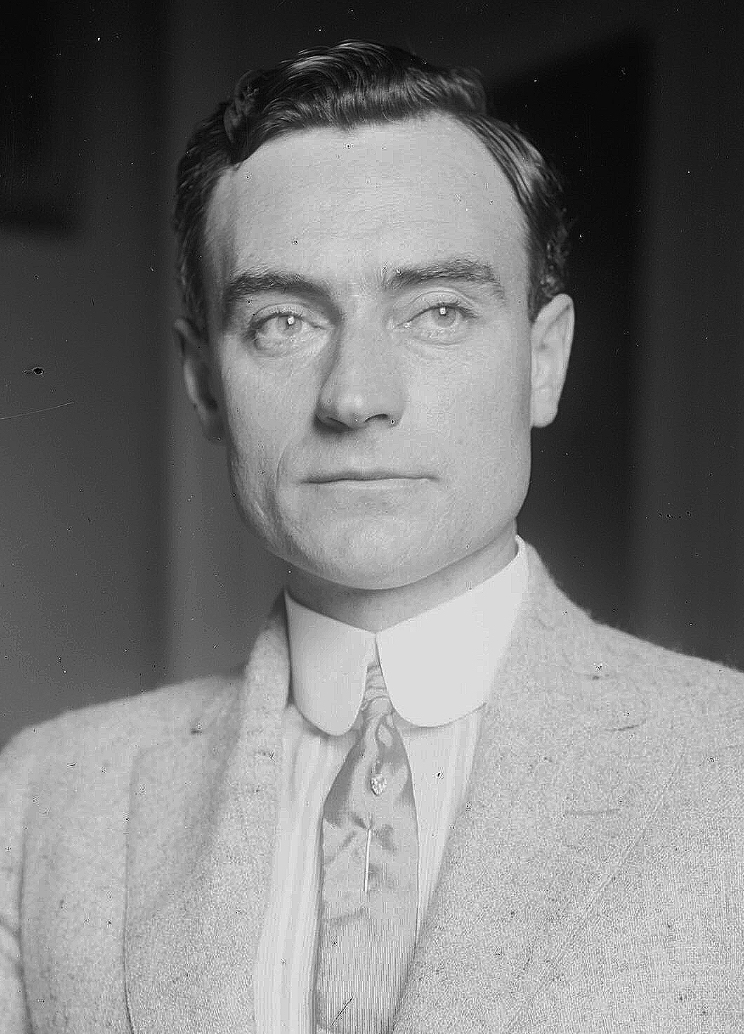

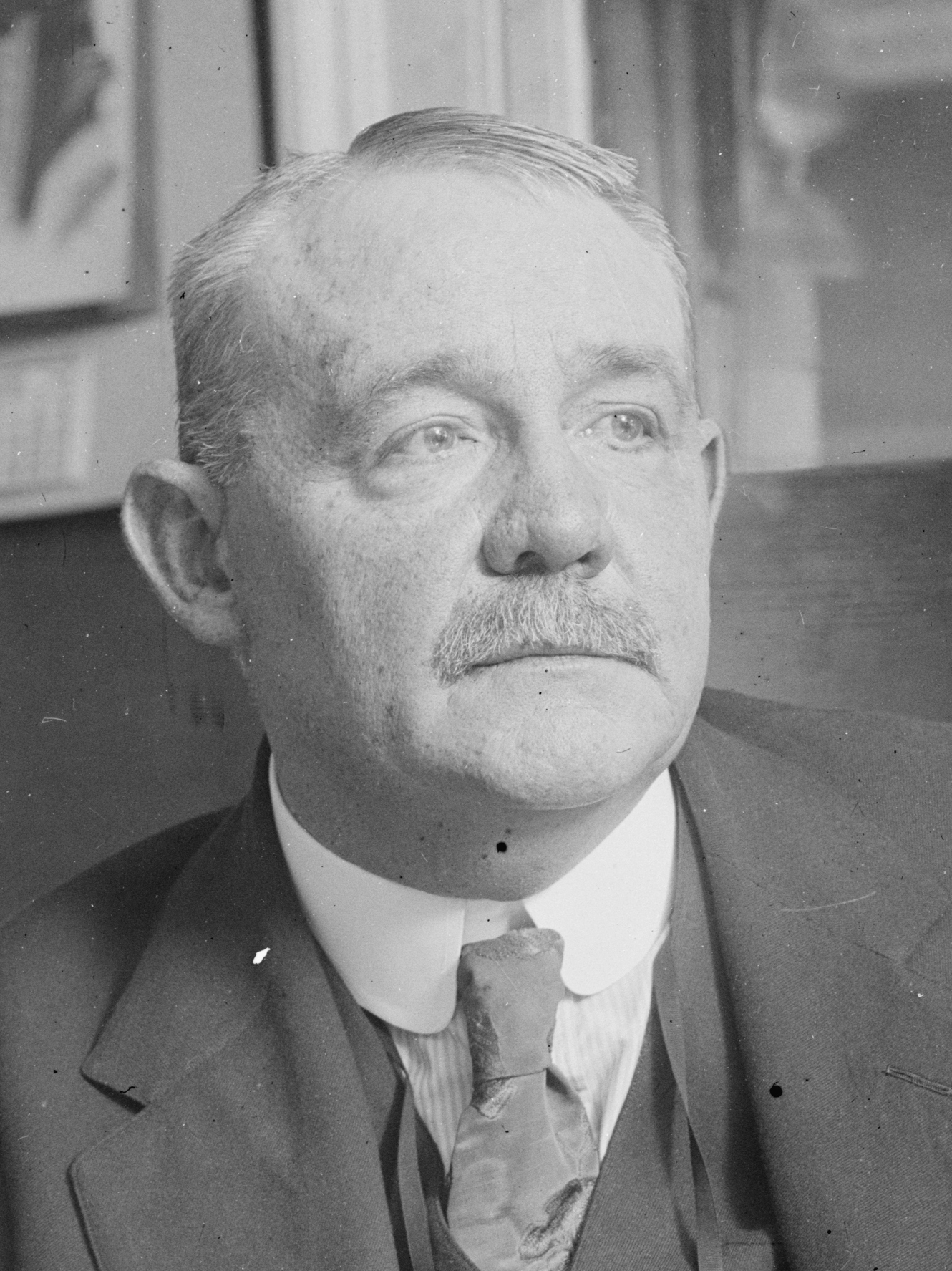

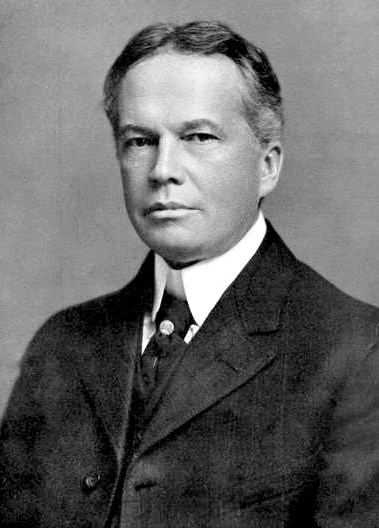
| Nominee | John P. Mitchel | Edward E. McCall | Charles Edward Russell |
| Party | Fusion | Democratic | Socialist |
| Alliance | Republican |
| Popular vote | 358,181 | 233,919 | 32,057 |
| Percentage | 57.1% | 37.3% | 5.1% |
- Borough results Mitchel: 50–60% 60–70%
Mayor before election
Ardolph Loges Kline
Republican
Elected mayor
John P. Mitchel
Fusion

An election for Mayor of New York City was held in November 1913.

Incumbent mayor William Jay Gaynor died on September 10. In the race to succeed him, Republican John Purroy Mitchel, running on an independent fusion ticket, defeated Democratic judge Edward E. McCall and Socialist newspaper editor Charles Edward Russell in a landslide.

== Fusion nomination ==
As the 1913 mayoral election approached, the Citizens Municipal Committee of 107 set out to find a candidate that would give New York "a non-partisan, efficient and progressive government". They were assisted in this endeavor by the Fusion Executive Committee, led by Joseph M. Price of the City Club of New York. After nine ballots, John Purroy Mitchel was nominated as a candidate for mayor. During his campaign, Mitchel focused on modernizing and fighting corruption in the city government.

== General election ==
=== Candidates ===
- Edward E. McCall, Supreme Court of New York judge (Democratic)
- John Purroy Mitchel, Collector of the Port of New York and former president of the board of aldermen (Fusion-Republican)
- Norman Raymond (Prohibition)
- Charles Edward Russell, newspaper writer and editor (Socialist)
- William Watters (Socialist Labor)

=== Results ===
1913 New York City mayoral election
| Party | Candidate | Votes | % |
|---|---|---|---|
| Fusion | John Purroy Mitchel | 358,181 | 57.1% |
| Democratic | Edward E. McCall | 233,919 | 37.3% |
| Socialist | Charles Edward Russell | 32,057 | 5.1% |
| Socialist Labor | William Watters | 1,647 | 0.3% |
| Prohibition | Norman Raymond | 1,213 | 0.2% |
| Total votes | | 627,017 | 100.00% |
| Fusion gain from Democratic | | | |

==== Results by borough ====
| 1913 | Party | The Bronx and Manhattan | Brooklyn | Queens | Richmond [Staten Is.] | Total | % |
| John Purroy Mitchel | Fusion | 178,224 | 137,074 | 34,279 | 8,604 | 358,181 | 57.1% |
| John Purroy Mitchel | Fusion | 54.7% | 60.2% | 59.6% | 54.4% | 358,181 | 57.1% |
| Edward E. McCall | Democratic | 129,113 | 77,826 | 20,097 | 6,883 | 233,919 | 37.3% |
| Edward E. McCall | Democratic | 39.6% | 34.2% | 35.0% | 43.3% | 233,919 | 37.3% |
| Charles Edward Russell | Socialist | 17,383 | 11,560 | 2,865 | 249 | 32,057 | 5.1% |
| William Walters | Socialist Labor | 952 | 538 | 129 | 28 | 1,647 | 0.3% |
| Norman Raymond | Prohibition | 412 | 587 | 118 | 96 | 1,213 | 0.2% |
| TOTAL | | 326,084 | 227,585 | 57,488 | 15,860 | 627,017 | |
