= Ralph Waldo Emerson School =

Ralph Waldo Emerson School may refer to:

- Ralph Waldo Emerson School (Gary, Indiana), listed on the NRHP in Lake County, Indiana
- Ralph Waldo Emerson Indianapolis Public School No. 58, Indianapolis, IN, listed on the NRHP in Indiana
- Ralph Waldo Emerson School (St. Louis, Missouri), listed on the National Register of Historic Places in St. Louis County, Missouri

== See also ==
- Emerson School (disambiguation)
