= Brandon Meeks =

American Jazz bassist

- Education: Columbia College Chicago
- Website: https://www.brandonmeeksmusic.com/

Brandon Meeks is an American Jazz bassist based in Indianapolis, Indiana. He appeared in the 2015 film "Miles Ahead" in the role of Ron Carter and is the first Hoosier recipient of Creative Capital's State of the Art Prize. Meeks also established the "3rd Sunday Jazz Concert" in 2022 as well as the “Unsung Giants” performance project in 2026.

== Early life and education ==
Meeks grew up in Gary, Indiana. He began taking guitar lessons at the age of nine after his mother mistakenly bought him a guitar instead of a bass. At the age of thirteen, Meeks began practicing bass.

While attending Wirt-Emerson School for Visual and Performing Arts in Gary for visual arts, Meeks was approached by a friend asking him to fill an opening for a bass player in the school's jazz band. At the time, Meeks was playing classical guitar on the side and had been wanting to pick up the bass for a while. When the opportunity to join his school's jazz band presented itself, Meeks took it.

Meeks, who is originally from Gary, moved to Indianapolis in 2004 after graduating from Columbia College in Chicago with a degree in graphic design.

== Career ==
In 2015, Meeks played the role of bassist Ron Carter in the Miles Davis biographical film "Miles Ahead". Meeks obtained this role playing alongside actor Don Cheadle after submitted a headshot and a short paragraph about himself to talent agency on a whim.

In 2022, aided by a $10,000 Art in Public Spaces grant from the Indy Arts Council as well as support from the Indianapolis Jazz Foundation, Meeks developed the “3rd Sunday Jazz Concert,” a free outdoor concert series. The concert series was created by Meeks with the intention of making live Jazz music more accessible to the Black youth of Indianapolis.

Meeks was announced to have won Creative Capital's State of the Art Prize in 2025. The prize included an unrestricted grant of $10,000 which Meeks used to develop his performance project, “Unsung Giants.” This new concert series was developed to honor Indiana's jazz history and living legends. Meeks was the first Hoosier to win the State of Art Prize. In the summer of 2026, "Unsung Giant" also functioned as the theme for Meeks' "3rd Sunday Jazz Concert". The concert series began on June 21, 2026, and took place at the Fort Ben Cultural Campus Amphitheater in Lawrence.
