= Theodore Roosevelt College and Career Academy =

Theodore Roosevelt College & Career Academy

Location
- 730 West 25th Avenue; Gary, Indiana 46407; United States; 41.5742°N 87.3454°W

Information
- Type: Charter school
- Established: 1921
- Oversight: EdisonLearning
- Principal: Joshua Batchelor Sr.
- Faculty: 27
- Enrollment: 602 (2013–14)
- Colors: Black and gold
- Athletics conference: Northwestern Conference
- Team name: Panthers
- Website: theodorerooseveltcca.org
- Theodore Roosevelt High School
- U.S. National Register of Historic Places
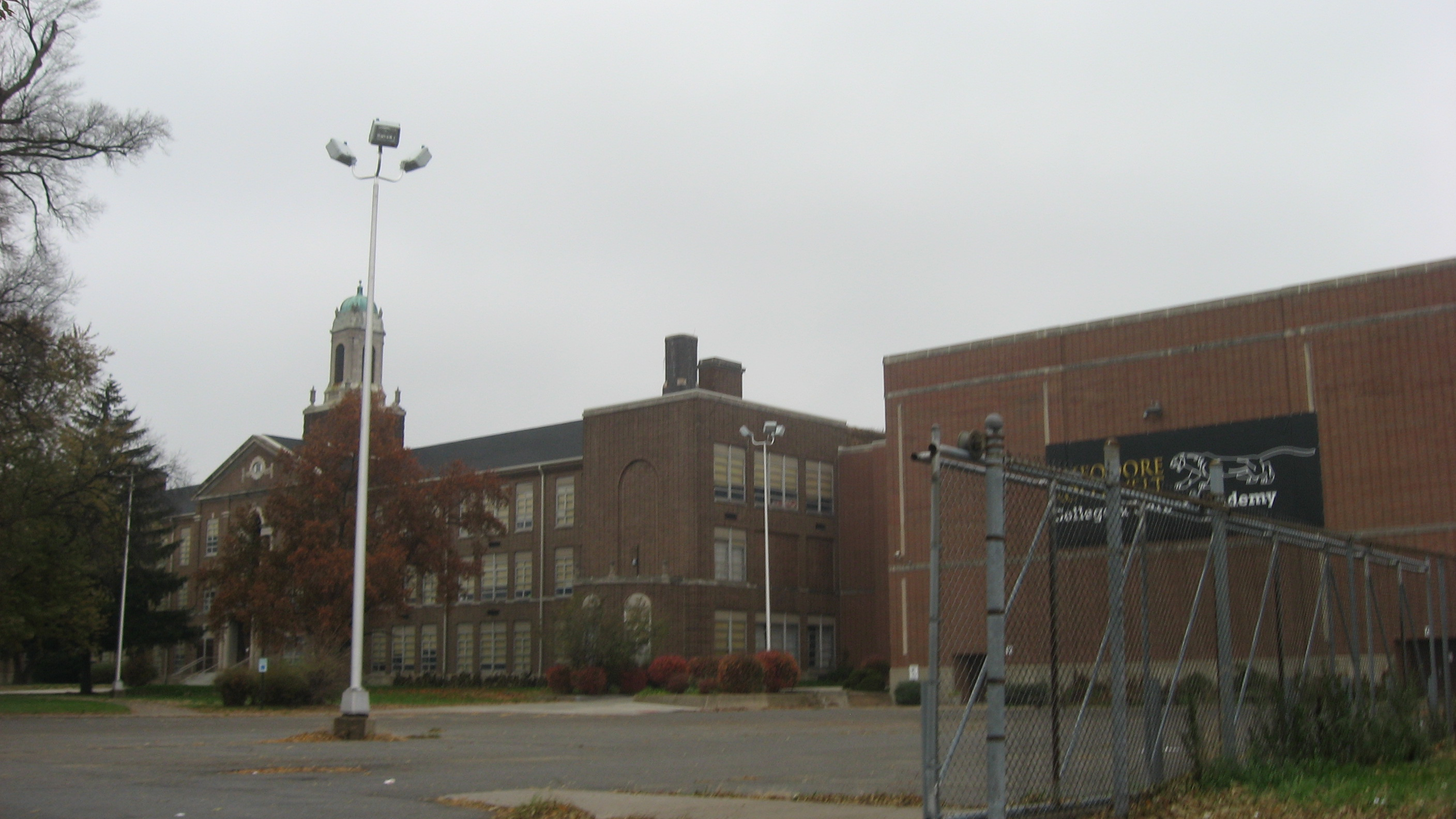
- Eastern side

- Location within Indiana Location within the United States
- Location: 730 W. 25th Ave., Gary, Indiana
- Area: 18 acres (7.3 ha)
- Built: 1930, 1946, 1968-1971
- Architect: Ittner, William Butts; Wildermuth, Joseph E.
- Architectural style: Colonial Revival
- MPS: Indiana's Public Common and High Schools
- NRHP reference No.: 12001059
- Added to NRHP: December 19, 2012

Theodore Roosevelt College and Career Academy (TRCCA), formerly known as Theodore Roosevelt High School and often referred to as Gary Roosevelt, was a charter school located in the Midtown neighborhood of Gary, Indiana, United States. In February 2020, the Distressed Unit Appeal Board voted to close Roosevelt after a series of burst pipes throughout the winter of 2019 left the school in need of expensive repairs. At the time of its closing, the school was managed by EdisonLearning and was divided into a senior and collegiate academy for grades 9–12 and a junior academy for grades 7–8. Roosevelt was part of the Gary Community School Corporation until 2012, when the Indiana Department of Education took control of the school due to poor academic performance and contracted with EdisonLearning to operate the school. Under Edison, Roosevelt was reorganized into academies and the school received its final name. Athletic teams at Roosevelt were known as the Panthers and the school colors were black and gold. Roosevelt was part of the Indiana High School Athletic Association as a member of the Northwestern Conference.

The origins of the school date to 1908, when a one-room school was established for Gary's African American children at Twelfth Avenue and Massachusetts Street. After portable classrooms were relocated to Twenty-fifth Avenue and Harrison Street the school was named the Roosevelt Annex. The school began offering secondary-level courses in 1925. In 1927, the Emerson School Strike prompted the city to officially segregate its schools by building a separate high school for Black students. The new building was designed by architect William Butts Ittner, constructed in 1929, and dedicated as Roosevelt High School in April 1931. It was named in honor of former U.S. President Theodore Roosevelt. The first graduation ceremony at the new high school was held in 1933. The Gary Roosevelt was developed during the early decades of the twentieth century as part of William Wirt's Gary System of education, which offered vocational training and college preparatory classes to high school students, as well as extracurricular activities and athletic programs. The school building was added to the National Register of Historic Places in December 2012.

== History ==
Theodore Roosevelt High School was named after Theodore Roosevelt, the twenty-sixth President of the United States.

The earliest school for African American children in Gary was built in 1908 as a one-room building on Twelfth Avenue and Massachusetts Street the same year that the city's school board made the decision to segregate its public schools. Students at the Twelfth Avenue school and those attending another school at Fourteenth Avenue and Connecticut Street were moved to Frederick Froebel School at Fifteenth and Madison Street.

Beginning in 1915, as Gary's population grew, some African American students transferred to portable classrooms on Twenty-first Avenue and Adams Street, as well as other segregated schools. The portable classrooms were moved in 1921 to Roosevelt High School's present-day site at Twenty-fifth Avenue and Harrison Street. The portable classrooms were renamed the Roosevelt Annex, a result of their location near Roosevelt School, also located on Twenty-fifth Avenue. In 1923, James Stanley, assumed duties as the principal of Roosevelt School, as well as the Annex. In 1925, the Annex began offering secondary school courses. In 1929, Frederick C. McFarlane succeeded Stanley as principal and a year later the school was accredited, graduating its first high school class in June 1930.

Although the city continued to maintain segregated schools, some black students were enrolled in schools designated for white students on a space-available basis. In September 1927, after eighteen black high school students were transferred to Emerson School, many of the school's white students walked out in protest, beginning what was called the Emerson School Strike. The four-day strike ended when a settlement was reached that called on the Gary city council to appropriate funds to construct what became known as Roosevelt High School, as well as a temporary school to help alleviate school overcrowding. Emerson's African American students were transferred to the temporary school after the resolution and funding appropriation for the school buildings were passed. Gary's mayor, Floyd E. Williams, assured the city's African American community that the new high school would have facilities "equal to existing high schools in the city, as well as having qualified teachers and staff." The ensuing formalization of Jim Crow segregation in Gary changed what had previously become nationally known as the Gary System. William Wirt, the city's first Superintendent of Schools, developed the Gary System during the early decades of the twentieth century. The Gary System offered vocational training and college preparatory classes in the city's high schools, as well as extracurricular activities and athletic programs, an innovative idea that influenced the development of modern education. The Gary System was adopted by other school districts across the United States. Roosevelt was admitted to the North Central Association of Schools and Colleges in 1931. The first graduation ceremonies were held in the new high school building in 1933 for a senior graduating class of thirty students.

In June 1933 McFarlane resigned the principalship of Roosevelt. In August 1933, the high school section of Pulaski was united with Roosevelt and H. Theo Tatum, who had been principal of East Pulaski School, became principal of the combined unit. Tatum retired in 1961. Tatum was succeeded as principal by Warren Anderson, who served until July 1970. Beginning in fall 1970, Robert E. Jones became principal. He served until 1990. David Williams served from 1990 to 1992 as head principal. William Reese Jr. served as head principal from 1992 until fall 1997. The next principal, Edward B. Lumpkin Sr., began his job as head principal in 1997. Lumpkin retired from this position on June 30, 1999. Marion Williams succeeded Lumpkin and served as principal from 1999 to 2005. Charlotte Wright was principal of Roosevelt High School from 2006 to 2012. Terrance Little was hired as principal in May 2012, but resigned in February 2013.

Roosevelt High School remains the first and only school built exclusively for the African-American community in the city of Gary. The building was added to the National Register of Historic Places on December 19, 2012.

Effective at the beginning of 2012–2013 school year, the Indiana Department of Education, under the authority of Public Law 221, took away control of Roosevelt High School from the Gary Community School Corporation due to substandard academic performance. The state board of education contracted with EdisonLearning, a Tennessee-based for-profit company, to operate the school for the next four school years. Edison renamed the school Theodore Roosevelt College & Career Academy. With the closure of Gary's Lew Wallace High School in 2015, Roosevelt is the only one of the seven William Butts Ittner-design schools in Gary that still remains in use.

Donna Henry served as principal from the fall of 2013 until the spring of 2018, and under her leadership, the school received its first A grade from the Indiana Department of Education. Ian Miller succeeded Donna Henry as principal beginning the fall of 2018, and shortly resigned in January 2019. The last principal of the legendary Roosevelt was Joshua T. Batchelor, who was named principal as of February, 2018. Mr. Batchelor is known for his leadership as the school transitioned from its 25th Avenue campus to its final site in the Gary Area Career Center, and for his efforts to keep the school open. In January 2020, the State Board of Education decided not to renew the innovation contract. EdisonLearning and Gary Community School engaged in negotiations to continue operating the school without the innovation contract; however, a mutual agreement was not met. As a result, EdisonLearning made the decision to not operate the school beyond June 30, 2020. Shortly after, Gary Community Schools announced that Theodore Roosevelt would be closing indefinitely, and students would be merged with West Side Leadership Academy.

== Design and construction ==
The school's present-day campus includes brick structures that were constructed in separate phases. Prior to the construction of the main high school building in 1930, an east building was constructed in 1923 and a west building was constructed in 1926. Additions to the school were made in 1946 and from 1968 to 1971.

Architect William Butts Ittner of Saint Louis, Missouri, designed the main, Colonial Revival-style high school facing Twenty-fifth Avenue. Construction on the red-brick building began in 1929 and was completed in 1930, although his U-shaped design was never fully constructed. Ittner's designs were followed in the addition to the school that was constructed in 1946. Later additions were simplified versions of Ittner's earlier plans, but similar in detail. The high school's landscaped grounds included playground equipment, a track, and a football field. Its most prominent feature is a brick entrance pavilion, which is centered in a projecting gable. The entryway features Doric pilasters and columns made of limestone. The entryway's second-story arched window rests on a main-level portico, which produces the appearance of a balcony. The main building is topped with a tall cupola, inspired by the one on Independence Hall in Philadelphia, Pennsylvania. The high school's original interior featured terrazzo flooring, as well as glazed ceramic block and plastered walls. It included classrooms, an auditorium, and a gymnasium, among other spaces. The new Roosevelt High School building was dedicated in April 1931.

== Notable alumni ==
- Charles Adkins - boxer known for winning Olympic gold medal at 1952 Helsinki Olympics in Light Welterweight (140 lb/63.5 kg) class
- Dick Barnett - basketball player for Los Angeles Lakers and New York Knicks, 2-time NBA champion, member of College Basketball Hall of Fame
- Avery Brooks - actor and musician
- Lee Calhoun - multiple Olympic gold medal winner of 110 m hurdles at 1956 and 1960 Summer Olympics
- Winston Garland (born 1964) - NBA player for Minnesota Timberwolves, Houston Rockets, Denver Nuggets, Los Angeles Clippers and Golden State Warriors
- Joe Gates - MLB player for Chicago White Sox
- Eugene German (born 1997), basketball player in the Israeli Basketball Premier League
- Gerald Irons - NFL player for Cleveland Browns and Oakland Raiders
- Jackie Jackson - member of The Jackson 5 and oldest brother to Michael Jackson
- Rebbie Jackson - singer; oldest sister of Michael Jackson
- Tito Jackson - singer, guitarist and original member of The Jackson 5 and The Jacksons; older brother of Michael Jackson
- Wallace Johnson - MLB player for San Francisco Giants and Montreal Expos
- Michael King - commentator, columnist and Emmy Award-winning television producer
- Leon Lynch - Vice president of the United Steelworkers
- William Marshall - actor, director, and opera singer
- Willie McCarter (1946–2023) - basketball player for Los Angeles Lakers, first-round pick in 1969 NBA draft
- Lloyd McClendon - manager of Detroit Tigers' Minor league affiliate team, the Toledo Mud Hens, former MLB manager of Seattle Mariners and Pittsburgh Pirates, former MLB player for Pirates, Chicago Cubs and Cincinnati Reds
- Glenn Robinson (born 1973) - NBA player for San Antonio Spurs, Philadelphia 76ers, Atlanta Hawks and Milwaukee Bucks
- Robert D. Rucker Indiana Supreme Court
- The Spaniels - music group
- Sharmell Sullivan-Huffman - retired professional wrestling valet and occasional professional wrestler, as well as the wife of current American professional wrestler, promoter, and color commentator Booker T
- George Taliaferro - All-American halfback at Indiana University; led Hoosier football program to their only undefeated Big Ten Conference championship in 1945, former NFL Pro Bowler for Baltimore Colts, Dallas Texans and New York Yanks.
- Geraldine Warrick-Crisman television executive

== See also ==
- List of high schools in Indiana
