= Cheryl Pruitt =

American educator (born 1963)

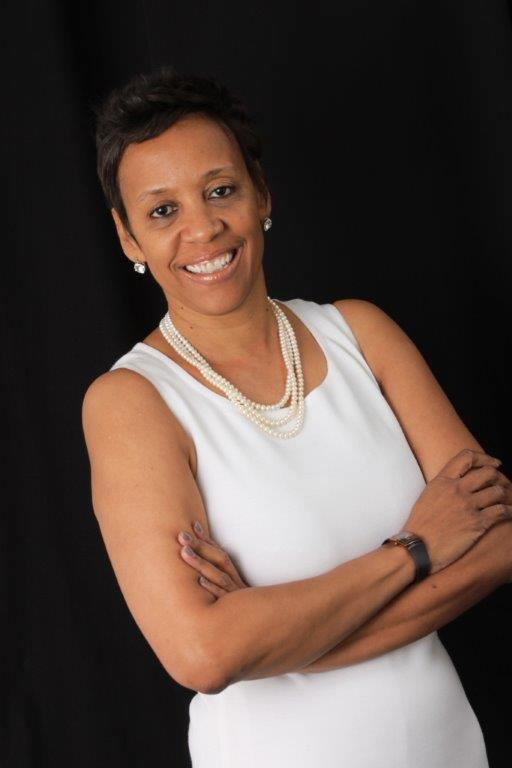
- Born: Cheryl Pruitt
- Occupation: Education Administrator

Cheryl Pruitt is an American educator, school administrator, and advocate for educational equity. She served as Superintendent of the Gary Community School Corporation in Gary, Indiana, from 2012 to 2018. During her tenure, she led one of Indiana's most financially challenged public school districts through academic reform, operational restructuring, and increasing state oversight. Her leadership attracted sustained coverage because of the district's financial restructuring, educational initiatives, and eventual state intervention.

== Early life and education ==
Pruitt was born in Gary, Indiana. She graduated from Rust College with a B.S., and the University of Memphis with a EdD. Prior to entering public education, she worked as a scientific researcher for substance abuse prevention and children's health. Before becoming superintendent, she served as a classroom teacher, instructional leader, and school administrator.

== Career ==
=== Superintendent of Gary Community School Corporation (2012-2018) ===
In June 2012, the Gary Community School Corporation appointed Pruitt superintendent, following a national search. District officials cited her experience in urban education, instructional leadership, and organizational improvement as key factors in her selection. Pruitt assumed leadership during a period of significant transition. The district faced declining enrollment, aging facilities, long-term financial deficits, and increasing pressure from state officials to address structural budget challenges. Her administration implemented academic, operational, and financial initiatives intended to stabilize the district while improving student achievement. These included expanding Early College and dual-credit opportunities, strengthening career and technical education, increasing partnerships with colleges and community organizations, promoting literacy initiatives, and implementing restorative approaches to student discipline. During Pruitt's tenure, district officials reported improvements in literacy performance and reductions in student dropout rates while continuing efforts to modernize instructional programs despite persistent financial pressures

==== State Oversight and District Restructuring ====
The district's financial challenges remained a central issue throughout Pruitt's administration. In 2015, Indiana lawmakers authorized the appointment of an independent financial manager to oversee the district's finances after decades of accumulated debt. In 2017, additional legislation created a state-appointed emergency management team with expanded authority over district operations, resulting in one of the only state takeovers of a public school system in the state of Indiana. The restructuring and proposed school consolidations received extensive coverage from regional media, including CBS Chicago, ABC7 Chicago, and the Post-Tribune. Pruitt announced her resignation in 2017, after nearly six years as superintendent.

==== Financial Reviews and Legal Proceedings ====
In 2017, the state-appointed emergency management team requested multiple financial audits of the school district. As part of the audits, Pruitt was asked to return a $30,000 bonus that was awarded in 2016, due to an audit by state officials that questioned the approval process by the school district's board of education. Pruitt voluntarily repaid the bonus. Following her departure, she was later charged with theft and official misconduct, relating to reimbursement expenses for a trip to an educational conference in 2016. In June 2020, the prosecutors dismissed all charges, concluding the legal proceedings.

== Later Career ==
After leaving the Gary Community School Corporation, Pruitt serves in executive leadership, nonprofit, and advisory roles focused on educational innovation, workforce development, and community development. Her work has emphasized educational opportunity, leadership development, and economic development. She has also served on civic and nonprofit boards dedicated to literacy and healthcare.

== Publications ==
Pruitt has written and contributed to publications addressing educational leadership, school governance, crisis management, and educational equity.

Notable work include:

Leadership Under Siege: Intersectionality, Crisis Management, and the Global Impact of State Takeovers in Education.

== See also ==
- Alternative Education
