= Ensweiler Academy =

Coordinates: 41.549461°N 87.412003°W

- Ensweiler Academy crest
- Gary, Indiana; United States

Information
- Type: Public Alternative school
- Established: 1995 (approximate)
- Principal: Martin Freeman
- Faculty: 6
- Enrollment: 90 (approximate)
- Website: Ensweiler Academy

Ensweiler Academy was a seven-year (6–12) alternative school of the Lake Ridge Schools Corporation in unincorporated Lake County, Indiana, United States. It won the Indiana Exemplary Award for alternative schools in Indiana twice (2001 and 2003). It accepted students from the Highland, Lake Ridge, Lake Central, and Whiting school districts. Students were referred from their home school. It closed at the end of the 2009–2010 school year.
