= WGVE-FM =

High school radio station in Gary, Indiana

Coordinates: 41.554°N 87.318°W

- Gary, Indiana; United States
- Broadcast area: Northwest Indiana
- Frequency: 88.7 MHz

Programming
- Format: High school radio

Ownership
- Owner: Gary Community School Corporation

History
- First air date: January 1954
- Former frequencies: 88.1 MHz (1954–63)
- Call sign meaning: "Gary's Voice of Education"

Technical information
- Licensing authority: FCC
- Facility ID: 23278
- Class: A
- ERP: 2,100 watts
- HAAT: 28 meters (92 ft)

Links
- Public license information: Public file; LMS

WGVE-FM is an FM high school radio station broadcasting on 88.7 MHz in Gary, Indiana. It is owned and operated by Gary Community School Corporation. The station airs local news, music, and limited NPR programming, as well as high school and college sporting events.

== History ==
WGVE-FM signed on in January 1954, and originally broadcast at 88.1 MHz. In 1963, its frequency was changed to 88.7 MHz. Originally located at Lew Wallace High School, it moved to its current location in the Gary Area Career Center in 1969.
