= Emerson High School =

Emerson High School or Emerson School may refer to:

- Eldorado Emerson Private School, Orange, California
- Emerson School for Visual and Performing Arts, Indiana, United States
- Emerson High School (Indiana), United States
- Emerson High School (Union City, New Jersey), United States
- Emerson Jr./Sr. High School, New Jersey, United States
- Emerson High School, McKinney, Texas, United States
- Emerson High School (Kirkland, Washington), United States
