= Wirt-Emerson Visual and Performing Arts High Ability Academy =

Public high school in Gary, Indiana, US

William A. Wirt/Emerson Visual and Performing Arts High Ability Academy
- Wirt-Emerson VPA HAA
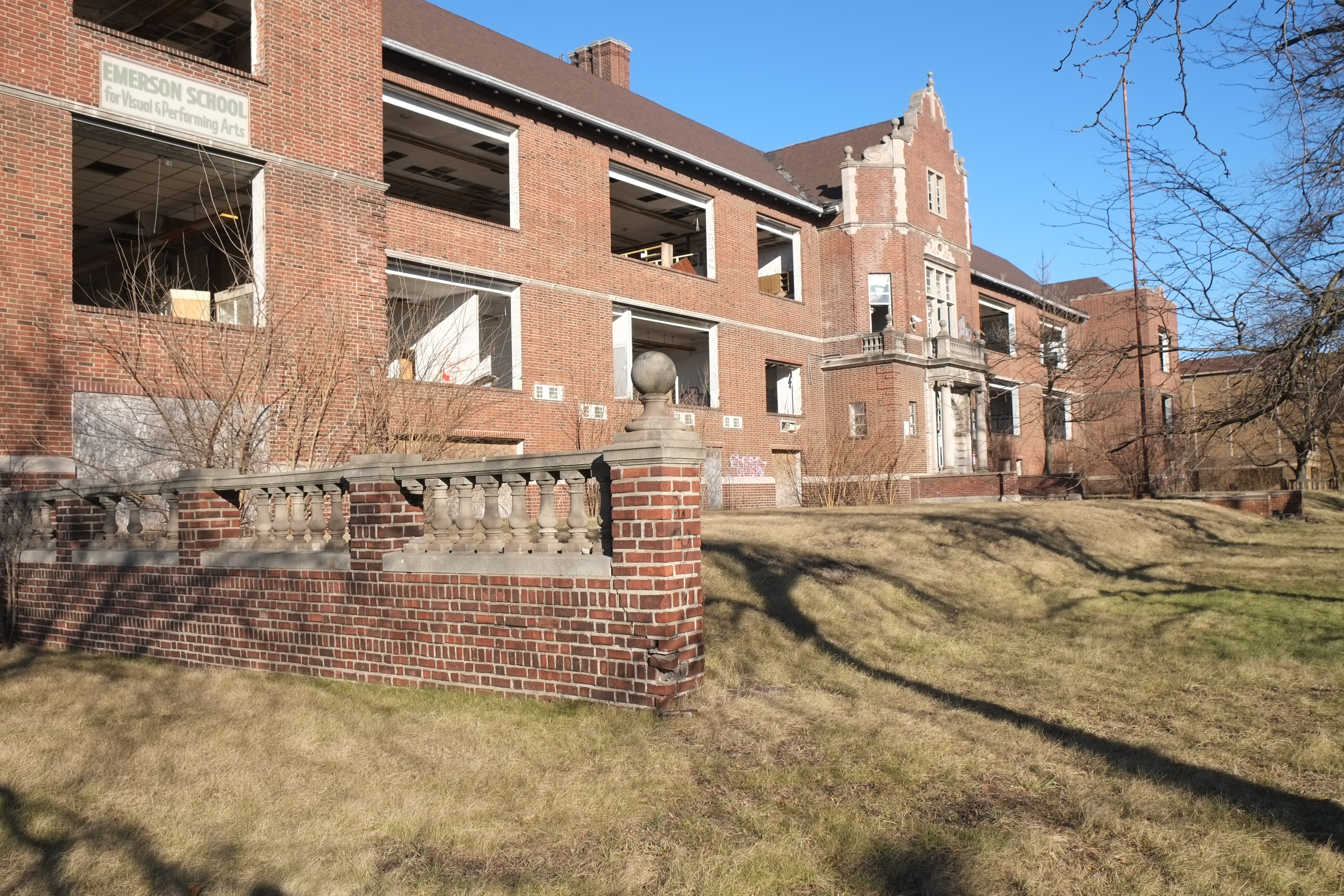
- Wirt-Emerson Visual and Performing Arts High Ability Academy after being abandoned, January 2019

Location
- 210 North Grand Boulevard; Gary, Lake County, Indiana 46403; United States
- Coordinates: 41.609959°N 87.262374°W

Information
- Type: Public high school
- Established: 1982
- School district: Gary Community School Corporation
- Principal: Mary O. Ward
- Faculty: 28.00 FTE
- Grades: 6-12
- Enrollment: 578 (2014-2015)
- Website: Official website

Wirt-Emerson Visual and Performing Arts High Ability Academy, was a seven-year (6–12) middle/high school for the visual and performing arts in the Gary Community School Corporation in Gary, Indiana. For reference to the historic closed facility that originally housed Emerson VPA, and previously Emerson High School, see Emerson High School (Indiana).

== History ==
Emerson High School closed in 1981 due to underpopulation. Emerson School for Visual and Performing Arts launched in 1982 after the closure of the high school. Emerson VPA was one of the first of its kind in the state of Indiana.

In 2008 the Emerson building was shuttered due to mold issues. The district moved its visual and performing arts program first to the former Kennedy King Middle School, and in 2010 into the former William A. Wirt High School building in Gary's scenic Miller Beach community.

In 2009, the district renamed the school "Wirt-Emerson Visual and Performing Arts High Ability Academy." Its location was 210 N. Grand Avenue.

On February 16, 2018, Emergency Manager Peggy Hinckley told the state Distressed Unit Appeals Board (DUAB) that she would shutter Wirt-Emerson to help reduce a $1.5 million monthly shortfall in the district that has a total of $115 million in accumulated debt, in addition to the monthly deficit. On March 2, 2018, the DUAB agreed with the Emergency Manager's decision to shutter the 79-year-old school which is one of the anchors of the Miller neighborhood of Gary. The closing left the West Side Leadership Academy—located over 5 miles to the west of Wirt-Emerson at 9th Ave & Gerry St—as the lone traditional public high school option for about 225 Wirt-Emerson students.
