= Gary Area Career Center =

- Gary Area Career Center crest

Location
- 1800 East 35th Avenue; Gary, Indiana; United States; 41.555571°N 87.315026°W

Information
- Type: Public
- Established: 1968
- Director: Michelle Meadows
- Faculty: 20 (approximate)
- Enrollment: 100 (approximate)
- Website: Official Site

The Gary Area Career Center is a career and technical education (CTE) school governed by the Gary Community School Corporation in Gary, Indiana, United States. The school opened in 1968 and was originally called the Gary Area Technical-Vocational School. Course offerings include classes focused on agriculture, aviation, automotive technology, criminal justice, health sciences, and radio and television production. WGVE-FM, an educational radio station, broadcasts from the school and is part of broadcast media training classes.
