= Leon Lynch =

American trade union leader

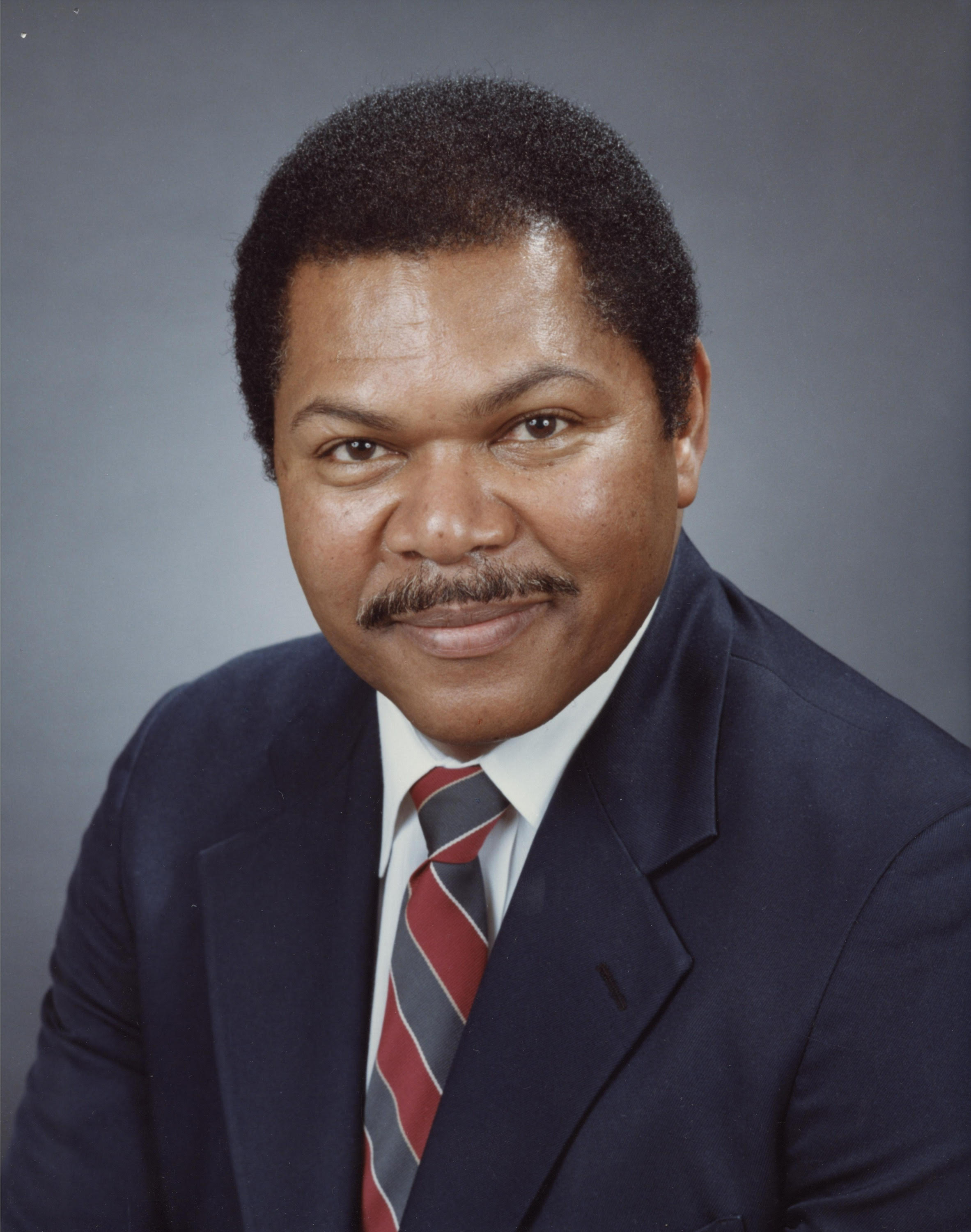
Leon Lynch in 1990

Leon Lynch (June 4, 1935 - May 4, 2012) was an American trade union leader. He was the first African American to be an international vice president of any major labor union, serving in that role for the United Steelworkers from 1976 to 2006. He was elected to the Executive Council of the AFL-CIO in 1995 and served on that body until he retired in 2008. He was co-chair of the A. Philip Randolph Institute and a member of the Democratic National Committee.

== Early life and education ==
Lynch was born in Edwards, Mississippi, in 1935 to Herman Lynch, a mill worker, and Ethel Marie (née Lyles) Lynch, a restaurant cook, dry cleaning and domestic worker. When he was a boy, the family of eight migrated to Gary, Indiana, where he attended public school, graduating from Theodore Roosevelt High School.

== Early career ==
In 1956, Lynch began working as a pipe mill loader in the Youngstown Sheet & Tube steel mill in East Chicago, Indiana, where he joined the United Steelworkers of America (USWA) - Local 1011. The former USWA is now known as the United Steelworkers or USW. He soon became a union activist, serving as a grievance representative, member on several of the local union’s committees, and as president of the credit union. In 1968, he was hired by the union as a full-time staff representative. After Dr. Martin Luther King, Jr., was assassinated, he was sent to Memphis, Tennessee, to organize the African American workers there.

== Union career ==
In Memphis his first assignment was to work with Local 7655, which represented employees of the Carrier air conditioning plant. Although the wounds Memphis suffered following Dr. King’s 1968 assassination were still fresh, he quickly worked to conciliate black and white workers. His success led to the Carrier workers hanging a sign in front of their first meeting facility designating it as “Leon Lynch Union Hall.”

During their 1976 convention, the Steelworkers created the position of Vice President for Human Affairs and he was appointed to the new role, which oversaw the union’s civil rights and human rights initiatives. Former union president David J. McDonald was opposed to creation of the new position, but was powerless at that time.

In this new role, he chaired the Steelworkers’ Container Industry Conference, where he handled contract negotiations, and the Public Employees Conference. He was the first African American to serve as an international officer of any major union, and was described as part of the "top leadership" of the union. Subsequently, he was elected and re-elected for six consecutive four-year terms until he retired from the USW in 2006.

During his lengthy tenure, Lynch acted as a bridge between the union movement and the civil rights movement, serving as national chairman of the A. Philip Randolph Institute, an executive committee member of the Leadership Conference on Civil Rights, and a leader in the U.S. struggle against South African apartheid. At his request, his friend, Coretta Scott King, persuaded her father-in-law, the Rev. Martin Luther King, Sr., to speak at an organizing rally at Newport News, Virginia. The community responded by filling a stadium.

== Other roles ==
Lynch was elected to the AFL-CIO Executive Council in 1995, serving on committees that included Civil and Human Rights, Immigration, Legislative/Public Policy, and Safety and Occupational Health. Active in many political and human rights organizations, he was a member of the executive committee of the Democratic National Committee, president of the Workers Defense League, a board member of the National Endowment for Democracy, and a member of the Labor Roundtable of the National Black Caucus of State Legislators.

In 1994, President Bill Clinton appointed him to the Advisory Council on Unemployment Compensation. In 2000, he was appointed by President Clinton to the Air Traffic Service Board of the Federal Aviation Administration.

In 2005, USW Local 1011 in East Chicago, where Lynch began his career and union membership, dedicated the Leon Lynch Learning Center. The facility supports steelworkers by providing them with updated skills and training to prepare them for opportunities in today’s changing job market.

== Personal life and death ==
Lynch married Estella Wheeler Smith in 1956. Although their more than 29-year marriage ended, they remained close friends, having raised three daughters together. Mr. Lynch also had a fourth daughter as a result of a long term relationship. In 1998, he married Doris Tindal. In 2006, upon retirement from the USW, he and his wife moved to Bullhead City, Arizona. A few years later, he also purchased a home in Collierville, Tennessee, near one of his adult children and youngest grandchild. Lynch died on May 4, 2012, of cancer in Memphis, Tennessee. His wife, daughters and seven grandchildren survived him.
