= List of schools in Gary =

This article is a list of schools in Gary, Indiana (USA).

== Public schools ==
Most of Gary is served by the Gary Community School Corporation.

Some portions are served by the Lake Ridge Schools Corporation.

Some Gary residents in the outskirts attend schools administered by the River Forest Community School Corporation; River Forest does not operate any schools in Gary.

There are also two Head Start Schools operated independently funded by the government.

=== Head Start ===
- La Casa Head Start, Inc
- Geminus Head Start XXI

== Charter schools ==
- 21st Century Charter School of Gary
- Charter School of the Dunes
- Gary Lighthouse Charter School
- KIPP: Lead College Prep Charter School
- Thea Bowman Leadership Academy
- West Gary Lighthouse Charter School
- Aspire Charter School Academy

== Private schools ==
- Acts Christian Academy
- Abundant Life Tabernacle Day Care And School
- Ambassador Academy
- Ascension Lutheran Christian School
- Black Oak School for the Deaf
- Christ Baptist Christian Academy
- Christian Academy Ministry
- M C Bennett Holiness School
- New Shiloh Baptist School
- SDA Mizpah Church School
- Spirit Of God Accelerated Education
- Tender Loving Care Academy
- Treasure's Child Development Center

== Adult education ==
=== Schools ===
- Lake Ridge Schools Adult Education
- API Flight School

=== Colleges and universities ===
- Ivy Tech Community College Northwest
- Indiana University Northwest
- Lovells Barber College
