= William A. Wirt High School =

American public school in Gary, Indiana (1939–2009)

Coordinates: 41.609959°N 87.262374°W

William A Wirt Senior High School
- William A Wirt Senior High School crest
- 210 North Grand Boulevard; Gary, Indiana; United States

Information
- Type: Public
- Established: 1939
- Closed: 2009
- Colors: Cardinal & White
- Team name: Troopers
- Website: Official Site

William A Wirt Senior High School was a four-year (9–12) public high school of the Gary Community School Corporation in Gary, Indiana. In May 2009 the school announced that after over 70 years it would be closing. Starting in 2011, the site was used for the Wirt Emerson VPA Academy, a magnet school for the visual and performing arts, but that closed in 2018. The school building is currently unoccupied.

== Staff ==
The faculty included nearly 50 teachers.

== History ==
Wirt High School was established in 1939; it was named after Dr. William Albert Wirt, who served as the first superintendent of the Gary Schools from 1907 to early 1938. Former MLB player Ron Kittle is an alumnus of Wirt. Multi-instrumentalist and vocalist Crystal Taliefero is also an alumna of Wirt.

Wirt High School was closed in 2009 due to Gary Community School Corporation budget cuts.

The school had three shooting incidents which occurred on March 3, 1989, September 15, 2004, and June 6, 2006.
