= Michael P. Mahoney =

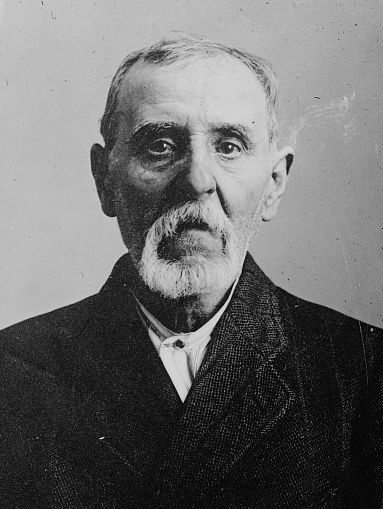
- Mahoney booking photo from 1914
- Born: March 17, 1842; York, Ireland
- Died: April 10, 1925 (aged 83); New York City, United States
- Status: Incarcerated and died in prison
- Criminal charge: Assassination attempt of Mayor John Purroy Mitchel

Michael P. Mahoney (March 17, 1842 – April 10, 1925) was a Irish-born American man who attempted to assassinate New York City Mayor John Purroy Mitchel on April 17, 1914.

== Biography ==
He was born March 17, 1842, in York, Ireland. He migrated to the United States in 1865, at the age of 23. He lived in Cincinnati and by 1914 had migrated to New York City.

At 1:30 pm on April 17, 1914, the 71-year-old Mahoney fired his gun at Mitchel as he entered his car to go to lunch. The bullet missed and hit Frank Lyon Polk, New York City's corporation counsel in the chin. Mitchel had been armed with a handgun. His predecessor, Mayor William Jay Gaynor, had been shot by a disgruntled former city employee in 1910.

In 1914, Mahoney was incarcerated in the Matteawan State Hospital for the Criminally Insane, where he died in 1925.
