= Alice Barrows =

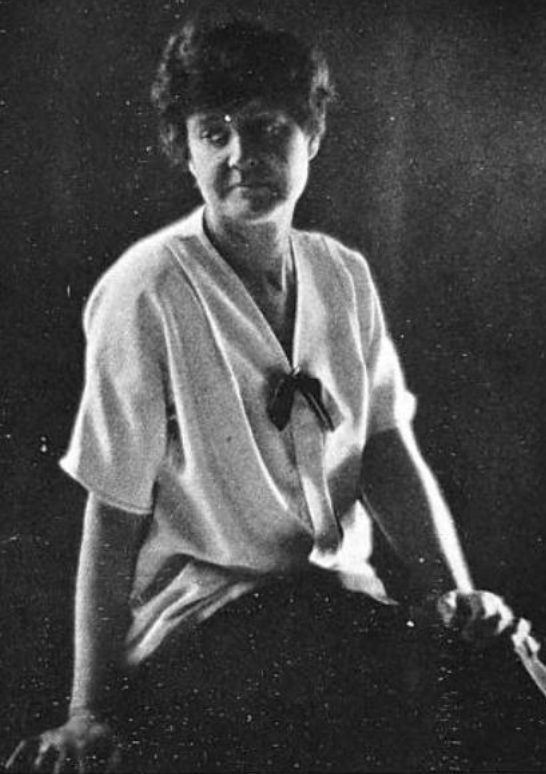
- Barrows, from a 1928 publication
- Born: November 15, 1878; Lowell, Massachusetts, U.S.
- Died: October 2, 1954 (aged 75)

Alice Prentice Barrows (November 15, 1878 – October 2, 1954) was a secretary of Dr. William A. Wirt, who headed the U.S. Office of Education in the early days of the New Deal of President Franklin Roosevelt. Barrows had been a member of the Communist party since 1919, the same year she began working for the Office of Education. During World War II Barrows was the executive secretary of the National Council of American-Soviet Friendship.

== Biography ==
Born in Lowell, Massachusetts, the daughter of Charles Dana Barrows and Marion Merrill, Alice graduated from Vassar College with an A.B. During 1901–03, she was employed as an English teacher at the Packer Collegiate Institute, then she taught English at the Ethical School in New York City from 1903–04. She became an English teacher at her alma mater until 1908 and was a graduate fellow of Columbia University. In 1909, Alice became a social investigator for the Russell Sage Foundation, mentored by Mary van Kleeck, who was later director of the Department of Industrial Studies. Together they completed a report of women in the millinery industry. Two years later in 1911, she was named director of the Vocational Education Survey. She was described as a "specialist in school buildings" in a 1928 profile.

In 1934, a Congressional Investigation was held to examine statements Dr. Wirt made regarding a meeting in Alice Barrows' home a year earlier. The "Wirt Incident" was widely reported and provoked much controversy. Barrows and several other government employees revealed to Wirt they were members of the Communist party. Wirt testified,

I was told they believe that by thwarting our then evident economic recovery, they would be able to prolong the country's destitution until they had demonstrated to the American people that the Government must operate business and commerce. By propaganda, they would destroy institutions making long term capital loans—and then push Uncle Sam into making these loans. Once Uncle Sam becomes our financier, he must also follow his money with control and management.

Wirt further testified they told him,

We believe we have Roosevelt in the middle of a swift stream, and that the current is so strong, that he cannot turn back or escape from it. We believe that we can keep Mr. Roosevelt there until we are ready to supplant him with a Stalin. We all think that Mr. Roosevelt is only the Kerensky of this revolution. We are on the inside. We can control the avenues of influence. We can make the President believe that he is making decisions for himself.^{1}

A June 1945 Venona project decryption of the Washington, D.C. KGB Office to Moscow's Eighth Department, the political intelligence wing, relayed information on matters regarding President Truman and Attorney General Francis Biddle. KGB agent Charles Kramer, who served on the staff of several Senate Subcommittees, and Barrows are the sources of the information. Mary van Kleeck who headed the Russell Sage Foundation and also served on the Board of the National Council, visited Washington weekly to meet with Barrows and Nathan Gregory Silvermaster.^{2}

The organization Barrows served as Director was found in 1953 to be a Communist front organization by the Subversive Activities Control Board (SACB). In its Findings of Fact, the SACB said the National Council of American-Soviet Friendship,

advances positions...markedly pro-Soviet and...anti-United States Government...is a Communist-action organization which has as its primary purpose to advance the objectives of the world Communist movement under the hegemony of the Soviet Union; it has the policy to support and defend the Soviet Union under any and all circumstances...We conclude that the National Council of American-Soviet Friendship, Inc., is substantially directed, dominated, and controlled by the Communist Party of the United States...and is primarily operated for the purpose of giving aid and support to...the Soviet Union, a Communist foreign government.^{3}

== Bibliography ==
- How women learn the millinery trade
- The dangers and possibilities of vocational guidance
- An interpretation of vocational guidance
- The preliminary report of the Vocational Guidance Survey

== Note ==
- ^{1} Hearings, House Select Committee To Investigate Certain Statements of Dr. William Wirt, 73rd Congress, 2nd Session, April 10 and 17, 1934.
- ^{2}*John Earl Haynes and Harvey Klehr, Venona: Decoding Soviet Espionage in America (New Haven: Yale University Press, 1999).
- ^{3} United States. Subversive Activities Control Board. Reports of the Subversive Activities Control Board. Washington. United States Government Printing Office. 1966. Vol. 1, p. 501.
