= Gary Plan =

Methodology for public school systems

The Gary Plan was a new method of building a highly efficient public school system that was much discussed in the Progressive Era in the 1910s and 1920s. It was in part inspired by the educational ideas of philosopher John Dewey. It was designed by School Superintendent William Wirt in 1907 and implemented in the newly built steel mill city of Gary, Indiana. Reformers tried to copy it across the country. Wirt later promoted it in New York City. However, there it was strongly opposed by unions and the Jewish community and was reversed in after 1917. In 1930 the census counted 25.7 million students in public schools. In 1929 variations of the Gary Plan were in use in 1068 schools in 202 cities with 730,000 students. (In 1930 the census counted 26 million students in all public schools.) Proponents claimed it both saved money and enhanced the learning experience. Ronald Cohen states that the Gary Plan was popular because it merged together Progressive commitments to:

paedagogical and economic efficiency, growth and centralization of administration, an expanded curriculum, introduction of measurement and testing, greater public use of school facilities, a child-centered approach, and heightened concern about using the schools to properly socialize children.

== Wirt establishes the Gary Plan ==
John Dewey, an academic philosopher of education, inspired Wirt when Wirt was a graduate student at the University of Chicago. In turn Dewey and his disciples praised the Gary Plan. In 1907, Wirt became superintendent of schools in the newly planned city of Gary, Indiana, which was built by U.S. Steel corporation. Wirt began implementing his educational values in the local schools. He initiated teacher hiring standards, designed school buildings, lengthened the school day, and organized the schools according to his ideals. The core of the schools' organization in Gary centered upon the platoon or work-study-play system and Americanizing the 63.4 percent of children with parents who were immigrants. The theory behind the Gary Plan was to accommodate children's shorter attention spans, and that long hours of quiet in the classroom were not tenable.

Above the primary grades, students were divided into two platoons—one platoon used the academic classrooms (which were deemphasized), while the second platoon was divided between the shops, nature studies, auditorium, gymnasium, and outdoor facilities split between girls and boys. Students spent only half of their school time in a conventional classroom. "Girls learned cooking, sewing, and bookkeeping while the boys learning metalwork, cabinetry, woodworking, painting, printing, shoemaking, and plumbing." In the Gary plan, all of the school equipment remained in use during the entire school day; Rather than opening up new schools for the overwhelming population of students, it was hoped that the "Gary Plan would save the city money by utilizing all rooms in existing schools by rotating children through classrooms, auditoriums, playgrounds, and gymnasiums."

== Gary Plan in New York City ==
The platoon system gained acceptance in Gary and received national attention during the early decades of the twentieth century. In 1914, New York City hired Wirt as a part-time consultant to introduce the work-study-play He became a consultant on a one-week-a-month basis at a fee of $10,000 a year. Mayor John Purroy Mitchel had visited Gary and was an enthusiastic advocate as the city worked to restructure schools buildings and schedules. In the following three years, however, the Gary system encountered resistance from students, parents, and labor leaders concerned that the plan simply trained children to work in factories and the fact that Gary's Plan was in predominantly Jewish areas. In part because of backing from the Rockefeller family, the plan became heavily identified with the interest of big business. "In January 1916, the Board of Education released a report finding students attending Gary Plan schools performed worse than those in 'non-Garyized schools'." This opposition was a major factor in the defeat of New York Mayor Mitchel in his bid for reelection in 1917.
