= John B. Johnston =

American politician

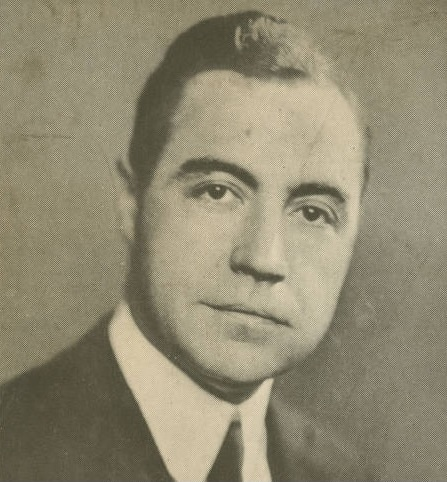

Member of the U.S. House of Representatives from New York's 5th district
- In office March 4, 1919 – March 3, 1921
- Preceded by: James P. Maher
- Succeeded by: Ardolph Loges Kline

Personal details
- Born: John Brown Johnston; July 10, 1882 Glasgow, Scotland
- Died: January 11, 1960 (aged 77) Brooklyn, New York, U.S.
- Resting place: Green-Wood Cemetery, Brooklyn
- Citizenship: United States
- Party: Democratic Party
- Education: New York Law School
- Profession: Attorney; politician; judge

John Brown Johnston (July 10, 1882 – January 11, 1960) was a Scottish-American lawyer, jurist and Democratic politician who served one term as a United States representative from New York from 1919 to 1921.

== Biography ==
Born in Glasgow, Scotland, on July 10, 1882, Johnston immigrated to the United States in 1886 with his parents who settled in Brooklyn, New York. He attended the public schools in Long Island City and Brooklyn and the New York Law School. He was admitted to the bar and commenced the practice of law in Brooklyn.

== Career ==
Elected as a Democrat to the Sixty-sixth Congress for New York's fifth district, Johnston served as United States Representative from March 4, 1919 to March 3, 1921. He was not a candidate for renomination, and resumed the practice of his profession in New York City.

Johnston was a delegate to the Democratic National Conventions in 1920 and 1924.

=== Judge ===
Elected a justice of the Appellate Division of the New York Supreme Court for the second district, he assumed his duties on January 1, 1928, and on January 1, 1935, was designated an associate justice of the appellate division and served until his retirement on December 31, 1952. On January 1, 1953, he was appointed an official referee of the supreme court and continued until July 4, 1955. He then assumed the office of State Administrator of the Judicial Conference of the State of New York until his death.

== Death ==
Johnston died in Brooklyn, New York on January 11, 1960 (age 77 years, 185 days). He is interred at Green-Wood Cemetery, Brooklyn, New York.

U.S. House of Representatives
Preceded by James P. Maher	Member of the U.S. House of Representatives from New York's 5th congressional district March 4, 1919 – March 4, 1921	Succeeded by Ardolph Loges Kline
