= Martin Luther King Jr. Academy =

Public high school in Gary, Indiana, US

Location
- 1800 E 35th Ave; Gary, Lake County, Indiana 46409; United States; 41.555636°N 87.314845°W

Information
- Type: Public
- Established: 1970
- Closed: 2018
- School district: Gary Community School Corporation
- Faculty: 20 (approximate)
- Grades: 9–12
- Enrollment: 125 (approximate)
- Website: Official Site

Martin Luther King Jr. Academy was a four-year (9–12) alternative high school of the Gary Community School Corporation in Gary, Indiana, United States. It closed in 2018.

== History ==
Martin Luther King Jr. Academy opened in 1970 as "Second Chance High School" to educate dropouts and at-risk students. In November of that year, it was renamed by a petition of the student body in honor of civil rights movement leader Martin Luther King Jr., who was assassinated in 1968.

The school was originally located in a storefront on Broadway in Gary's Midtown neighborhood, but later moved to 711 Chase in Ambridge Mann.

== See also ==
- List of high schools in Indiana
