= William Wirt (educator) =

American educationalist

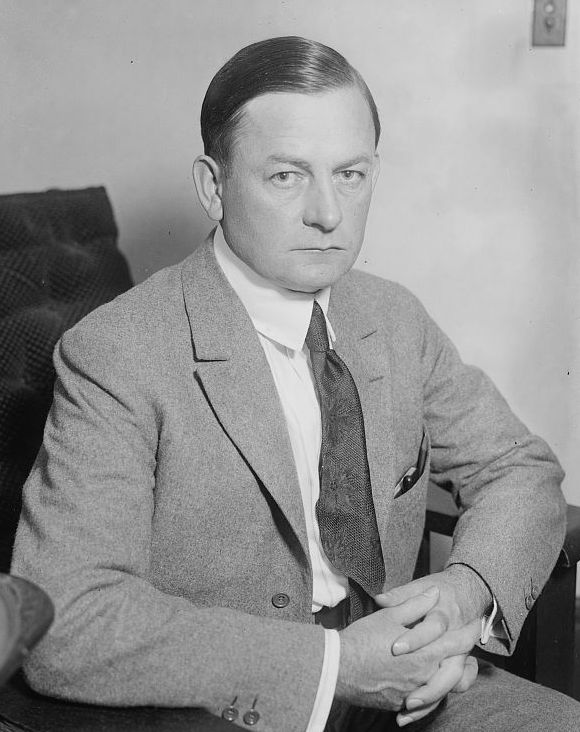
- Born: William Albert Wirt; January 21, 1874; Markle, Indiana
- Died: 11 March 1938 (aged 64); Gary, Indiana, U.S.
- Education: The University of Chicago; DePauw University
- Occupation: Superintendent

William Albert Wirt (January 21, 1874 – March 11, 1938) was a superintendent of schools in Gary, Indiana. Wirt developed the Gary Plan for the more efficient use of school facilities, a reform of the Progressive Movement that was widely adopted in over 200 cities by 1929.

Wirt was born in Markis, Indiana. He graduated from DePauw University and did postgraduate work at the University of Chicago. He taught high school mathematics in small towns in Indiana and was superintendent in Blufton Indiana, 1899–1907. His new methods at Blufton gained national attention and he then became superintendent in Gary.

== Gary Plan ==
In 1907, Wirt became superintendent of schools in Gary and began implementing his educational values in the local schools. He initiated teacher hiring standards, designed school buildings, lengthened the school day, and organized the schools according to his ideals. The core of the schools' organization in Gary centered upon the platoon or work-study-play system and Americanizing the 63.4 percent of children with parents who were immigrants. The theory behind the Gary Plan was to accommodate children's shorter attention spans, and that long hours of quiet in the classroom were not tenable.

Above the primary grades, students were divided into two platoons—one platoon used the academic classrooms (which were deemphasized), while the second platoon was divided between the shops, nature studies, auditorium, gymnasium, and outdoor facilities split between girls and boys. Students spent only half of their school time in a conventional classroom. "Girls learned cooking, sewing, and bookkeeping while the boys learning metalwork, cabinetry, woodworking, painting, printing, shoemaking, and plumbing." In the Gary plan, all of the school equipment remained in use during the entire school day; Rather than opening up new schools for the overwhelming population of students, it was hoped that the "Gary Plan would save the city money by utilizing all rooms in existing schools by rotating children through classrooms, auditoriums, playgrounds, and gymnasiums."

The platoon system gained acceptance in Gary and received national attention during the early decades of the twentieth century. In 1914, New York City hired Wirt as a part-time consultant to introduce the work-study-play system in the public schools. He became a consultant on a one-week-a-month basis at a fee of $10,000 a year. In the following three years, however, the Gary system encountered resistance from students, parents, and labor leaders concerned that the plan focused on training children for factory labor, to the neglect of upward mobility, and was being implemented in predominantly Jewish areas. In part because of backing from the Rockefeller family, the plan became heavily identified with the interest of big business. "In January 1916, the Board of Education released a report finding students attending Gary Plan schools performed worse than those in 'non-Garyuzed schools' ." This opposition was a major factor in the defeat of New York Mayor John Purroy Mitchel in his bid for reelection in 1917. Ronald Cohen said the Gary Plan was popular because it merged Progressive commitments to:

paedagogical and economic efficiency, growth and centralization of administration, an expanded curriculum, introduction of measurement and testing, greater public use of school facilities, a child-centered approach, and heightened concern about using the schools to properly socialize children.

== Attack against the New Deal programs ==
In addition to these concerns, William Wirt launched an attack upon Franklin D. Roosevelt's New Deal agenda, charging that the New Deal threatened American individualism by attempting government planning of the economy. He wrote pamphlets, articles, and addresses on the economy, particularly regarding the manipulation of the dollar to solve the economic crisis. Finally, Wirt accused the New Deal of being infiltrated by communists designing the collapse of the American system. His ideas appeared in his pamphlet America Must Lose by a “Planned Economy,” the Stepping-Stone to a Regimented State (1934).

The pamphlet made him the target of a libel suit.

== See also ==
- Wirt High School, established in Gary, Indiana in 1939, named after Wirt
- Alice Barrows
