= Ardolph L. Kline =

American politician (1858–1930)

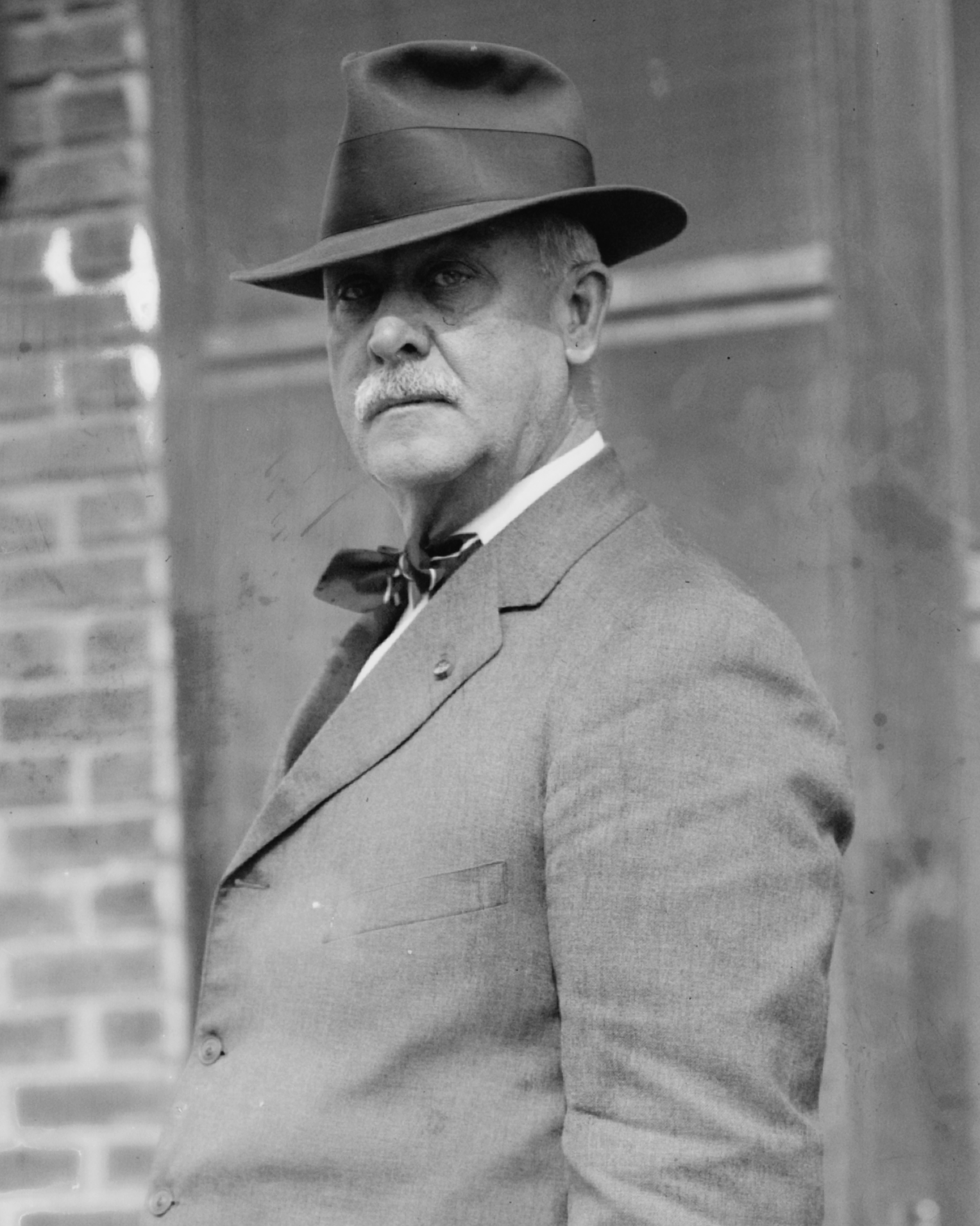
- Kline circa 1914

Member of the U.S. House of Representatives from New York's 5th district
- In office March 4, 1921 – March 3, 1923
- Preceded by: John B. Johnston
- Succeeded by: Loring M. Black, Jr.

Acting Mayor of New York City
- In office September 10, 1913 – December 31, 1913
- Preceded by: William Jay Gaynor
- Succeeded by: John Purroy Mitchel

4th President of the New York City Board of Aldermen
- In office June 9, 1913 – December 31, 1913
- Preceded by: John Purroy Mitchel
- Succeeded by: George McAneny

Vice-Chairman of the New York City Board of Aldermen
- In office 1912–1912

Member of the New York City Board of Aldermen from the 51st district
- In office January 1, 1904 – December 31, 1907
- In office January 1, 1912 – January 6, 1914

Personal details
- Born: Ardolph Loges Kline; February 21, 1858 Newton, New Jersey, U.S.
- Died: October 13, 1930 (aged 72) New York City, New York, U.S.
- Party: Republican
- Spouse: Frances A. Phalon (m. November 25, 1886)
- Education: Phillips Academy, Andover, Massachusetts
- Profession: merchant, military officer, government official

Ardolph Loges Kline (February 21, 1858 – October 13, 1930) was an American politician and New York National Guard officer who became acting mayor of New York City on September 10, 1913, upon the death of Mayor William Jay Gaynor, serving for the rest of the year. He was later a United States representative from Brooklyn (1921–1923).

== Biography ==
Kline was born near Newton, New Jersey, in 1858 and studied at Phillips Academy in Andover, Massachusetts, but did not attend college. In 1876 and 1877, he started working for a men's clothing company in New York City and joined the New York National Guard as a private. When the Spanish–American War of 1898 began, he was named a Lieutenant-Colonel, and in 1901 a Brevet (honorary or acting) Brigadier-General.

=== Political career ===
After losing a campaign for Sheriff of Kings County (Brooklyn), Kline was elected as an Alderman for the 51st District in Brooklyn in 1903 and 1905, but lost re-election in 1907 due to Democratic redrawing of his district. He won back his seat in 1911 and became vice-chairman of the Board of Aldermen in 1912, promising to enforce all rules fairly from the chair (including those against smoking).

When John P. Mitchel, the elected President of the Board of Aldermen, resigned in 1912 in order to become Collector of the Port of New York, Kline succeeded Mitchel. And when Mayor Gaynor (who had never fully recovered from an attempted assassination in 1910) died at sea in September 1913, Board President Kline became mayor.

He served out the remainder of Gaynor's term, leaving office on December 31, 1913. Despite his stated intention of keeping all the department heads appointed by his predecessor for the rest of his term, Kline, in his very last days of office, dismissed Rhinelander Waldo as Commissioner of Police rather than accept a New Year's Eve resignation.

Although re-elected as alderman for his old district for the 1914–1915 term, Kline resigned in early January 1914 to begin four years as the city's Tax Commissioner for Brooklyn (reviewing appeals of property tax assessments).

He later served as a Republican U.S. Representative from New York (5th District in Brooklyn) from 1921 to 1923, being named to the House Committee on Naval Affairs, but lost re-election in 1922 to Loring M. Black, Jr. (Democratic, 1923–1935). Kline spent all of his post-Congressional life as New York manager of the sea-service bureau of the United States Shipping Board.

Kline died October 13, 1930, at the Methodist Episcopal Hospital in Brooklyn, New York, and was buried in Holy Cross Cemetery.

== Legacy ==
He is still (in early 2016) the only mayor of the consolidated (post-1897) city never to have won a citywide popular election to any office (such as those from which Joseph V. McKee and Vincent Impellitteri rose to become acting mayor). On the other hand, Kline is also the last serving or former mayor to win election to any other public office.

== Congressional election returns ==
Here are the election returns from the Fifth Congressional District in Brooklyn for 1920–1922, as reported by William Tyler Page, the Clerk of the United States House of Representatives. The sitting Democratic Representative, John B. Johnston (1919–21), did not seek re-election in 1920.

- (1920 was a landslide election year for the Republicans under President Warren G. Harding, but in the statewide elections of 1922, without such a national race, the New York City Democrats Al Smith and Royal Copeland easily unseated Republican Governor Nathan L. Miller and Republican U.S. Senator William M. Calder.)

year	candidate	party	vote	percent
1920	Ardolph L. Kline	Republican	42,129	58.2%
1920	Edward Cassin	Democratic	27,650	38.2%
1920	Israel M. Chatcuff	Socialist	2,047	2.8%
1920	William M. Nichol	Prohibition	574	0.8%
1920	TOTAL		72,400	
1922	Ardolph L. Kline	Republican	25,917	42.1%
1922	Loring M. Black, Jr.	Democratic	33,840	54.9%
1922	Louis Weil	Socialist & Farmer-Labor	1,412	2.3%
1922	William M. Nichol	Prohibition	428	0.7%
1922	TOTAL		61,597	

Political offices
Preceded by William Jay Gaynor	Mayor of New York City (acting); September 10, 1913 – December 31, 1913	Succeeded by John Purroy Mitchel
U.S. House of Representatives
Preceded by John B. Johnston	Member of the U.S. House of Representatives from New York's 5th congressional district March 4, 1921 – March 3, 1923	Succeeded by Loring M. Black, Jr.
