= John Purroy Mitchel =

American politician (1879–1918)

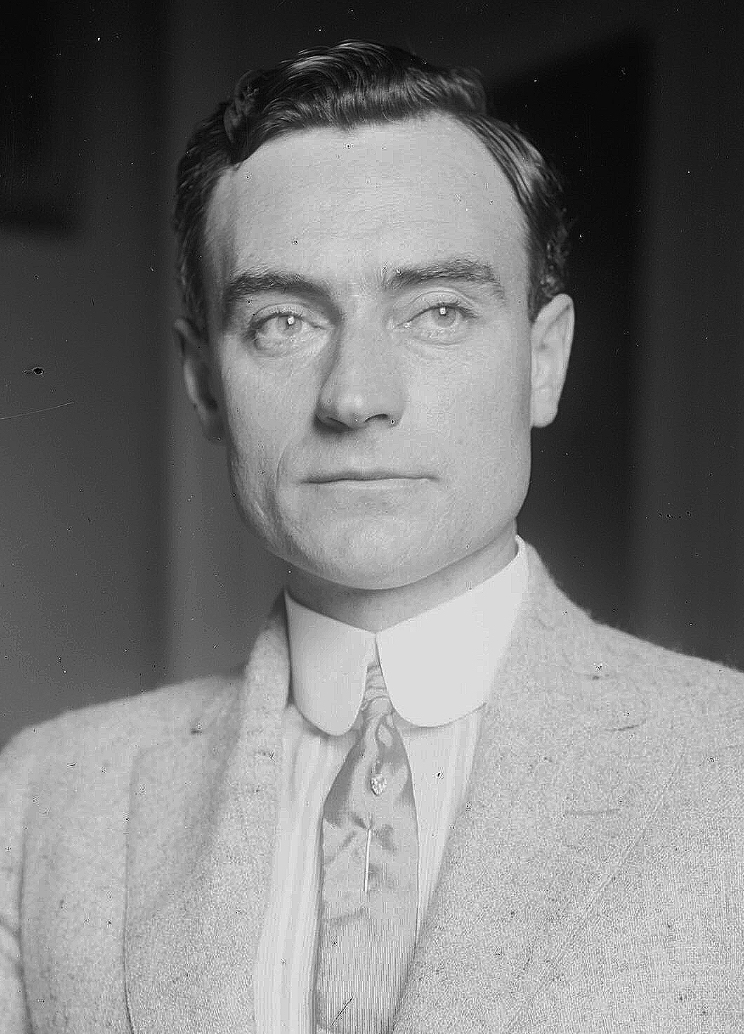

96th Mayor of New York City
- In office January 1, 1914 – December 31, 1917
- Preceded by: Ardolph Loges Kline (acting)
- Succeeded by: John Francis Hylan

34th Collector of the Port of New York
- In office June 7, 1913 – December 31, 1913
- Appointed by: Woodrow Wilson
- Preceded by: William Loeb Jr.
- Succeeded by: Dudley Field Malone

3rd President of the New York City Board of Aldermen
- In office January 1, 1910 – June 7, 1913
- Preceded by: Patrick F. McGowan
- Succeeded by: Ardolph L. Kline

Personal details
- Born: July 19, 1879 New York City, U.S.
- Died: July 6, 1918 (aged 38) Lake Charles, Louisiana, U.S.
- Resting place: Woodlawn Cemetery
- Party: Republican
- Spouse: Olive Child (m. 1909)
- Parent(s): James Mitchel; Mary Purroy
- Education: Columbia University; New York Law School
- Occupation: Attorney

John Purroy Mitchel (July 19, 1879 – July 6, 1918) was the 96th mayor of New York City, serving from 1914 to 1917. Elected at 34, he was the third-youngest mayor of the city, and was sometimes referred to as the "Boy Mayor of New York". Mitchel won the 1913 mayoral election in a landslide, but lost the Republican primary in 1917 and came in second place in the general election as an Independent. He is remembered for his short career as leader of anti-Tammany Hall reform politics in New York, as well as for his early death as an Army Air Service officer during a training flight in Louisiana amid World War I.

Mitchel was praised by reformists in New York. Journalist Oswald Garrison Villard, the editor of The Nation, called him "the ablest and best Mayor New York ever had." Former President Theodore Roosevelt, endorsing Mitchel's re-election bid in 1917, stated that he had "given us as nearly an ideal administration of the New York City government as I have seen in my lifetime." However, he is generally held to have been ineffective as a politician.

Mitchel's later staunchly Roman Catholic New York family had been founded by his paternal grandfather and namesake, John Mitchel, an Ulster Presbyterian Young Irelander who became a renowned writer and leader in the Irish nationalist movement, as well as a staunch supporter of the Confederacy.

== Early life ==
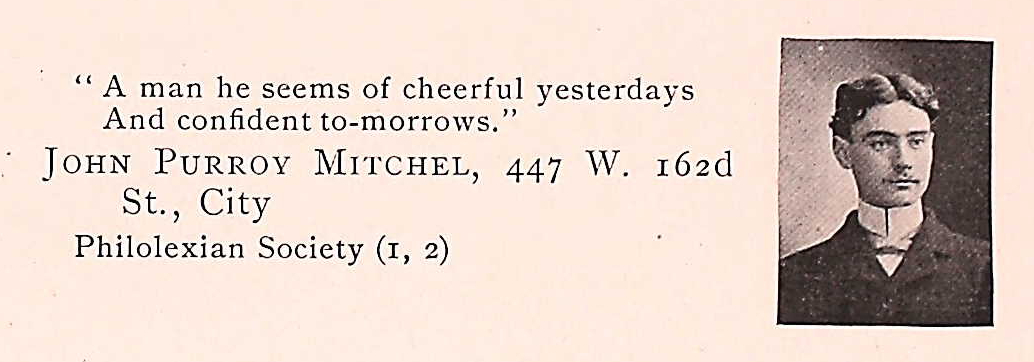
Mitchel in the Columbia University yearbook, 1899

John Purroy Mitchel was born on July 19, 1879, in Fordham, the Bronx, to James Mitchel, a New York City fire marshal, and Mary Purroy, who worked as a schoolteacher until her marriage. James had served in the Confederate States Army, as did two of his brothers, who died in action during the American Civil War. James was a Presbyterian Irish-American, the son of Irish nationalist writer John Mitchel and his Irish wife, the former Jane Verner.

John's maternal grandfather, Venezuelan-born Juan Bautista Purroy, was that country's consul in New York, which made Mitchel the first Mayor of New York City of Hispanic descent. Mitchel's great-grandfather, José Joaquin de Purroy, was a lawyer from Spain who settled in Venezuela. His maternal grandmother, Catherine Dillon, was Irish by birth. The Purroy family also included leading politicians in the Bronx.

John graduated from Fordham Preparatory School in the late 1890s, obtaining a bachelor's degree from Columbia College in 1899 where he was a member of the Philolexian Society, and graduating from New York Law School in 1902 with honors. Mitchel then pursued a career as a private attorney.

== Early career ==
In December 1906, Mitchel was hired by family friend and New York City corporation counsel William B. Ellison to investigate the office of John F. Ahearn, borough president of Manhattan, leading to Ahearn's dismissal. Mitchel began his career as assistant corporation counsel and then became a member of the Commissioners of Accounts, from which he investigated city departments. Mitchel gained results and recognition for his thorough and professional investigations into various city departments and high-ranking officials. Mitchel, with the help of Henry Bruere and other staff members of the Bureau of Municipal Research turned the insignificant Commissioners of Accounts into an administration of importance.

The young Mitchel's reputation as a reformer earned him the support of anti-Tammany Hall forces in local politics. In 1909, Mitchel was elected president of the Board of Aldermen. As president of the board of aldermen, Mitchel was able to enact fiscal reforms, cutting waste and improving accounting practices. He unsuccessfully fought for a municipally owned transit system, and voted against allowing the Interborough Rapid Transit and Brooklyn Rapid Transit companies permission to extend their existing subway and elevated lines. Mitchel served as acting mayor for six weeks in 1910, after incumbent William Jay Gaynor was shot. His biggest accomplishment during his short tenure was the act of neutrality during a garment industry strike.

== Political career ==
=== Mayoral campaign ===
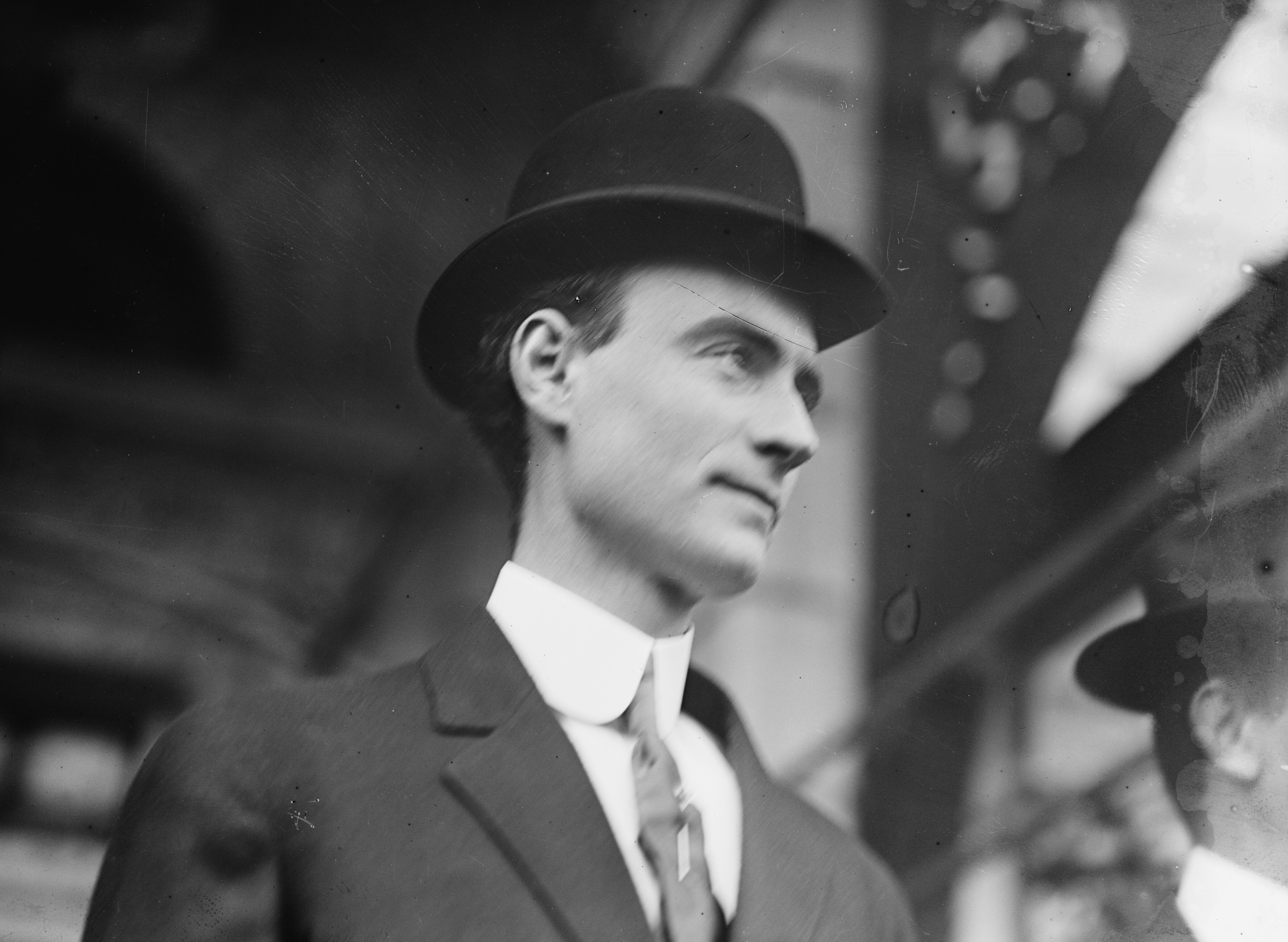
Mitchel, undated

As the 1913 mayoral election approached, the Citizens Municipal Committee of 107 set out to find a candidate that would give New York "a non-partisan, efficient and progressive government." They were assisted in this endeavor by the Fusion Executive Committee, led by Joseph M. Price of the City Club of New York. After nine ballots, Mitchel was nominated as a candidate for mayor. During his campaign, Mitchel focused on modernizing and fighting corruption in the city government.

At the age of 34, Mitchel was elected mayor on the Republican Party slate in a landslide. He defeated Democratic candidate Edward E. McCall by 121,000 votes, thus becoming the second youngest mayor of New York City; he was often referred to as the "Boy Mayor of New York."

=== Tenure as mayor ===
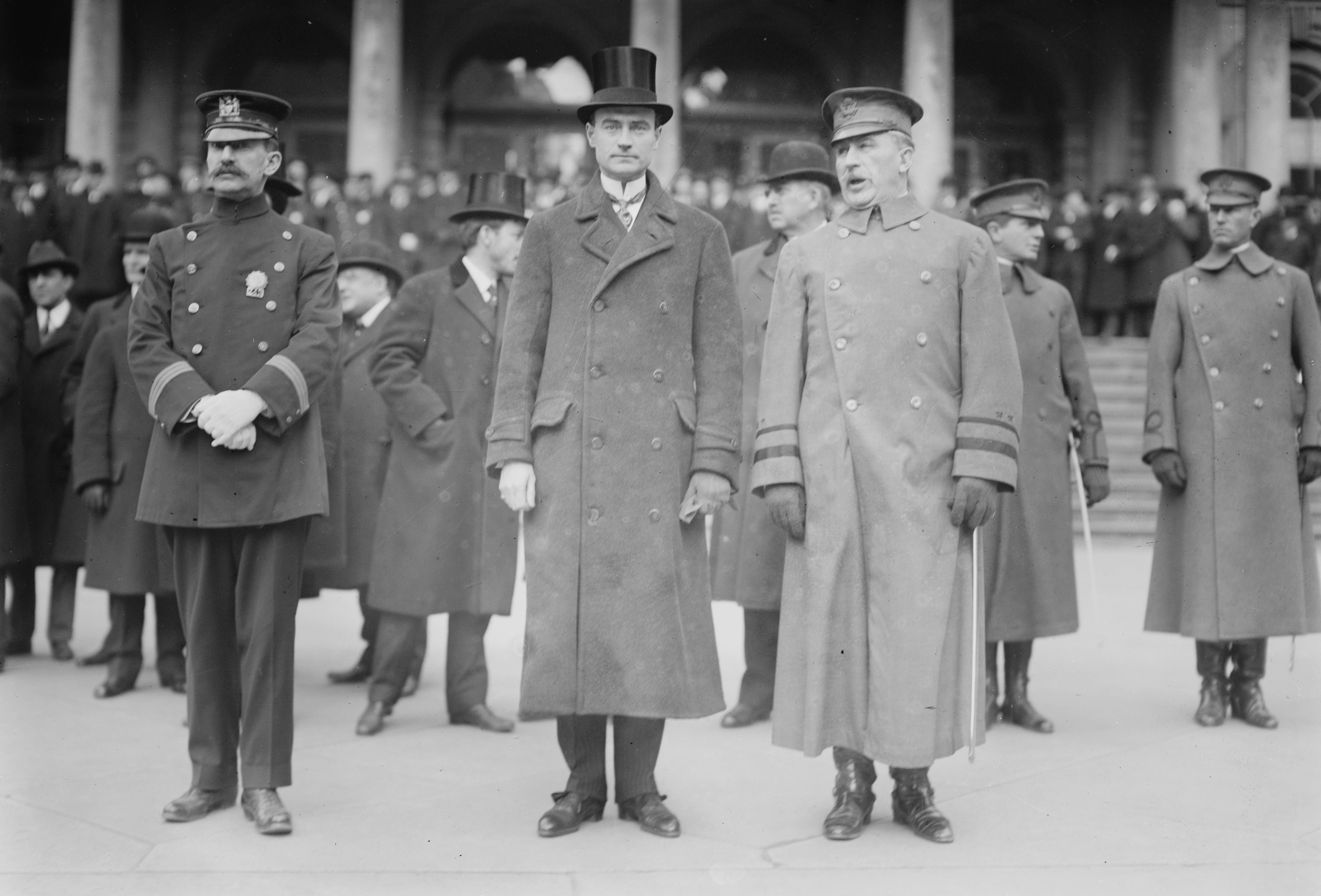
Mitchel and Leonard Wood review the 30th New York Volunteer Infantry Regiment, January 20, 1915

Mitchel's administration introduced widespread reforms, particularly in the New York City Police Department as overseen by Police Commissioner Arthur Woods. Woods fought corruption in the department and increased its efficiency and scope in attacking crime. His administration was neutral during garment and transportation worker's strikes in 1916.

At 1:30 P.M., on April 17, 1914, Michael P. Mahoney fired a gun at Mitchel as the mayor was getting in his car. The bullet missed and hit Frank Lyon Polk, New York City's corporation counsel, in the chin.

Mitchel's early popularity was soon diminished due to his fiscal policies and vision of education. Mitchel was heavily criticized for combining vocational and academic courses in the Gary Plan, and he began to trim the size of the Board of Education and attempted to control teachers' salaries. While Mitchel was a Catholic, he alienated that voting bloc by his investigation into corruption in Catholic charities.

Mitchel advocated for universal military training to prepare for war. In a speech at Princeton University on March 1, 1917, he described universal military training as "the [only] truly democratic solution to the problem of preparedness on land." These positions alienated New Yorkers, who felt he focused on military patriotism over politics.

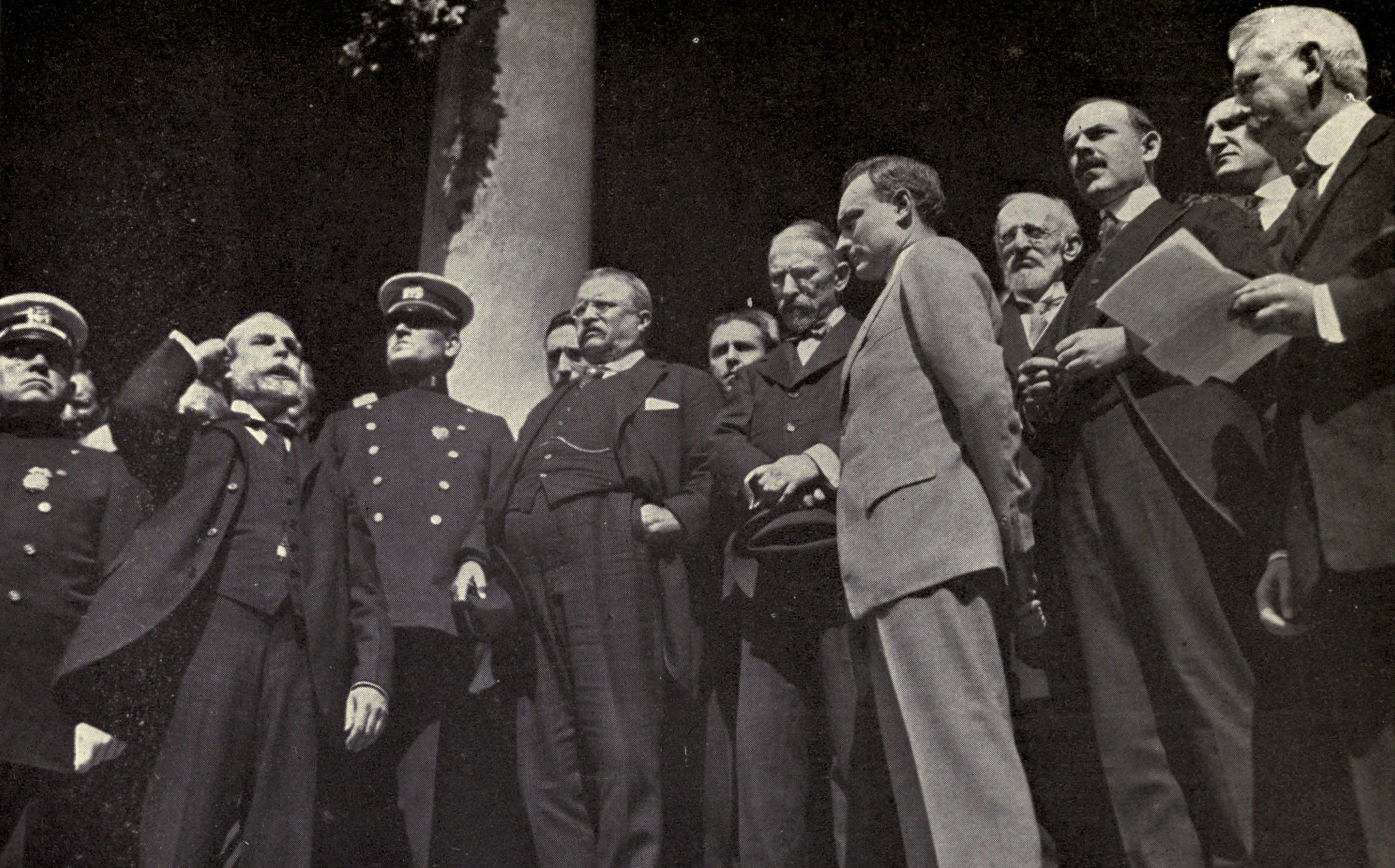
Charles Evans Hughes, Theodore Roosevelt, Henry Morgenthau, Oscar Straus, and other distinguished citizens pledge their support to Mayor Mitchel on the steps of New York City Hall, October 1, 1917

Mitchel ran again for mayor in the highly charged wartime election of 1917. His reelection campaign suffered, as many New Yorkers felt he cared more about American involvement in World War I, socializing with the city's elite, and fiscal management than local issues. He narrowly lost the Republican primary to William M. Bennett after a contentious recount, but then ran for re-election as a pro-war Fusion candidate.

Mitchel's campaign focused on wartime patriotism, with a media campaign that denounced Germans, Irish, and Jews as unpatriotic sympathizers with the enemy cause. Mitchel faced Bennett, anti-war Socialist Morris Hillquit, and Tammany Hall Democrat John F. Hylan in the general election; Hylan, whose campaign was sharply critical of Mitchel, won in a landslide without taking a clear position on the war, while Mitchel barely finished in second place ahead of Hillquit.

== Death ==
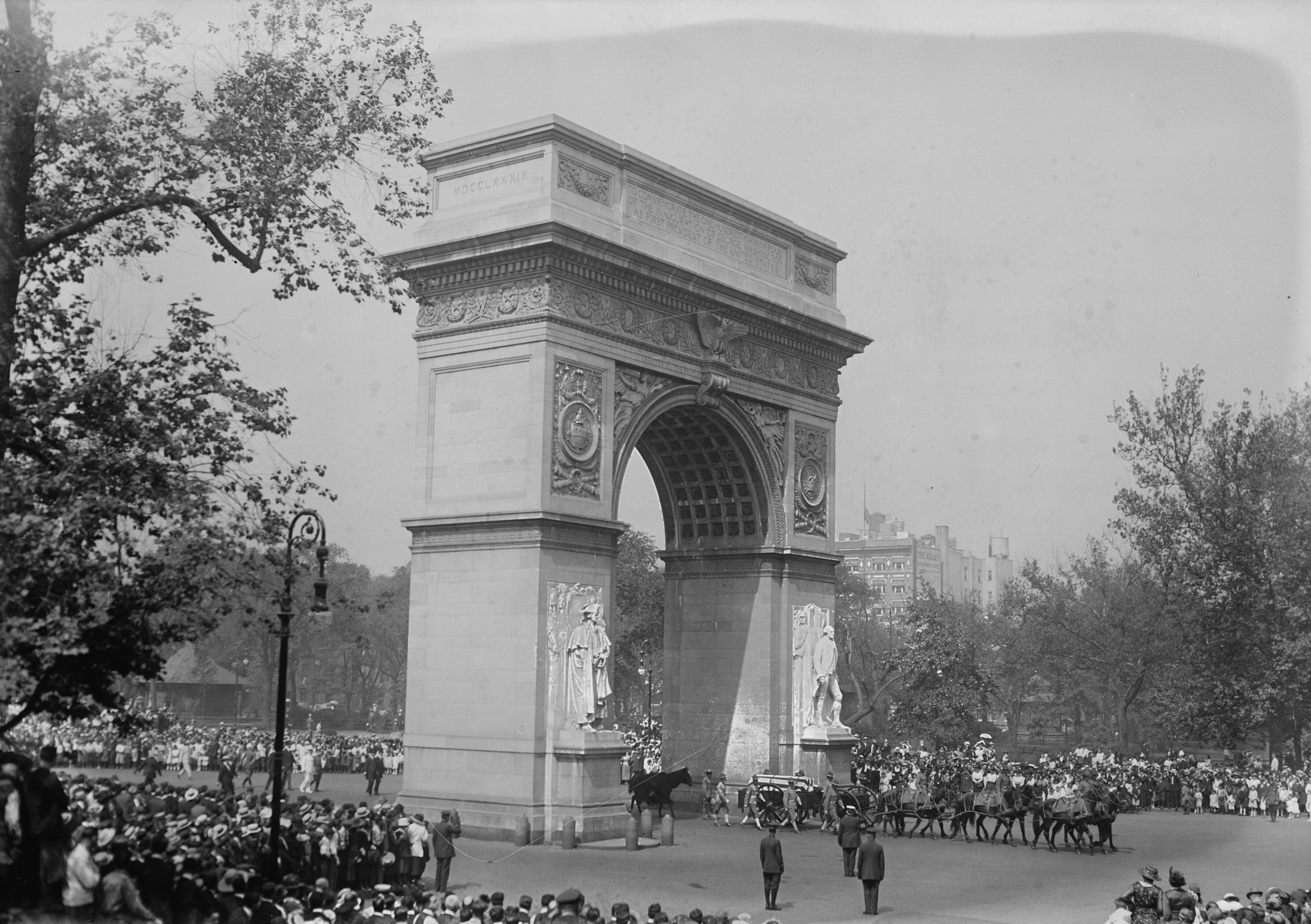
Mitchel's casket passes under the Washington Square Arch during his funeral, July 11, 1918

After losing re-election, Mitchel joined the Army Air Service as a flying cadet, completing training in San Diego and obtaining the rank of major. On the morning of July 6, 1918, while returning from a short military training flight to Gerstner Field near Lake Charles, Louisiana, his plane suddenly went into a nosedive, causing him to fall from his plane due to an unfastened seatbelt. Mitchel plummeted 500 feet (150 m) to his death, his body landing in a marsh about 0.5 miles (0.80 km) south of the field.

This shocking event seems to have an inspired a scene in F. Scott Fitzgerald's 1922 novel, The Beautiful and Damned, in which the plane of Gloria's former Ivy League flame falls "fifteen hundred feet at Mineola a piece of a gasolene engine smashed through his heart."

Mitchel's body was returned to New York City. His funeral was held at Saint Patrick's Cathedral in Manhattan, and he was buried in Woodlawn Cemetery in the Bronx on July 11, 1918.

== Legacy ==
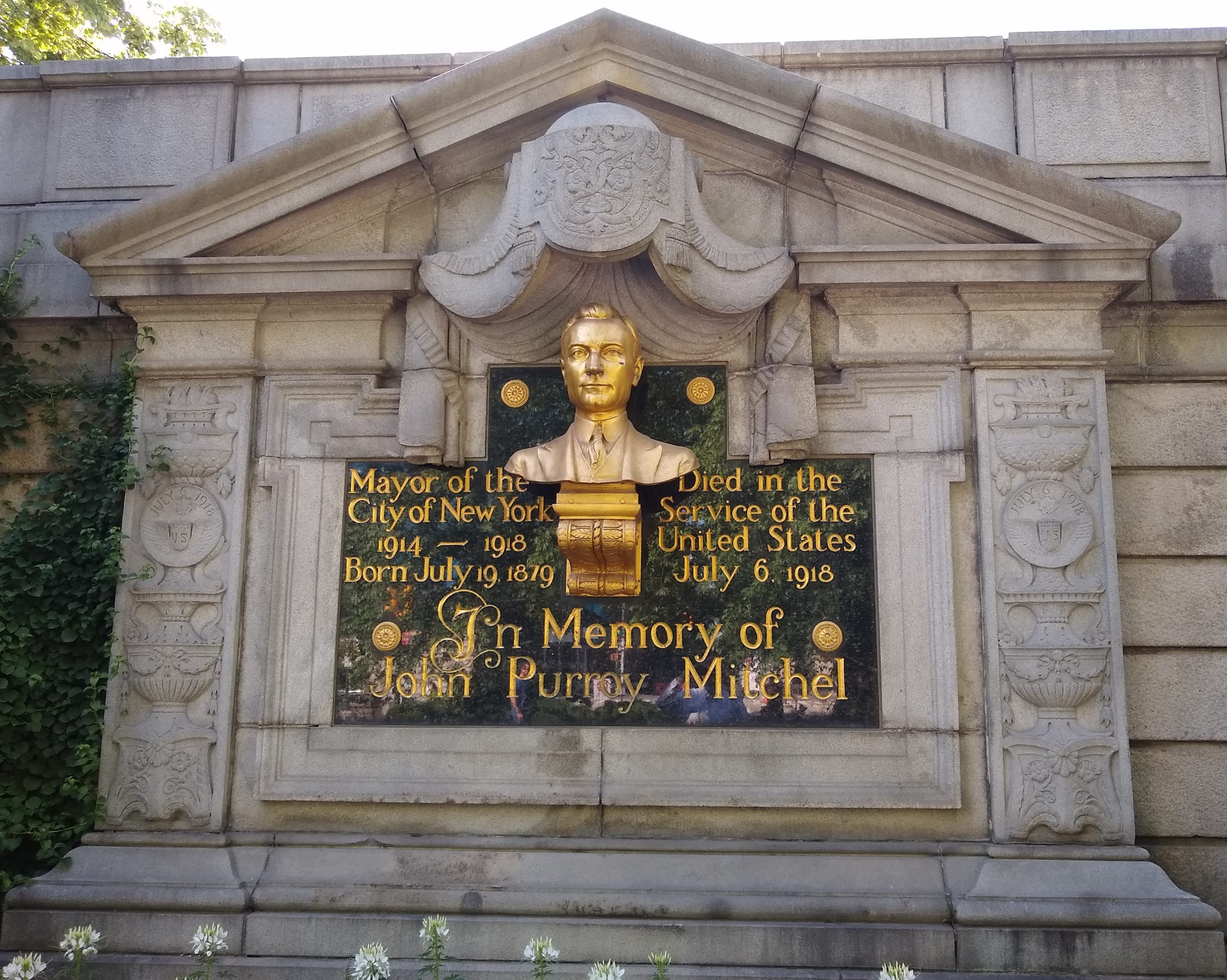
John Purroy Mitchel Monument at Central Park in New York City

Historian Mark D. Hirsch has said of Mitchel's tenure as mayor:

He was one of the ablest mayors in the judgments of many and provided an outstanding administration, but was exasperatingly guilty of every blunder that could be attributed to youthful stubbornness, unnecessary asperity, and poor judgment both by himself and his advisers.

A 1993 survey of historians, political scientists and urban experts, conducted by Melvin G. Holli of the University of Illinois Chicago, ranked Mitchel as the seventeenth-worst American big-city mayor to have served since 1820.

Mitchel Air Force Base on Long Island was named for him in 1918. A bronze memorial plaque with Mitchel's likeness is affixed between the two stone pylons at the western end of Hamilton Hall at Columbia University. A plaque of his likeness is located on an entrance to the base of the Jacqueline Kennedy Onassis Reservoir jogging track in Central Park.

The Fire Department of New York operated a fireboat named John Purroy Mitchel from 1921 to 1966.

American singer-songwriter Joanna Newsom's 2015 song "Sapokanikan" references Mitchel and the circumstances of his death.

== See also ==
- Mitchel Square Park
- William Brown Meloney (1878–1925), author of an unpublished manuscript on Mitchel's life
- List of mayors of New York City

== Footnotes ==
Political offices
Preceded by Ardolph Loges Kline	Mayor of New York City; 1914—1917	Succeeded by John F. Hylan
