= Emerson High School (Indiana) =

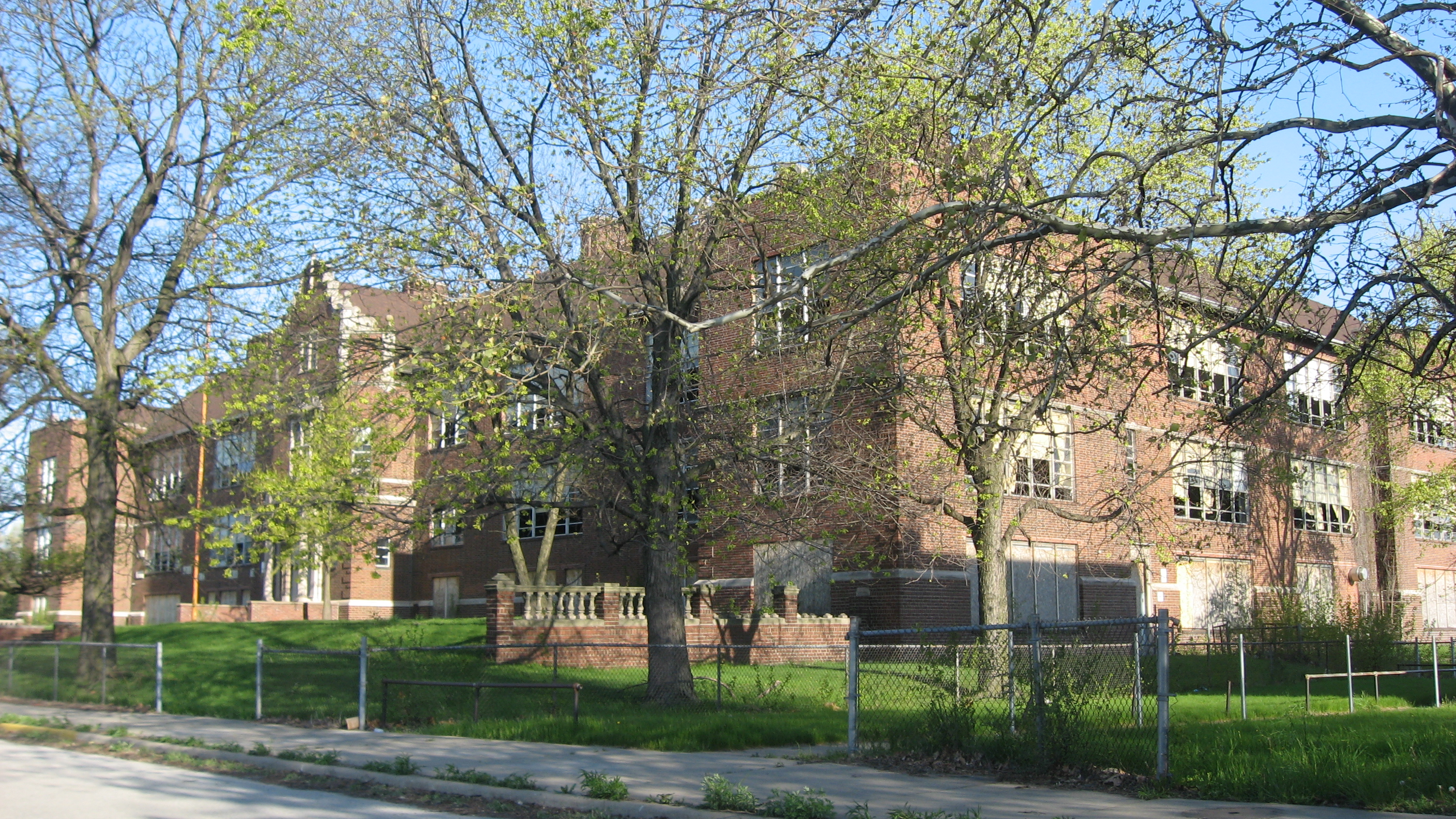
- Front and eastern side of the school

Location
- 716 E. 7th Avenue; Gary, Indiana; United States; 41°35′57″N 87°19′39″W

Information
- Other name: Ralph Waldo Emerson School
- Type: Public high school
- Established: 1909
- School district: Gary Community School Corporation
- Grades: 9–12
- Colors: Silver and Gold
- Mascot: Tornados
- Nickname: Tornados
- Ralph Waldo Emerson School
- U.S. National Register of Historic Places
- Built: 1908
- Built by: E.C. Gerhard
- Architect: William B. Ittner
- Architectural style: Tudor Revival, Jacobethian Revival
- NRHP reference No.: 95000702
- Added to NRHP: June 9, 1995

Emerson High School was a public high school of the Gary Community School Corporation, located in a historic facility in Gary, Indiana, United States.

In 1981, Emerson closed as a high school. For approximately 17 years, the facility housed a performing arts magnet program, which has since relocated and is still in operation. The original Emerson High School facility closed in 2008 due to lack of funds and building dilapidation, including mold.

== History ==
Gary School Superintendent William Wirt used the Ralph Waldo Emerson School to be the first to use his new Work-Study-Play system of education, a "Whole Child" philosophy. This philosophy drew international attention to Emerson.

The building opened in 1909 and included an auditorium, gymnasium, pool, and even a zoo. St. Louis architect William Ittner designed the school. There were over seven laboratories, separate band and orchestra rooms, art studios, and rooms for industrial and household arts. Athletic facilities, advanced for their time, included an indoor swimming pool, and an upstairs running track.

In 1927, eighteen African American students were transferred from the Virginia Street School to Emerson due to overcrowding, and this decision precipitated the Emerson School Strike on September 26. By the end of the strike, about three-fourths of the students were boycotting. On September 30, people at a city council meeting made the decision to segregate the school again, eventually leading to the construction of another all-Black high school, Roosevelt High School.

The facility closure was due to Gary Community School Corporation budget cuts and to severe mold issues.

The building is on the National Register of Historic Places, but as of 2015, has been heavily vandalized.
