= Edward Everett McCall =

Justice of the Supreme Court of New York (1863-1924)

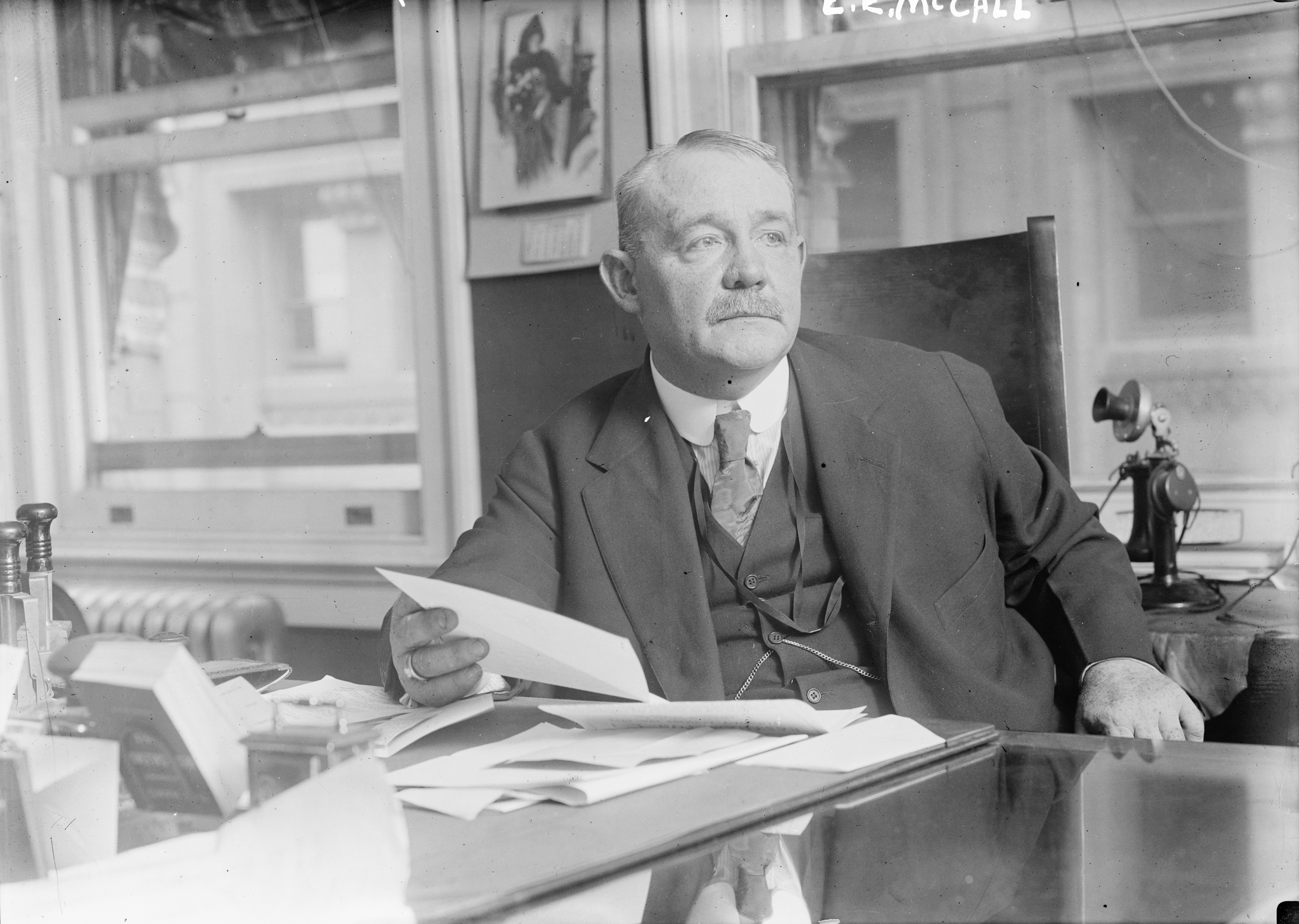

Edward Everett McCall (January 6, 1863 – March 12, 1924) was a Justice of the Supreme Court of New York from 1902 to 1913 and was also the Chairman of the New York Public Service Commission from 1913 to 1915.

In November, 1915, he was removed from that office by Governor Charles S. Whitman because McCall owned stock in a company under his jurisdiction. He ran unsuccessfully as the Democratic Party candidate for the Mayor of New York City in 1913.

He died of pneumonia on March 12, 1924 in New York City.
