= Thea Bowman Leadership Academy =

- Thea Bowman Leadership Academy logo

Location
- 3401 West 5th Avenue; Gary, Indiana 46402; United States
- 41°35′58″N 87°20′58″W

Information
- Type: Charter
- Established: August 18, 2003
- Superintendent: Marlon Mitchell
- Principal: Daniel Sprouse
- Faculty: 80
- Teaching staff: 48.00 (FTE)
- Grades: K-12
- Enrollment: 849 (2023-24)
- Student to teacher ratio: 17.69
- Color
- Athletics conference: Independent
- Team name: Eagles
- Rival: Gary West Side High School
- Affiliations: Chicago Illinois American Quality Schools
- Website: Official Site

Thea Bowman Leadership Academy is a K-12 charter school in Gary, Indiana. It was established by the Drexel Foundation for Educational Excellence, Inc., and is managed by American Quality Schools, Inc.

The school is named after Sr Thea Bowman, an African-American Catholic nun, teacher, and scholar in the 20th century.

== History ==
Thea Bowman Leadership Academy first opened as a K-6 charter school on August 18, 2003. With each passing year, Bowman Academy added an additional grade level. As of the 2009–2010 academic year, the school had expanded its program to accommodate all thirteen grade levels, from kindergarten through 12th grade. Students who entered the program as 6th graders in August 2003 comprised the school's first class of graduating high school seniors in June 2010.

The K-6 Thea Bowman Leadership Academy occupies the building that once housed Holy Angels School, a Catholic school associated with the adjacent Cathedral of the Holy Angels, which is the seat of the Diocese of Gary. The current building opened in 1966 as Holy Angels School, and was renamed in 1994 as Sister Thea Bowman School, but was ultimately closed in 2002. The current school is in no way affiliated with the cathedral or the diocese.

In 2008, Bowman Academy began construction on a new building to accommodate students in grades 7 through 12. The new Thea Bowman Leadership Academy High School was dedicated on April 23, 2009, and was fully operational for the 2009–2010 academic year.

The school has undergone several administrative changes over the years, including the loss of charter authorizers in 2017 (Ball State University) and 2023 (Trine University). As of January 2024, the school is provisionally authorized by the Calumet College of St. Joseph.

== Athletics ==
During the 2009–2010 school year, Thea Bowman Leadership Academy's boys basketball team won the Class 1A State championship, in only its 2nd year of tournament play.

== See also ==
- List of high schools in Indiana
