= Lake Ridge Schools Corporation =

School district in Indiana

Location
- Gary, Indiana; United States

District information
- Type: Public
- Established: 1956
- Superintendent: Dr. Sharon Johnson-Shirley
- Chair of the board: Kimberly Osteen

Students and staff
- Enrollment: 1,644
- Faculty: 109

Other information
- Website: www.lakeridge.k12.in.us

Lake Ridge Schools Corporation is based in unincorporated Lake County, Indiana, United States and serves students within the unincorporated sections of the Calumet Township and portions of Gary.

== Schools ==
- Calumet New Tech High School (Unincorporated area)
- Lake Ridge New Tech Middle School (Unincorporated area)
- Longfellow New Tech Elementary School (Unincorporated area)

Former schools (all permanently closed):

- Black Oak Elementary School
- DeVault Elementary School
- Grissom Elementary School
- Hosford Park Elementary School
- Dulles Elementary School

== See also ==
- Gary Community School Corporation
- Education in Gary, Indiana
