= Gary Community School Corporation =

School district in Indiana

Address
- 900 Gerry Street Gary, Indiana, 46406; United States

District information
- Type: Public
- Grades: PreK–12
- Established: 1909; 117 years ago
- Superintendent: Dr. Yvonne Stokes
- NCES District ID: 1803870

Students and staff
- Students: 4,770 (2020–2021)
- Teachers: 280.98 (on an FTE basis)
- Staff: 300.0 (on an FTE basis)
- Student–teacher ratio: 16.98:1

Other information
- Website: garycsc.k12.in.us

Gary Community School Corporation is a school district headquartered in Gary, Indiana.

The school district includes the majority of Gary.

== History ==
In 2017, Gary Community Corp became the first school system in Indiana involved in a state takeover. Control of the district was transferred from the elected school board and appointed school superintendent to the State of Indiana's Distressed Unit Appeals Board, which placed MGT Consulting and Emergency Fiscal Manager Peggy Hinckley in charge of managing the district. Gary school board President Rosie Washington was quoted as saying "We Have No Power", in the context of the state's takeover. In November 2018, it was discovered that former Indiana Superintendent Tony Bennett, who directed policies that led to the state takeover, has an ownership stake in the for-profit company selected to manage the takeover with the potential to earn $11.4 million.

== School uniforms ==
All GCSC students from pre-Kindergarten through the 12th grade are required to wear school uniforms. Starting the 2007-2008 Academic School year, all schools followed the new "school uniform" policy. The school uniform policy varies for school and grade level, such as color.

== Schools ==
All schools are located in Gary. Gary Community School Corporation operates most of the public schools in the city proper.

High schools:

- West Side Leadership Academy

Middle schools:

- Bailly STEM Academy
- Gary Middle School

Elementary schools:

- Benjamin Banneker Achievement Center
- Beveridge Elementary School
- Glen Park Academy For Excellence In Learning
- Frankie W. McCullough Elementary School (formerly McCullough Academy for Girls)
- Daniel Hale Williams Elementary School

Early childhood centers:

- Mary McLeod Bethune Early Childhood Development Center

Ungraded:

- Gary Area Career Center

Former schools

- Thomas Jefferson Elementary School
- Jacques Marquette Elementary School
- Dr. Bernard C. Watson Academy for Boys
  - Dr. Bernard C. Watson Academy For Boys, an all boys' zoned elementary school, opened in 2006 in the former Dr. Charles R. Drew Elementary School. McCullough Academy for Girls, an all girls' zoned elementary school, opened in the former David O. Duncan Elementary School in 2006. These schools served Dorie Miller Public Housing Development and Delaney Public Housing Development. Watson was scheduled to close in 2014.
- Williams Annex - As of 2017 it was the sole school in the Gary CSC that only served middle school

== Former schools ==
=== High schools ===
School	Year closed
Emerson High School	2008
Horace Mann High School	2004
Lew Wallace High School	2014 (Note: Demolished in 2022)
Martin Luther King Jr. Academy	2018
Theodore Roosevelt College and Career Academy	2020
William A. Wirt High School	2009

Froebel High School 1977

Thomas A. Edison High School 1968

Tolleston High School 1969

=== Middle schools ===
School	Year closed
Alfred Beckman Middle School	2005
Bailly Middle School	—
Casimir Pulaski Junior High School	2014
Dunbar-Pulaski Middle School	2015
Thomas A. Edison Middle School	2003
Tolleston Middle School	2010

=== Elementary schools ===
School	Year closed	Notes
Aetna Elementary School	2005	
Alain L Locke Elementary School	2006 (Note: Later converted into Frankie Woods McCullough Academy)	
Ambridge Elementary School	2010	
Arthur P. Melton Elementary School	2006	
Benjamin Franklin Elementary School	2008	
Black Oak Elementary	2001 (Note: Demolished August 2017)	
Brunswick Elementary School	2016	
Daniel Webster Elementary School	2016	
Dr Bernard C. Watson Academy For Boys	2018	
Ernie Pyle Elementary School	2010	
Frankie Woods McCullough Academy for Girls	2012 (Note: Moved locations)	
George Washington Carver School	2006	
Grissom Elementary School	2014	
Horace S. Norton Elementary School	2006	
Ivanhoe Elementary School	2010	
Jacques Marquette Elementary School	2021	
James Whitcomb Riley Elementary School	2005	
Jefferson Elementary School	2018	
John H. Vohr Elementary	2010	
Kennedy King Elementary School	2009	Now Gary Middle School
George Kuny Elementary School	2010	
M C Bennett Holiness School	2004	
New Technical Innovative Institute Elementary School	2018	
Nobel Elementary School	2006	
School For Life Ministries	2014	
Spaulding Elementary School	2005	

== See also ==
- Gary Charter Schools
- Lake Ridge Schools Corporation
- Education in Gary, Indiana
