= Highland High School (Indiana) =

Location
- 9135 Erie Street; Highland, Indiana 46322-2735; United States
- 41°32′50″N 87°27′30″W

Information
- Type: Public high school
- Established: 1957
- School district: School Town of Highland
- Superintendent: Brian J. Smith
- Principal: John Zack
- Teaching staff: 53.50 (on a FTE basis)
- Grades: 9-12
- Enrollment: 980 (2023–2024)
- Student to teacher ratio: 18.32
- Colors: Blue and Gold
- Athletics conference: Northwest Crossroads
- Team name: Trojans
- Rival: Munster High School
- Newspaper: The Trojan Tribune
- Yearbook: Shield
- Website: www.highland.k12.in.us/o/hhs

Highland High School is a public high school located in the town of Highland in Lake County, Indiana. It is part of the School Town of Highland and serves as the only high school in the district. The school was founded in 1957 and incorporated in 1960.

== Demographics ==
The demographic breakdown of the 1,118 students enrolled in 2014-2015 was:

- Male - 51.6%
- Female - 48.4%
- Native American/Alaskan - 0.2%
- Asian/Pacific islanders - 1.2%
- Black - 5.4%
- Hispanic - 26.3%
- White - 64.8%
- Multiracial - 2.1%

30.6% of the students were eligible for free or reduced lunch.

== Athletics ==
The following sports are offered Highland High School:

- Baseball (boys)
- Basketball (boys & girls)
- Bowling (boys & girls)
- Cheerleading (girls)
- Cross Country (boys & girls)
- Dance (girls)
- Football (boys)
- Golf (boys & girls)
- Soccer (boys & girls)
- Softball (girls)
- Swimming (sport) (boys & girls)
- Tennis (boys & girls)
- Track and Field (boys & girls)
- Volleyball (girls)
- Wrestling (boys)

== Notable alumni ==
- Ward Cunningham, programmer and inventor of the wiki, who started programming at Highland High School
- Ryan Grigson, executive with NFL's Cleveland Browns, former general manager of Indianapolis Colts
- Tom Homco, former NFL player, Los Angeles Rams
- Rick Karr, journalist and educator
- Debra A. Kemp, author
- Georgette Mosbacher, businesswoman, political activist
- Debbie Patton, professional bodybuilder
- Dan Stevenson, politician
- Eric Justin Toth, replaced Osama bin Laden on FBI Ten Most Wanted Fugitives list, attended Southridge Elementary and Highland High schools before graduating from Indiana Academy for Science, Mathematics and Humanities in 2000
- Jim Umpleby, businessman, CEO of Caterpillar Inc.

== See also ==
- List of high schools in Indiana
