= Highland, Lake County, Indiana =

Highland, Indiana
- Town

- Location of Highland in Lake County, Indiana.
- Coordinates: 41°32′59″N 87°27′29″W
- Country: United States
- State: Indiana
- County: Lake
- Township: North
- Settled: 1848
- Incorporated: April 4, 1910

Government
  - Type: Town
  - Body: Town Council
  - President: George Georgeff (R, 1st)
  - Vice-President: G. Doug Turich (R, 2nd)
  - Councilors: Alex Robertson (D, 3rd); Thomas Black (R, 4th); Philip Scheeringa (R, 5th)
  - Clerk-Treasurer: Mark Herak (D)

Area
  - Total: 6.97 sq mi (18.06 km^{2})
  - Land: 6.94 sq mi (17.97 km^{2})
  - Water: 0.039 sq mi (0.10 km^{2})
- Elevation: 623 ft (190 m)

Population (2020)
  - Total: 23,984
  - Density: 3,457.1/sq mi (1,334.78/km^{2})

Standard of living (2008-12)
  - Per capita income: $30,036
  - Median home value: $155,200
- Time zone: UTC−6 (Central)
  - Summer (DST): UTC−5 (Central)
- ZIP code: 46322
- Area code: 219
- FIPS code: 18-33466
- GNIS feature ID: 0436149
- Website: www.highland.in.gov

Highland is a town in Lake County, Indiana, United States. The population was 23,984 at the 2020 census. The town was incorporated on April 4, 1910. It is a part of the Chicago metropolitan area and North Township, and is surrounded by Hammond to the north, Munster to the west, Schererville to the south and Griffith to the east.

== History ==
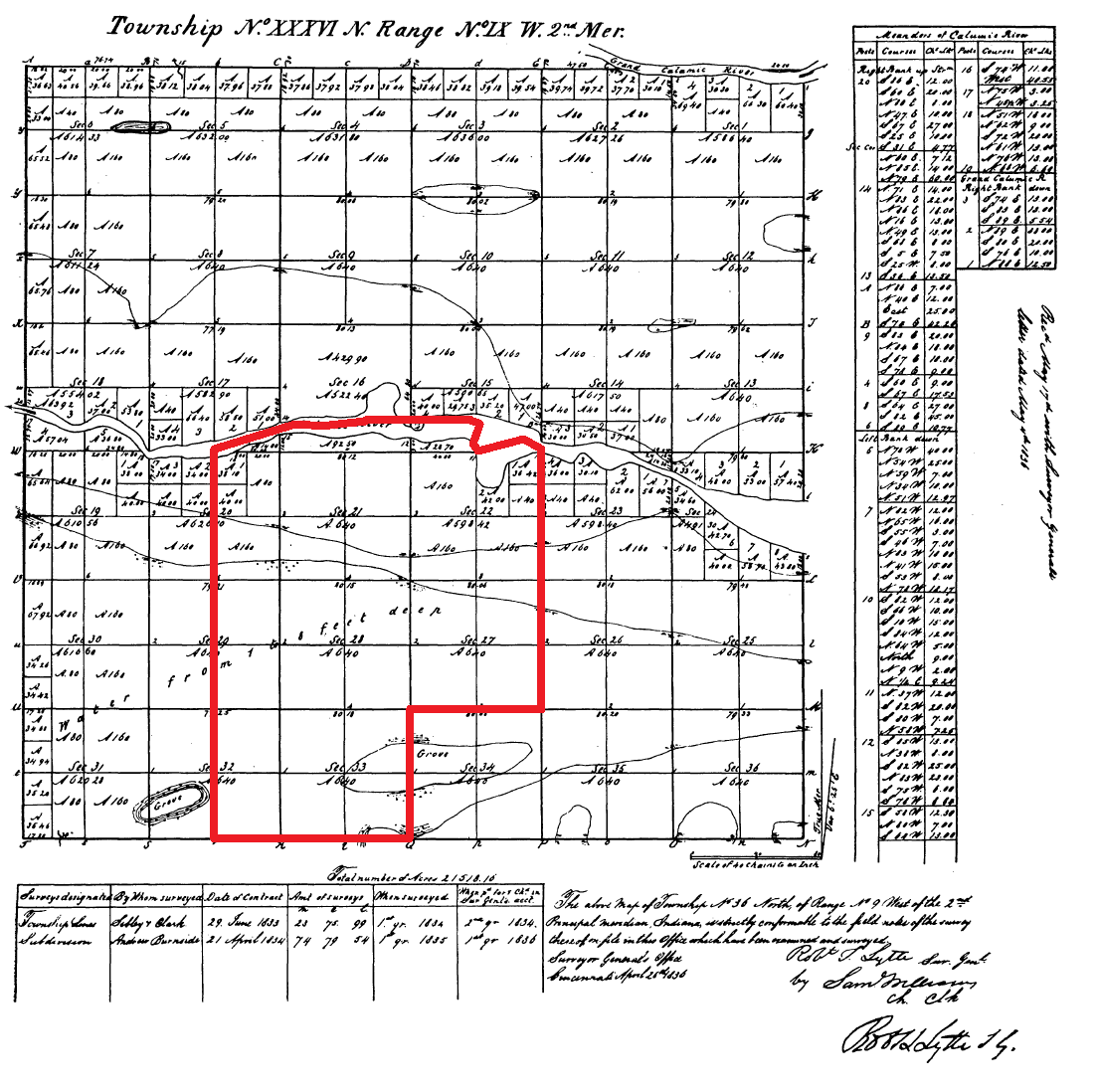
An 1836 government survey plat of Indiana Survey Township 36N, Range 9W, 2nd Principal Meridian, with the modern borders of Highland outlined in red.

In 1847, two pioneers from Ohio, Michael and Judith Johnston, became Highland's first settlers. The town slowly expanded until the early 1880s, when the development of Chicago & Atlantic railroad trackage through the town attracted agriculture and manufacturing industries. Dutch settlers began moving to Highland shortly thereafter from nearby Munster. 304 people resided in Highland when it was incorporated in 1910. In 1992, the Indiana Historical Bureau placed a state historical marker at 8941 Kleinman Road (41°33′2″N 87°26′14″W) to recognize the immigration of Dutch in the Calumet Region.

In 1927, President Calvin Coolidge visited and delivered the dedication address for Wicker Memorial Park, located on the west side of the town. Highland, as with other towns along the Little Calumet River, has historically been subject to flooding, particularly during spring, and particularly in areas away from Ridge Road, which runs along the highest land in the town. Significant floods have affected Highland in 2008, 2007, and especially in September 2006.

On October 31, 2008, Barack Obama, who four days later would be elected the 44th President of the United States, stopped in Highland for a rally that drew 40,000 people to Wicker Park. It was the largest crowd there since President Coolidge dedicated the park in 1927.

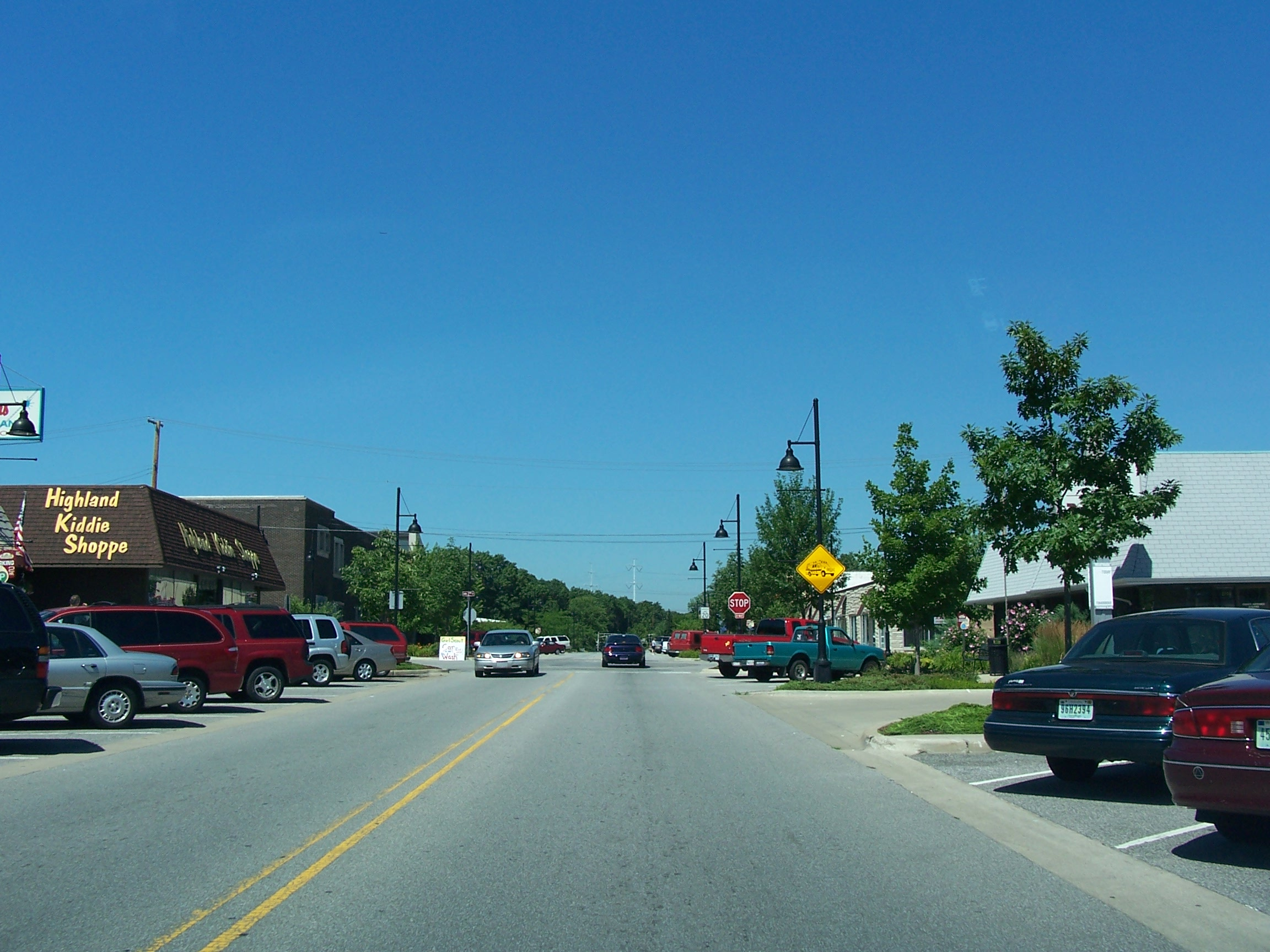
Shops in Highland, Indiana (2nd Street & Highway Avenue)

== Geography ==
According to the 2010 census, Highland has a total area of 6.96 square miles (18.03 km^{2}), of which 6.94 square miles (17.97 km^{2}) (or 99.71%) is land and 0.02 square miles (0.05 km^{2}) (or 0.29%) is water.

=== Neighborhoods ===
Highland has several neighborhoods and subdivisions. They include: Arbor Hill, Boulevard Estates, Brantwood, Ellendale, Golfmoor, Highland Terrace Estates, Homestead, Hook's, Lakeside, Meadows, Pettit Park, Sandalwood, Southridge, White Oak Estates (of Highland), Wicker Highlands, Wicker Park Estates and Wicker Park Manor (Frog Hollow).

Highland's small downtown is located around Highway Avenue, close to Kennedy Avenue. It developed there as the Erie Lackawanna Railway went through that specific area. As the railway tracks were abandoned since, the Erie Lackawanna Trail runs nowadays through downtown Highland instead.

=== Architecture ===
Highland's downtown area features a number of buildings exhibiting Mid-Century Modern style architecture.

== Demographics ==
Historical population
Census	Pop.	Note	%±
1910	304		—
1920	542		78.3%
1930	1,553		186.5%
1940	2,723		75.3%
1950	5,878		115.9%
1960	16,284		177.0%
1970	24,947		53.2%
1980	25,935		4.0%
1990	23,696		−8.6%
2000	23,546		−0.6%
2010	23,727		0.8%
2020	23,984		1.1%
Source: US Census Bureau

=== 2020 census ===
Highland town, Indiana – Racial and ethnic composition Note: the US Census treats Hispanic/Latino as an ethnic category. This table excludes Latinos from the racial categories and assigns them to a separate category. Hispanics/Latinos may be of any race.
Race / Ethnicity (NH = Non-Hispanic)	Pop 2000	Pop 2010	Pop 2020	% 2000	% 2010	% 2020
White alone (NH)	21,231	19,039	16,411	90.17%	80.24%	68.42%
Black or African American alone (NH)	280	965	1,793	1.19%	4.07%	7.48%
Native American or Alaska Native alone (NH)	24	24	22	0.10%	0.10%	0.09%
Asian alone (NH)	252	371	415	1.07%	1.56%	1.73%
Native Hawaiian or Pacific Islander alone (NH)	1	1	2	0.00%	0.00%	0.01%
Other race alone (NH)	14	15	67	0.06%	0.06%	0.28%
Mixed race or Multiracial (NH)	187	265	805	0.79%	1.12%	3.36%
Hispanic or Latino (any race)	1,557	3,047	4,469	6.61%	12.84%	18.63%
Total	23,546	23,727	23,984	100.00%	100.00%	100.00%

=== 2010 census ===
As of the census of 2010, there were 23,727 people, 9,924 households, and 6,547 families living in the town. The population density was 3,418.9 inhabitants per square mile (1,320.0/km^{2}). There were 10,335 housing units at an average density of 1,489.2 per square mile (575.0/km^{2}). The racial makeup of the town was 88.6% White, 4.2% African American, 0.2% Native American, 1.6% Asian, 3.4% from other races, and 2.0% from two or more races. Hispanic or Latino of any race were 12.8% of the population.

There were 9,924 households, of which 28.5% had children under the age of 18 living with them, 49.9% were married couples living together, 11.8% had a female householder with no husband present, 4.3% had a male householder with no wife present, and 34.0% were non-families. 29.4% of all households were made up of individuals, and 11.9% had someone living alone who was 65 years of age or older. The average household size was 2.39 and the average family size was 2.97.

The median age in the town was 41.5 years. 20.9% of residents were under the age of 18; 7.8% were between the ages of 18 and 24; 26% were from 25 to 44; 27.9% were from 45 to 64; and 17.3% were 65 years of age or older. The gender makeup of the town was 48.0% male and 52.0% female.

=== 2000 census ===
As of the census of 2000, there were 23,546 people, 9,636 households, and 6,677 families living in the town. The population density was 3,428.3 inhabitants per square mile (1,323.7/km^{2}). There were 9,925 housing units at an average density of 1,445.1 per square mile (558.0/km^{2}). The racial makeup of the town was 94.45% White, 1.26% African American, 0.15% Native American, 1.10% Asian, 0.02% Pacific Islander, 1.80% from other races, and 1.21% from two or more races. Hispanic or Latino of any race were 6.61% of the population.

There were 9,636 households, out of which 27.6% had children under the age of 18 living with them, 56.5% were married couples living together, 9.6% had a female householder with no husband present, and 30.7% were non-families. 26.5% of all households were made up of individuals, and 10.9% had someone living alone who was 65 years of age or older. The average household size was 2.44 and the average family size was 2.97.

In the town, the population was spread out, with 21.5% under the age of 18, 8.0% from 18 to 24, 28.9% from 25 to 44, 25.0% from 45 to 64, and 16.6% who were 65 years of age or older. The median age was 40 years. For every 100 females, there were 92.2 males. For every 100 females age 18 and over there were 89.2 males.

The median income for a household in the town was $51,297, and the median income for a family was $59,106. Males had a median income of $46,217 versus $28,635 for females. The per capita income for the town was $24,530. About 1.8% of families and 3.0% of the population were below the poverty line, including 3.4% of those under age 18 and 3.7% of those age 65 or over.

== Transportation ==
The commercial airport closest to Highland is the Gary/Chicago International Airport in Gary, but most Highland residents and visitors travel from Chicago's O'Hare International Airport or Chicago Midway International Airport.

Highland lies just south of the Borman Expressway. US 41, known locally as Indianapolis Boulevard, is a major north–south artery in the town. Due to Highland's proximity to Chicago, several other Interstate and U.S. highways are within a 20-mile (32 km) radius.

The town's pedestrians and cyclists are served by the Erie Lackawanna Trail, a cycling/multiuse, paved rail trail, which cuts diagonally through Highland, connecting the town with Griffith, and Crown Point, to the southeast. The Highland portion of the trail is also known locally as the Crosstown Trail. The trail runs along the former right-of-way of the Erie-Lackawanna and Baltimore and Ohio railroads, and will eventually connect pedestrians to Chicago, Illinois, to the northwest and beyond Crown Point to the southeast by planned trail extensions. The trail also links Highland, by connections with other trails, with Porter County to the east.

Highland is directly south of the East Chicago South Shore Line station on the Lakeshore Corridor line, and directly east of two stations on the Monon Corridor line. The Monon Corridor stations are Munster Ridge and Munster/Dyer. Those stations opened to revenue service on March 31, 2026.

== Education ==
The School Town of Highland is the town's public school system, which operates Highland High School, which was established in 1957, as well as a middle school and four elementary schools. The area where the former Main School once stood is marked by a gazebo, which was demolished in October 2006 and rebuilt in 2007. It and the surrounding land are named Main Square Park after the now-defunct school that stood on the site until 1977. One of the other defunct schools, Lincoln Elementary, was converted into a community center in the early 1980s. The other, Orchard Park Elementary, closed in 1981 and was later purchased and reopened as a Calumet Baptist School in the early 1990s.

List of schools – School Town of Highland

- Highland High School
- Highland Middle School
- Judith Morton Johnston Elementary School
- Mildred Merkley Elementary School
- Southridge Elementary School
- Allen J. Warren Elementary School

Highland also contains three private schools. Highland Christian School was founded in 1909 and has been in its present building and location since 1951. Our Lady of Grace School was founded in 1954 and is run by the Diocese of Gary. There is also Bible Baptist School that operates on the site of the former Orchard Elementary School.

== Public libraries ==
Lake County Public Library operates the Highland Branch at 2841 Jewett Street.

== Recreation ==
Wicker Memorial Park, at 8554 Indianapolis Boulevard, is owned and operated by the North Township trustee and was dedicated in 1927. Featured are a 72-par, 18-hole golf course, three miles of trails, volleyball and tennis courts, a dog run, playground, splash pad, picnic areas and banquet facilities.

The Hoosier Prairie State Nature Preserve, established in 1976, is a 1,547-acre wetland prairie habitat located in an area in the vicinity of Main Street and Kennedy Avenue and partially in Highland, Griffith and Schererville. It is a unit of the Indiana Dunes National Lakeshore and managed by the Indiana Department of Natural Resources.

Highland Parks and Recreation operates the Lincoln Community Center, Sharp Athletic Complex and the four-mile Erie-Lackawanna Trail. The Main Square Park Gazebo is a popular site for wedding ceremonies as well as a number of community events and festivals during the year. In addition to Homestead, Markley, Meadows and Sheppard parks, which offer shelters for picnics and gatherings, there are 16 other parks maintained with various amenities throughout the town.

List of parks and recreational facilities – Highland Parks and Recreation

- Brantwood Park
- Erie-Lackawanna Trail
- Fletcher Park
- 45th & 5th Street Park
- Grand Park
- Homestead Park
- Jaycee Park
- Lakeside Outlot Park
- Lakeside Park
- Lincoln Community Center
- Little Turtle Park
- Main Square Park
- Markley Park
- Meadows Outlot Park
- Meadows Park
- Northwood Park
- Orchard Park
- Pettit Park
- Sharp Athletic Complex
- Sheppard Park
- Terrace Park
- Toth Park
- White Oak Park

== Notable people ==
- Ward Cunningham, programmer and inventor of the wiki, who started programming at Highland High School
- Ryan Grigson, executive with NFL's Cleveland Browns, former general manager of Indianapolis Colts
- Tom Homco, former NFL player, Los Angeles Rams
- Rick Karr, journalist and educator
- Debra A. Kemp, author
- Biscuit Miller, blues musician
- Georgette Mosbacher, businesswoman, United States Ambassador to Poland
- Frank J. Mrvan, U.S. representative, former North Township trustee
- Debbie Patton, professional bodybuilder
- Dan Stevenson, politician
- Eric Justin Toth, replaced Osama bin Laden on FBI Ten Most Wanted Fugitives list
- Jim Umpleby, businessman, CEO of Caterpillar Inc.
- Cornelius Van Til, Christian philosopher, Reformed theologian, and presuppositional apologist
- Rosemary Watson, comedian and celebrity impersonator

== See also ==
- List of Indiana state historical markers in Lake County
