= Doug Oberhelman =

American businessman (born 1953)

Douglas R. Oberhelman
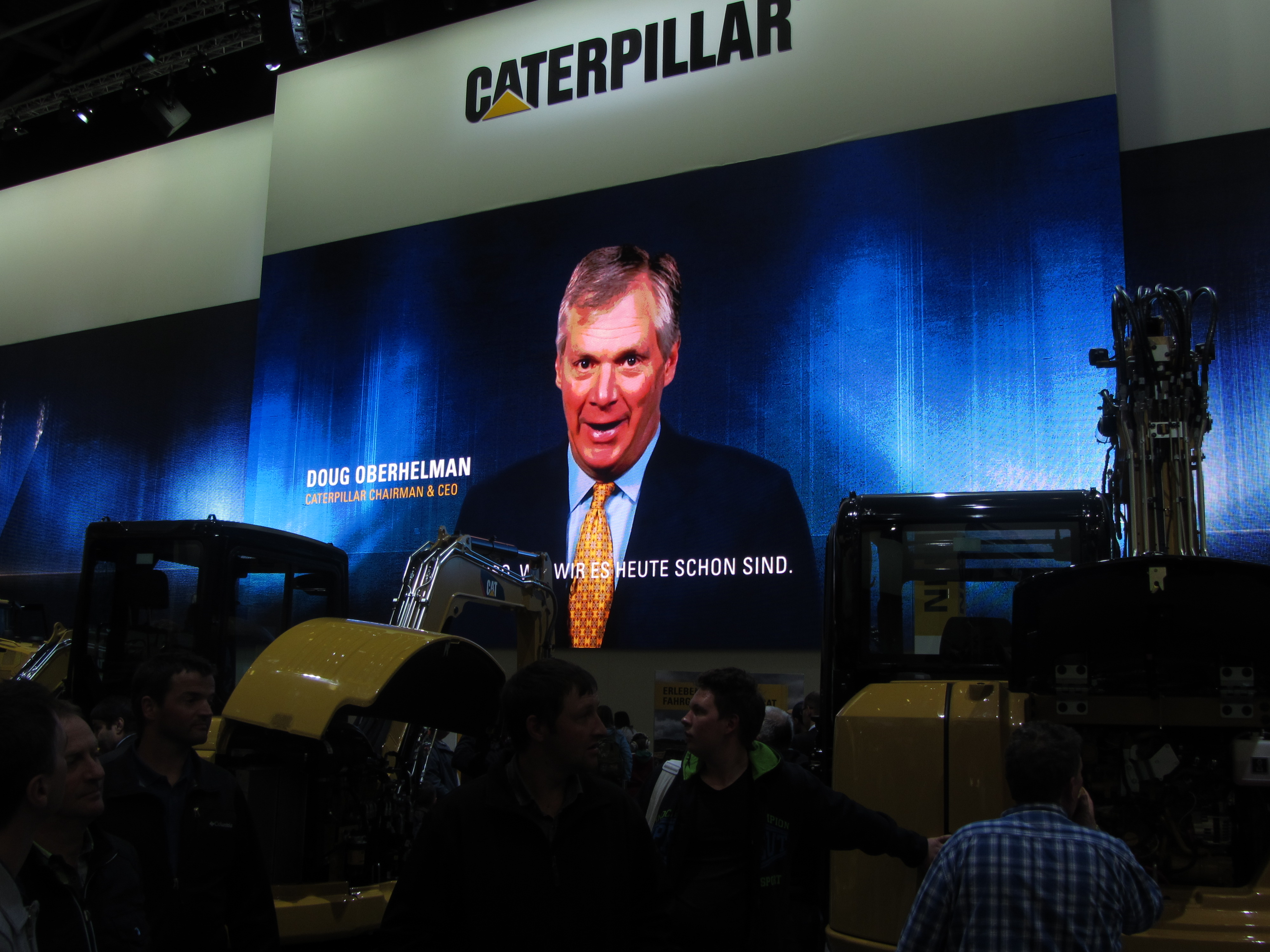
- Born: February 25, 1953 (age 73)
- Education: Millikin University (1975)
- Occupation: Business executive
- Years active: 1975–present
- Employer: Caterpillar Inc.
- Board member of: Exxon Mobil Corporation; The Nature Conservancy Illinois Chapter; Association of Equipment Manufacturers; National Association of Manufacturers; Wetlands America Trust (vice-president of trustees); Ameren (former); Easter Seals (former chairman); Millikin University (former chairman); South Side Bank (former)
- Spouse: Diane Cullinan

CEO, Caterpillar
- In office July 1, 2010 – December 31, 2016
- Preceded by: James W. Owens
- Succeeded by: Jim Umpleby

Chairman of the Board, Caterpillar
- In office November 1, 2010 – March 31, 2017
- Preceded by: James W. Owens
- Succeeded by: Dave Calhoun

Douglas R. Oberhelman (born February 25, 1953) is an American businessman. He is the former CEO and Executive Chairman of Caterpillar Inc. in Peoria, Illinois.

== Biography ==
=== Early life and education ===
Oberhelman was raised in Woodstock, Illinois, where his father was a John Deere salesman. His family originates from Westphalia, Germany. Oberhelman attended Millikin University, where he was a member of Sigma Alpha Epsilon. He graduated with a Bachelor of Arts in Finance in 1975.

=== Career ===
Oberhelman joined Caterpillar shortly after his college graduation in 1975. He became a Caterpillar Vice President in 1995, serving as Chief Financial Officer from 1995 to 1998. He succeeded Jim Owens as CEO on July 1, 2010 and as Executive Chairman of the Board on November 1, 2010. Oberhelman retired from Caterpillar in 2017.

He sat on the board of Ameren until April 27, 2010. He served as Vice Chairman of the Executive Committee of The Business Council in 2013 and 2014.

In September 2009, he was elected to the Board of Directors of World Resources Institute.

=== Personal life ===
His wife, Diane Oberhelman, is chairwoman of Cullinan Properties Ltd.

In 2011 Oberhelman earned an income (including options, bonus etc.) of $16.9 million, a sixty percent increase from his earnings the previous year.
