= Erie Lackawanna Trail =

Rail trail in Lake County, Indiana, U.S.

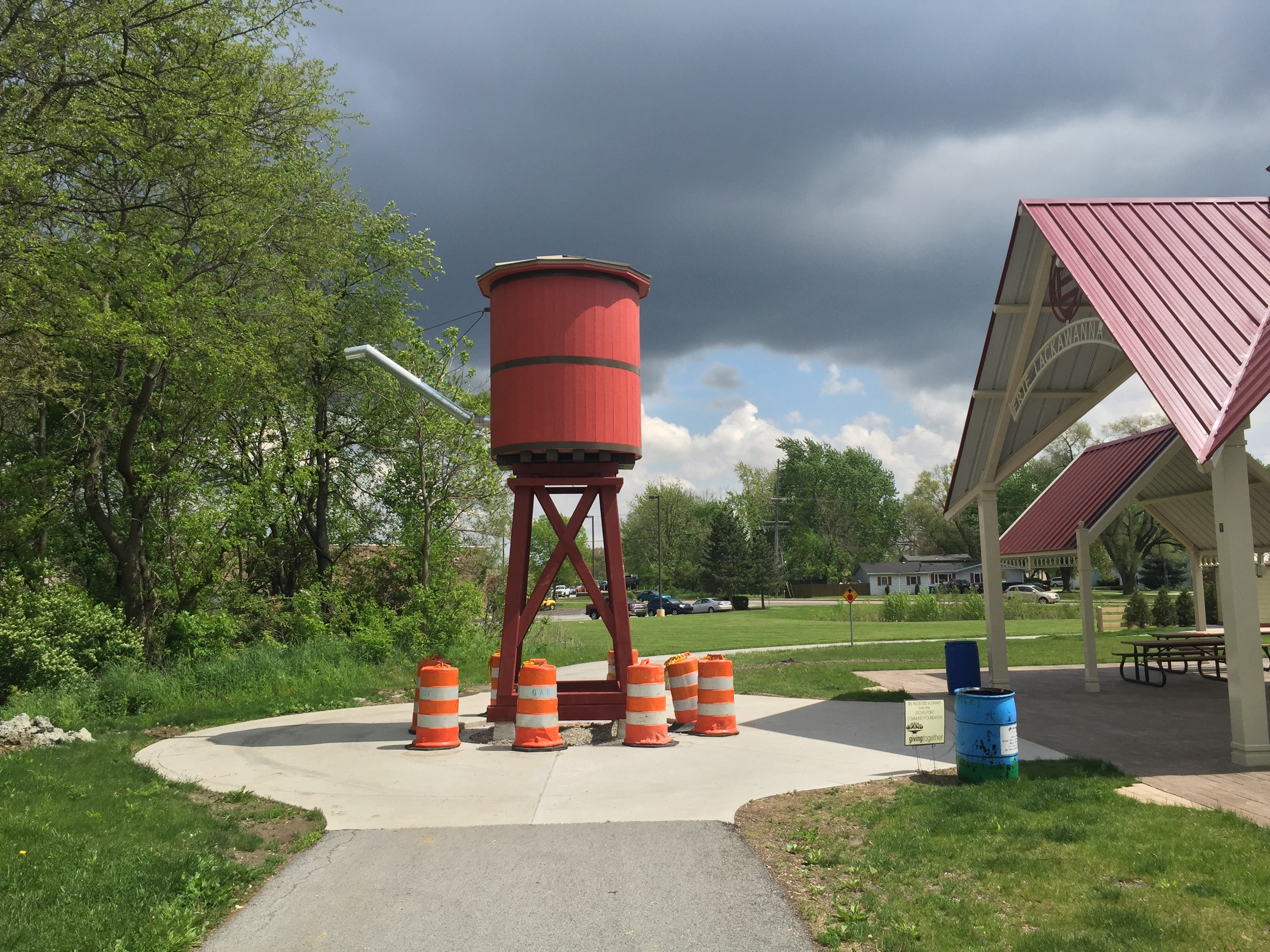
- The Erie Lackawanna Trailhead near downtown Crown Point was completed in 2014.
- Length: 17.7 miles (28.5 km)
- Location: Lake County, Indiana
- Established: 1990s-present (in segments)
- Designation: U.S. Bicycle Route 36
- Trailheads: Hammond–Crown Point
- Use: Shared use path
- Season: Year round
- Surface: Asphalt
- Right of way: Erie Lackawanna Railway; Pennsylvania Railroad (partially)
- Website: http://www.indianatrails.org

Erie Lackawanna Trail is a rail trail located in Lake County, Indiana, which runs along the former Erie Lackawanna Railway. The trail begins in the city of Hammond then passes through the towns of Highland, Griffith, Schererville, and Merrillville before coming to an end in the county seat Crown Point. It covers a total of 17.7 miles (28.5 km).

== History ==
The original Erie-Lackawanna right-of-way was an important freight route through Lake County; although, with the decline of railroad traffic in the United States, the line was abandoned in 1986 by Conrail. After it was abandoned, plans were made by Hammond's Parks and Recreation Department to develop the former right-of-way into a trail system. The first portions of the Erie Lackawanna Trail were created in the mid-1990s, having been continually extended since then.

The trail currently connects to the Monon Trail in downtown Hammond, and the Oak Savannah Trail in Griffith. The Erie Lackawanna is in the vicinity of Pennsy Greenway in Schererville. Today, the trail is a shared use path, complete with trailheads, park amenities, and local attractions near it. It is currently the longest contiguous trail in Northwest Indiana.

== Visitor attractions along the trail ==
- Hammond Civic Center
- Indiana Visitors' Center
- Wicker Memorial Park
- Griffith Historical Park & Railroad Museum
- Ivan Gatlin Nature Preserve

== See also ==
- Cycling in Chicago
- American Discovery Trail
