= The Business Council =

American organization

The Business Council is a nonpartisan organization of business leaders headquartered in Washington, D.C. It holds meetings several times a year for high-level policy discussions, allowing CEOs of multinational companies to network with leaders in politics, science, and academia. The CEOs discuss business strategies and provide input on government policy.

Founded in 1933, The Business Council has been described as one of the most influential commerce groups in the United States, with U.S. presidents regularly seeking its advice. As of 2026, Target executive chairman Brian Cornell is chair of the organization’s executive committee.

== Mission ==
The Business Council allows global CEOs to gather and network along with leaders in politics, science, and academia. The organization is guided by the belief that the business community's contributions to public discourse and governance are in the interest of the common good of the American people. Member CEOs discuss strategies and innovation for their respective companies, as well as providing input on government policy.

Membership is by invitation-only and limited to CEOs of leading multinational businesses personally selected by fellow members of The Business Council. The organization is strictly nonpartisan and headquartered in Washington, D.C.

During the COVID-19 pandemic, The Business Council helped global companies navigate the public health crisis. The organization conducted weekly CEO calls at the height of the pandemic, inviting chief executives and other experts to discuss COVID vaccines, treatments, and other topics.

The Business Council issues a quarterly “Measure of CEO Confidence” in collaboration with The Conference Board, surveying more than 100 CEOs about current economic conditions and expectations about the future. The chief executives also share their sentiments about U.S. employment, recruiting, wages, capital spending, and other economic indicators. Roger W. Ferguson, Jr., vice chairman of The Business Council, has appeared on CNBC to discuss the survey findings.

== History ==
The Business Council was founded by Secretary of Commerce Daniel C. Roper and investment banker Sidney Weinberg as the Business Advisory Council for the United States Department of Commerce in 1933, under President Franklin D. Roosevelt. It formed the Industrial Advisory Board for the National Recovery Administration during the Great Depression. It also established committees to discuss the Securities Exchange Act of 1934, the Banking Act of 1935 and the Social Security Act.

According to the Detroit Free Press, the organization was designed “for corporate titans to offer counsel and advise to the federal government.” It was renamed The Business Council as an organization independent from the Department of Commerce in 1961, under President John F. Kennedy. In 2009, then-President Barack Obama claimed, "Every President since Franklin Delano Roosevelt has sought the advice of the Business Council."

In 2024, the Minnesota Star Tribune described The Business Council as "one of the most influential national commerce groups."

== Leadership ==
Marlene Colucci is CEO of The Business Council. Appointed in 2013, Colucci has held leadership positions in public policy at the White House, U.S. Department of Labor, and American Hotel and Lodging Association. She describes the organization as "an important voice for the business community with a high level of personal engagement by its members.”

In August 2025, Colucci spoke at a U.S. Chamber of Commerce event on leadership and board service. That same year, she was named "one of the most powerful women in Washington" by the Washingtonian.

Prior to Colucci, Philip Cassidy was executive director of The Business Council for more than two decades.

== Current executive committee ==
The executive committee is composed of the following people:

=== Chair ===
- Brian Cornell, Board Chairman and Chief Executive Officer, Target

=== Members ===
- Corie Barry, CEO, Best Buy
- Jeff Bezos, Founder & Former CEO, Amazon
- Gail K. Boudreaux, President & CEO, Elevance Health, Inc.
- Thomas Buberl, Chief Executive Officer, AXA
- John Donahoe, Former President and CEO, Nike
- Thasunda Duckett, President and Chief Executive Officer, TIAA
- Egon Durban, Managing Partner and Co-CEO, Silver Lake
- Jim Farley, President and CEO, Ford
- Roger Ferguson, Immediate Past President and CEO, TIAA (Vice Survey Chair)
- Jim Fitterling, Chair and Chief Executive Officer, Dow Chemical Company
- Adena Friedman, Chair and CEO, Nasdaq, Inc.
- Michelle Gass, President and CEO, Levi Strauss & Co.
- Ken Griffin, Founder and CEO, Citadel
- Henry R. Kravis, Executive Co-Chairman, Kohlberg Kravis Roberts
- Ryan Marshall, President and CEO, PulteGroup
- Jon Moeller, Chairman, President, and CEO, Procter & Gamble
- Satya Nadella, Chairman and CEO, Microsoft
- David M. Solomon, Chairman and CEO, Goldman Sachs
- Lisa Su, Chair and CEO, AMD
- Jim Umpleby III, Chairman and CEO, Caterpillar Inc.
- Emma Walmsley, CEO, GlaxoSmithKline
- Kathy Warden, Chairman, CEO, and President, Northrop Grumman
- Mike Wirth, Chairman & CEO, Chevron Corporation

== Former chairs ==
- 1933: Gerard Swope, General Electric
- 1934: S. Clay Williams, RJ Reynolds Tobacco Company
- 1934–35: Henry P. Kendall, Kendall Company
- 1936: George H. Mead, Mead Corporation
- 1937–39: W. Averell Harriman, Brown Brothers & Co.
- 1940–41: William L. Batt, War Production Board
- 1942–43: R. R. Deupree, Procter & Gamble
- 1944–45: Thomas B. McCabe, Scott Paper Company
- 1946: George M. Humphrey, National Steel Corporation
- 1947–48: John L. Collyer, Goodrich Corporation
- 1949–50: James S. Knowlson, Stewart-Warner
- 1951–52: Robert T. Stevens, JP Stevens & Company
- 1953: John D. Biggers, Libbey-Owens-Ford
- 1954–55: Harold Boeschenstein, Owens Corning
- 1956–57: Eugene Holman, Standard Oil of New Jersey (ExxonMobil)
- 1958–59: Stephen Bechtel, Jr., Bechtel
- 1960–61: Ralph J. Cordiner, General Electric
- 1961–62: Roger Blough, US Steel
- 1963–64: F. R. Kappel, AT&T
- 1965–66: W.B. Murphy, Campbell Soup Company
- 1967–68: Albert L. Nickerson, Mobil (ExxonMobil)
- 1969–70: Fred J. Borch, General Electric
- 1971–72: William M. Batten, JCPenney
- 1973–74: David Packard, Hewlett-Packard
- 1975–76: Edmund W. Littlefield, General Electric
- 1977–78: John D. deButts, AT&T
- 1979–80: Reginald H. Jones, General Electric
- 1981–82: Walter B. Wriston, Citicorp
- 1983–84: Clifton C. Garvin, Jr., Exxon (ExxonMobil)
- 1985–86: Ruben F. Mettler, TRW
- 1987–88: Stephen Bechtel, Jr., Bechtel
- 1989–90: Roger B. Smith, General Motors
- 1991–92: John F. Welch, Jr., General Electric
- 1993–94: Robert E. Allen, AT&T
- 1995–96: Edgar S. Woolard, Jr., DuPont
- 1997–98: Larry Bossidy, AlliedSignal
- 1999-00: Ralph S. Larsen, Johnson & Johnson
- 2001–02: William T. Esrey, Sprint Corporation
- 2003–04: Charles O. Holliday, Jr., Bank of America
- 2005–06: Jeffrey R. Immelt, General Electric
- 2007–08: W. James McNerney, Jr., Boeing
- 2009–10: James W. Owens, Caterpillar
- 2011–12: Jamie Dimon, JPMorgan Chase
- 2013–14: Andrew Liveris, Dow Chemical Company
- 2015–16: Jeff Bezos, Amazon
- 2017–18: Henry R. Kravis, Kohlberg Kravis Roberts
- 2019–20: John Donahoe, Nike
- 2021–22: Satya Nadella, Microsoft
- 2023–24: Gail K. Boudreaux, President & CEO, Elevance Health, Inc.
