= Darrow Tully =

American newspaper publisher (1932–2010)

Darrow J. "Duke" Tully (February 27, 1932 – June 20, 2010) was a former publisher of the Arizona Republic and the Phoenix Gazette newspapers, published in Phoenix. Both were owned by Central Newspapers, Inc., headquartered in Indianapolis, Indiana, at the time. Central Newspapers was founded by Eugene C. Pulliam, grandfather of United States Vice President Dan Quayle.

== Early life ==
Tully was born on February 27, 1932, in Charleston, West Virginia. He attended undergraduate school at Purdue University, receiving his BA in journalism and English from Calumet College. He received an honorary PhD from the Calumet College of St. Joseph.

== Career ==
Tully had a forty-year media management career encompassing newspapers, radio, television, direct mail and marketing and was associated with such media conglomerates as Knight-Ridder Inc., the Chronicle Publishing Company, Central Newspapers Inc. and the Maritz Corporation. In 1956 he was named vice president and general manager of Knight-Ridder–owned WDSM-TV-AM-FM in Duluth, Minnesota, becoming the youngest CEO in broadcasting at the time. With Knight-Ridder he went on to become publisher of the Gary Post Tribune (Gary, Indiana), the Pasadena Star-News and the Independent (Pasadena, California), and The Wichita Eagle and Beacon (Wichita, Kansas).

Tully joined the San Francisco Newspaper Agency in 1975 (publisher of the San Francisco Chronicle and The San Francisco Examiner) as president and general manager. In 1978 he joined Central Newspapers, Inc. as vice-president, publisher and general manager of the Arizona Republic and the Phoenix Gazette (Phoenix, Arizona). In 1986 he joined Wick Communications, Inc. (Sierra Vista, Arizona) and was involved in newspaper operations in North Dakota, Montana, California and Arizona. He became president, publisher and CEO of Beacon Communications, Inc. (a division of the Chronicle Publishing Company) in 1991 and was responsible for the operations of thirteen daily and weekly newspapers in New England. After participating in negotiations for the sale of Beacon to Fidelity Capital, he remained as a consultant to the Chronicle Publishing Company for several years and became a consultant to the Maritz Corporation of St. Louis, Missouri.

== Claim of military service ==
Tully falsely claimed to be a veteran of the United States Air Force, and would speak publicly about his military service, with claims that included service in both the Korean and Vietnam Wars. He also attended veteran's functions as a fellow member in uniform, ranked as a colonel, and was often invited as a Guest of Honor. By 1985, however, he was regretting and feeling the pressure of his claims, and started dropping not-so-subtle hints that he had never served in the military. Bill Shover, a Phoenix Newspapers Inc. executive, urged him to quietly get rid of his uniforms and to stop telling war stories, but Tully refused to stay quiet. Shover later commented that, "It's almost like he was trying to get caught."

== Resignation ==
Just prior to Christmas 1985, Tully suddenly and unexpectedly resigned. It was then publicly revealed that Tom Collins, the Maricopa County District Attorney at the time, had been quietly investigating Tully's claim of military service. Collins had been criticized earlier by the Arizona Republic for taking a trip with his family at taxpayers expense. The sudden resignation of Tully and revelation of his false military record created intense local media coverage and analysis for some time, particularly because it centered on one of the most powerful members of the local media and community. In the final analysis, however, it was generally concluded that the issue had no effect on the operation or content of the newspapers Tully oversaw.

== Legacy ==
In his role as publisher of the two daily newspapers in Phoenix, Tully was instrumental in helping United States Senator John McCain from Arizona, the Republican Party candidate in the 2008 U.S. presidential election, enter politics. He has been credited with helping McCain win his first campaign for public office in 1982, when he was elected to the U.S. House of Representatives, and his subsequent re-election in 1984. He is also the Godfather of Meghan, McCain's first child with wife Cindy.

== Awards and charities ==
Tully was awarded numerous writing and public service awards during his career, including the Arizona State University Distinguished Achievement Award, the Planned Parenthood Media Excellence Award, the Associated Press/Northern Arizona University Distinguished Journalist Award, the Anti-Defamation League Torch of Liberty Award, the City of Hope Man of the Year Award, and the Who's Who Historical Society Golden State Award. A frequent lecturer at numerous journalism/telecommunications universities including Columbia University, University of Chicago and the University of Kansas, he was an avid defender of the First Amendment.

Active in civic, charitable and arts activities, Tully served as a trustee, director or officer of the Arizona Ballet, Wichita Music Theater, Phoenix Zoo, Heard Museum, University of Kansas William Allen White Foundation and Arizona State University Walter Cronkite School of Journalism and Mass Communication and was a frequent lecturer at The American Press Institute. An avid flier, he served two terms as chairman of the Indiana Aeronautics Commission and holds a commercial pilot's license with single engine sea, multi-engine land and instrument ratings.

Tully was a food and wine connoisseur and a Commandeur (20 years plus member) of La Chaine des Rottiseurs, as well as an officer of the Tampa-Sun Coast chapter. United States President Ronald Reagan appointed him to serve on the Committee on Physical Fitness under Washington Redskins' Coach George Allen. He is also a biographee in Marquis' Who's Who in America and Who's Who in the South and Southwest.

== Later life ==
Tully moved to Tampa, Florida, from Concord, Massachusetts, with his wife Victoria in 1992. He died on June 20, 2010, from complications following a stroke. He is survived by his wife, a daughter, a son, and four grandchildren.
