= Calumet College of St. Joseph =

Catholic college in Hammond, Indiana, US

- Former names: Calumet Center of Saint Joseph's College (1951–1971); St. Joseph Calumet College (1971–1973)
- Type: Private college
- Established: 1951; 75 years ago
- Religious affiliation: Roman Catholic (C.PP.S.)
- Endowment: US$4.1million
- President: Ron Tulley
- Students: 658 (fall 2022)
- Undergraduates: 563 (fall 2022)
- Postgraduates: 95 (fall 2022)
- Location: Whiting, Indiana, U.S. 41.6709°N 87.4944°W
- Campus: 20 acres (8.1 ha); Suburban
- Colors: Crimson & Gray
- Nickname: Crimson Wave
- Sporting affiliations: NAIA – CCAC
- Mascot: Crimson Joe
- Website: ccsj.edu

Calumet College of St. Joseph is a private Catholic college in Whiting, Indiana, United States. It was founded in 1951 as an extension of Saint Joseph's College and is associated with the Missionaries of the Precious Blood. In fall 2022, it enrolled 658 undergraduates and 95 graduate students.

== History ==
In 1951, St. Joseph's College of Rensselaer, Indiana, opened an extension in Lake County, Indiana. It was known as the "Calumet Center". Most of its courses were taught in borrowed classrooms provided by the Bishop Noll Institute in Hammond and St. John the Baptist Church in Whiting. In 1960, the Board of Control authorized the expansion of this two-year extension into a full four-year, degree-granting college. In doing so, the institution became the first college in the Calumet Region to offer baccalaureate degrees. At that time, St. Joseph's College Calumet Campus moved into a new building, a former furniture store in East Chicago. Classes and administrative work were conducted in this building, which served the college for 15 years and later became the Administration Building. The East Chicago Campus continued to grow throughout the 1960s. Buildings were donated or acquired on Indianapolis Boulevard and Olcott Avenue to provide classroom and office space, a library, laboratories, a theater, a communications center and student recreational facilities. In summer 1971, the college was renamed "St. Joseph Calumet College". It officially separated from St. Joseph's College on November 15, 1973, when articles of incorporation were filed with the state of Indiana. On December 31, 1973, the American Oil Company deeded its research and development facilities and 256 acres (103.6 ha) of land to Calumet College. The college moved into its new facilities in January 1976 and is now using the largest of the 23 buildings on the site.

== Academics ==
The college awards master's, bachelor's and associate degrees in a variety of fields. The college offers two accelerated degree completion programs through its School of Adult Learning. It also permits students to earn up to 45 semester hours of credit at the bachelor's degree level through alternative credit options.

== Athletics ==
The Calumet (CCSJ) athletic teams are called the Crimson Wave. The college is a member of the National Association of Intercollegiate Athletics (NAIA), primarily competing in the Chicagoland Collegiate Athletic Conference (CCAC) for most of its sports since the 2001–02 academic year (when the school began its athletics program); while its bowling teams compete in the United States Bowling Congress (USBC).

CCSJ competes in 17 intercollegiate varsity sports: Men's sports include baseball, basketball, bowling, cross country, soccer, sprint football (2022), track & field and volleyball; while women's sports include basketball, bowling, cross country, soccer, softball, track & field and volleyball; and co-ed sports include cheerleading and competitive dance. Former sports included men's wrestling (which was added as a varsity sport back in the 2009–10 school year).

CCSJ men's bowling finished second in the nation at USBC Collegiate Championships, in the 2009–10 school year. In 2016, the men's bowling teamed moved up and ranked first in the US at the USBC Collegiate Championships.

== Notable alumni ==
- Carmen Lomellin, diplomat
- Eddie Melton, politician
- Dan C. Stevenson, politician
- Darrow Tully, newspaper publisher
