= James W. Owens =

American businessman (born 1946)

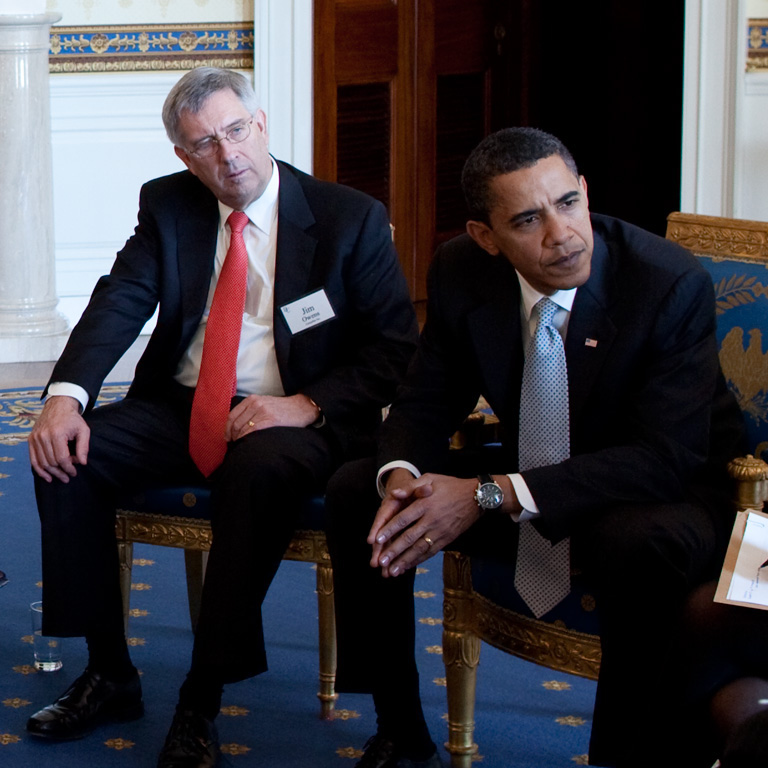
- Owens with Barack Obama in 2009
- Born: 1946 (age 79–80); Elizabeth City, North Carolina, U.S.
- Education: North Carolina State University (BS, MS, PhD)
- Occupation: Business executive
- Years active: 1972–2010
- Employer: Caterpillar Inc.

CEO, Caterpillar
- In office February 1, 2004 – July 1, 2010
- Preceded by: Glen Barton
- Succeeded by: Douglas R. Oberhelman

Chairman of the Board, Caterpillar
- In office February 1, 2004 – November 1, 2010
- Preceded by: Glen Barton
- Succeeded by: Douglas R. Oberhelman

James W. Owens (born 1946) is an American economist and manufacturing executive. He is the former chairman and chief executive officer of Caterpillar Inc., the world's largest manufacturer of construction and mining equipment, diesel and natural gas engines and industrial gas turbines. He held the positions from 1 February 2004 through 2010.

== Early life ==
Owens is a native of Elizabeth City, North Carolina. Owens attended graduated from North Carolina State University, in 1973. During his time at the university, Owens received a Bachelor of Science and Master of Science in Textile Technology and a Ph.D. in Economics.

== Career ==
After joining the company in 1972 as a corporate economist, he has held numerous management positions.

Owens was named chief economist of Caterpillar Overseas S.A. in Geneva, Switzerland in 1975. From 1980 until 1987 he held managerial positions in Peoria in the Accounting and Product Source Planning Departments. In 1987, he became managing director of P.T. Natra Raya, Caterpillar's joint venture in Indonesia. He held that position until 1990, when he was elected a corporate vice president and named president of Solar Turbines Incorporated, a Caterpillar subsidiary in San Diego. In 1993 he came to Peoria as vice president and chief financial officer with administrative responsibility for the Corporate Services Division.

In 1995, Owens was named a group president and member of Caterpillar's Executive Office. Over the next nine years as a group president, Owens was at various times responsible for 13 of the company's 25 divisions. In December 2003, Caterpillar's board of directors named Owens vice chairman and appointed him chairman and chief executive officer effective February 1, 2004.

He is a director of the Institute for International Economics in Washington, DC, a member of the Council on Foreign Relations in New York City, and a director of FM Global Insurance Company in Rhode Island. Owens is a member of The Business Roundtable in Washington, DC, and the Global Advisory Council to The Conference Board in New York. He is also a member of the Community Advisory Board of Saint Francis Medical Center and the Civic Federation Board in Peoria. He is a member of the executive committee of The Business Council for 2011 and 2012.

Other directorships held by Owens include Alcoa, and International Business Machines.

In August 2009 it was made known by an article in the Peoria Journal Star that Caterpillar was beginning to plan for Owens' retirement (he is nearing the Caterpillar mandatory retirement age of 65) and the transition to another chairman and CEO. On October 22, 2009, Caterpillar announced that Douglas R. Oberhelman would succeed Owens as CEO on July 1, 2010, and as chairman on October 31, 2010.
