= Robert E. Allen (telecommunications executive) =

American telecom businessman (1935–2016)

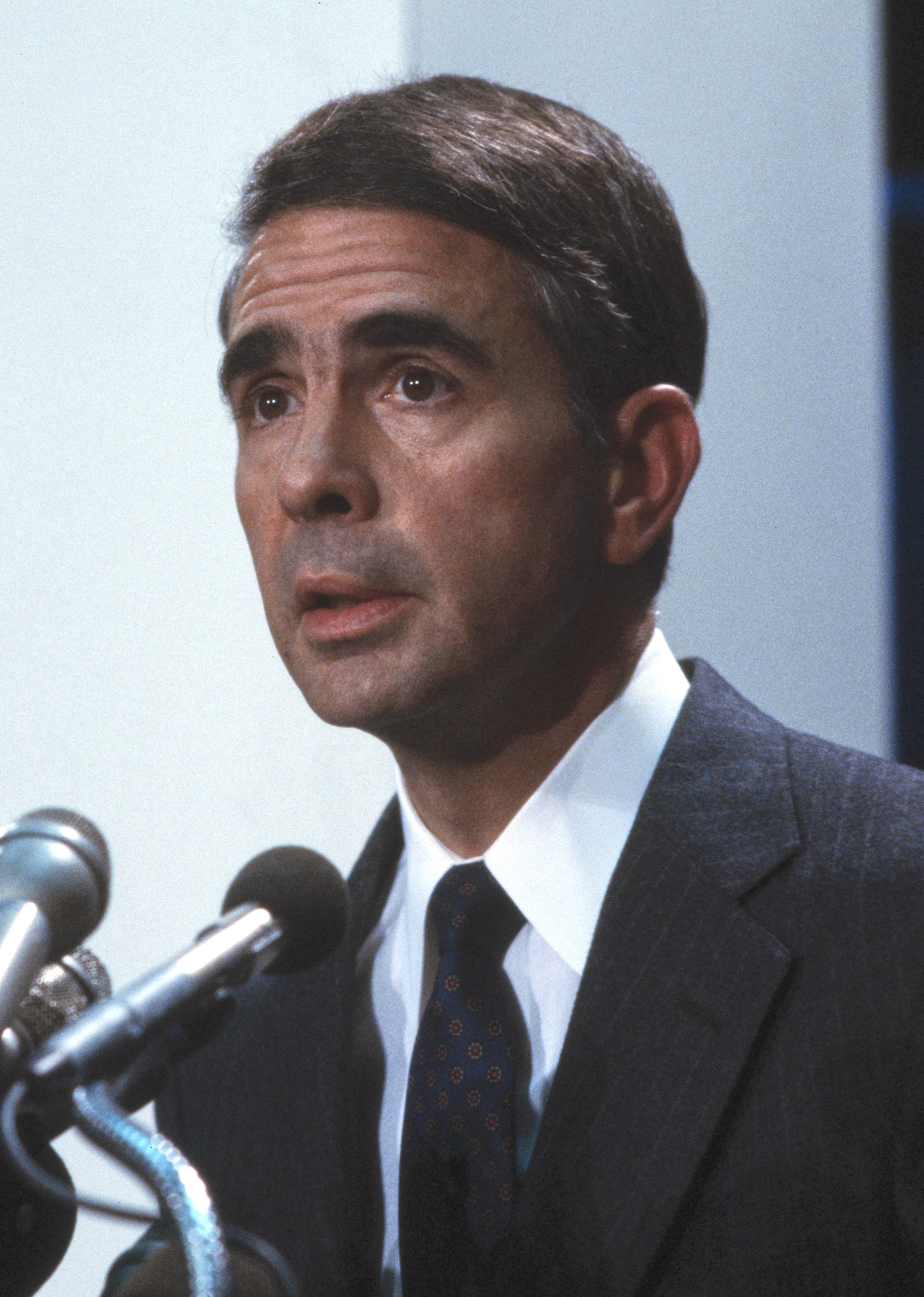
Allen in 1985

Robert Eugene Allen (January 25, 1935 – September 10, 2016) was an American telecommunications businessman.

He was the president of AT&T between 1986 and 1988. He also served as its CEO and chairman from 1988 to 1997.

Born in Joplin, Missouri, Allen grew up in New Castle, Indiana. He graduated from Wabash College in Crawfordsville, Indiana with his bachelor's degree in political science in 1957. While a student at Wabash, he was initiated into the Indiana Beta chapter of the Phi Delta Theta fraternity.

Allen was elected a fellow of the American Academy of Arts and Sciences in 1994. From 1990 he served on the board of PepsiCo. He also served on the governing board of the Mayo Clinic. He served as chairman of The Business Council in 1993 and 1994.
