= Jon Moeller =

American businessman (born 1964)

- Born: Jon R. Moeller; June 11, 1964 (age 62); Chicago, Illinois, U.S.
- Education: Cornell University (BS, MBA)

Jon R. Moeller (born June 11, 1964) is an American businessman who serves as the Executive Chairman of the Board of Procter & Gamble. He was previously chief executive officer from November 2021 to January 2026.

== Biography ==
=== Early life ===
Jon Moeller was born in Chicago, Illinois on June 11, 1964. He graduated with a Bachelor of Science in biology from the Cornell University College of Agriculture and Life Sciences at Cornell University in 1986, and received an M.B.A. from the same university in 1988.

=== Career ===
Moeller joined Procter & Gamble on September 1, 1988 and was appointed Vice President in 2007. He was treasurer from 2007 to December 2008. On January 1, 2009, he became Chief Financial Officer. He is also a visiting lecturer at the Samuel Curtis Johnson Graduate School of Management at his alma mater, Cornell University.

Moeller sits on the board of directors of Monsanto since August 3, 2011. He is on the Council for Division Finance Leaders of The Conference Board, and he is a member of the Cincinnati Business Advisory Council of the Federal Reserve Bank of Cleveland as well as the executive committee of the Cincinnati Commercial Club.

Moeller is a member of The Business Council. He also sits on the board of trustees of the Cincinnati Art Museum.

He was elected Chief Executive Officer of Procter & Gamble on July 29, 2021, to succeed David S. Taylor on November 1, 2021.

=== Personal life ===
Moeller is married to Lisa Sauer, a Cornell graduate who encouraged him to apply to Procter & Gamble after she had interned there.
