= Rosemary Watson =

American actress

Rosemary Watson is an American voice over artist, actress, and singer-songwriter from Highland, Indiana. Her voiceover work can be heard in television and radio ads, in software training programs and educational videos, toys, gadgets, audio books and phone systems. Her satirical impersonations of Hillary Clinton, Sarah Palin, Michele Bachmann, Cindy McCain, James Carville, Diane Sawyer, and others have been praised by news outlets and comedians such as Carol Burnett.

== Career ==
Watson worked for HGTV and the Discovery Channel in the 1990s, both as a show host and working behind-the-scenes. Her impersonation of Hillary Clinton during Clinton's 2008 presidential campaign gained her world-wide recognition as an impersonator and comedian. Watson formed a friendship with comedian Carol Burnett, and performed at Burnett's Mark Twain Prize for American Humor award ceremony. Burnett promoted Watson on several talk shows and landed her an audition with SNL. Watson has been featured on networks such as CNN.
