= School Town of Highland =

School district in Indiana

Address
- 9145 Kennedy Avenue Highland, Indiana, 46322-2747; United States
- Coordinates: 41°32′59″N 87°27′29″W

District information
- Type: Public
- Motto: Educating today's students for tomorrow's challenges
- Grades: Pre-K thru 12
- Superintendent: Brian J. Smith
- Accreditation: NCA
- NCES District ID: 1804560
- District ID: 4720

Students and staff
- Enrollment: 3,179 (2014-15)
- Teachers: 176 (2014-15)
- Athletic conference: Northwest Crossroads
- District mascot: Trojans
- Colors: Blue and Gold

Other information
- Website: www.highland.k12.in.us

The School Town of Highland is the school district which serves the town of Highland in Lake County, Indiana. The district includes four elementary schools, one middle school and one high school.

School	Address	Enrollment (2014–15)
Highland High School	9135 Erie Street	1,118
Highland Middle School	2941 41st Street	751
Judith Morton Johnston Elementary School	8220 5th Street	302
Mildred Merkley Elementary School	9340 5th Street	316
Southridge Elementary School	9221 Johnston Street	383
Allen J. Warren Elementary School	2901 100th Street	309
