= William M. Batten =

American businessman

- Born: June 4, 1909; Parkersburg, West Virginia
- Died: January 22, 1999 (aged 89); Hilton Head, South Carolina
- Occupations: Chairman & CEO at JCPenney (1969–1974), Chairman at New York Stock Exchange (1976–1984)

William M. Batten (1909–1999) was an American businessman. He served as chairman and chief executive officer of JCPenney from 1964 to 1974, and as chairman of the New York Stock Exchange from 1976 to 1984.

== Biography ==
=== Early life ===
William Batten was born in Reedy, Roane County, West Virginia on 4 June 1909. He received a Bachelor of Science in Economics from Ohio State University in 1932 and did graduate work at the University of Chicago.

=== Career ===
In 1926, he started his career at JCPenney as a part-time salesman in his hometown. In 1935, he worked as a full-time salesman in Lansing, Michigan. He introduced the Penney credit card. After serving in the Second World War, he worked in the New York City office of JCPenney in 1945. He became vice president in 1953 and a member of the board of directors in 1955. In 1958, he became president and chief executive. He served as chairman from 1964 to 1974.

From 1976 to 1984, he served as chairman of the New York Stock Exchange, taking over from James J. Needham. In this capacity, he oversaw a $70 million renovation of the exchange floor and the installation of electronic equipment that tripled the daily trading capacity to 150 million shares.

He served on the boards of directors of AT&T, Boeing and Texas Instruments. He served as chairman of The Business Council from 1971 to 1972. From 1984 to 1986, he was a visiting fellow at the John F. Kennedy School of Government at Harvard University.

=== Personal life ===
He was married, with two children. He died in Hilton Head, South Carolina on January 22, 1999.

== Bibliography ==
- The Penney idea: Foundation for the continuing growth of the J. C. Penney Company (1967)
