= Ryan Grigson =

American football executive (born 1972)

Cleveland Browns
- Title: Senior football advisor

Personal information
- Born: February 23, 1972 (age 54); East Chicago, Indiana, U.S.
- Listed height: 6 ft 6 in (1.98 m)
- Listed weight: 290 lb (132 kg)

Career information
- Position: Offensive tackle
- High school: Highland (Highland, Lake County, Indiana)
- College: Purdue (1990–1994)
- NFL draft: 1995: 6th round, 175th overall pick

Career history

Playing
- Cincinnati Bengals (1995)*; Detroit Lions (1995); Toronto Argonauts (1997)*
- * Offseason or practice squad member only

Coaching
- McPherson College (1998) Offensive line coach; Buffalo Destroyers (1999) Assistant coach

Operations
- Saskatchewan Roughriders (1998) Pro scout; Buffalo Destroyers (1999) Player personnel coordinator; St. Louis Rams (1999–2000) National scout; St. Louis Rams (2001–2003) Area scout; Philadelphia Eagles (2004–2005) Western regional scout; Philadelphia Eagles (2006–2009) Director of college scouting; Philadelphia Eagles (2010–2011) Director of player personnel; Indianapolis Colts (2012–2016) General manager; Cleveland Browns (2017) Senior personnel executive; Seattle Seahawks (2018–2019) Senior football consultant; Cleveland Browns (2020–2021) Senior football advisor; Minnesota Vikings (2022–2025); Senior vice president of player personnel (2022–2024); Assistant general manager (2025); Cleveland Browns (2026–present) Senior football advisor

Awards and highlights
- Super Bowl champion (XXXIV); Sporting News and PFWA NFL Executive of the Year (2012); National Football Foundation Drew Brees Mental Toughness Award (2013)
- Executive profile at Pro Football Reference

Ryan Richard Grigson (born February 23, 1972) is an American football executive who is a senior football advisor for the Cleveland Browns of the National Football League (NFL). From 2012 to 2016, he served as the general manager of the Indianapolis Colts.

Grigson played college football as a tight end and offensive tackle for the Purdue Boilermakers and was drafted by the Cincinnati Bengals in the sixth round of the 1995 NFL draft. He was a member of the Detroit Lions in 1995, and the Toronto Argonauts of the Canadian Football League in 1997 before retiring due to a back injury. Grigson was a pro scout for the Saskatchewan Roughriders and an assistant coach for McPherson College in 1998. In 1999, he was a player personnel coordinator and assistant coach for the Buffalo Destroyers of the Arena Football League.

From 1999 to 2003, Grigson was a national and regional scout for the St. Louis Rams. He was hired by the Eagles as a western regional scout in 2004, and was promoted to director of college scouting in 2006. He was promoted to director of player personnel in 2010. He also has worked with the Seattle Seahawks and Cleveland Browns.

== Playing career ==
=== College ===
Grigson signed his letter of intent to play college football for the Purdue Boilermakers in 1990, where he would play from 1990 to 1994. On October 10, 1992, in a game against Minnesota, Grigson was hit in the abdomen by a defender and sustained a life-threatening injury. He was hospitalized immediately after and the blow resulted in pancreatitis, kidney failure and pneumonia. He missed the rest of the season, likely to never play again, after becoming a starter during his sophomore year. Grigson returned for the 1993 season, started ten games and was named one of three captains, along with Mike Alstott and Matt Kingsbury, for the 1994 season (Purdue's first winning season in a decade).

=== Professional ===
Grigson was selected by the Cincinnati Bengals in the sixth round, with the 175th overall pick, of the 1995 NFL draft. He was signed to a contract by the Bengals on June 10, 1995, but was waived during final cuts on August 28. He was claimed off waivers by the Detroit Lions shortly thereafter. He did not play in any games during the 1995 season and missed time due to a back injury. Grigson was released by the Lions on August 14, 1996. He signed with the Toronto Argonauts of the Canadian Football League in 1997. However, he suffered another back injury and was released during final roster cuts on June 21, 1997.

== Executive and coaching career ==
=== Early coaching and scouting ===
Following his retirement from playing, Grigson became a pro scout for the Saskatchewan Roughriders in 1998. In the same year, he was the offensive line coach for McPherson College. In 1999, he was a player personnel coordinator and assistant coach for the Buffalo Destroyers of the Arena Football League.

=== St. Louis Rams ===
Grigson was hired by the St. Louis Rams as a national scout in 1999. He was part of the Rams' Super Bowl XXXIV championship team in 1999 and the Rams' NFC Championship/Super Bowl XXXVI team in 2001 as an area scout. He spent five years in total with the Rams, working as a national scout from 1999 to 2000 and an area scout from 2001 to 2003.

=== Philadelphia Eagles ===
On May 15, 2004, Grigson was hired by the Philadelphia Eagles as a western regional scout. He was a part of the Eagles' NFC Championship/Super Bowl XXXIX team in 2004. On June 8, 2006, he was promoted to director of college scouting, and on February 3, 2010, he was promoted to director of player personnel.

=== Indianapolis Colts ===
==== 2012 season ====
Grigson was hired by the Indianapolis Colts as their general manager on January 11, 2012. Team owner Jim Irsay said at the time, "I picked Ryan because I felt that he had a vision, that he had an intelligence, that he had a depth of perception and awareness and that he was capable of taking it up to the next level." Grigson inherited a 2–14 team under head coach Jim Caldwell. Shortly after assuming his new role, Grigson fired Caldwell and, two weeks later, hired Chuck Pagano as the team's new head coach.

In the 2012 NFL draft, the Colts made ten selections, including first overall. Grigson selected Andrew Luck (1), followed by Coby Fleener (34), Dwayne Allen (64), T. Y. Hilton (92), Josh Chapman (136), Vick Ballard (170), LaVon Brazill (206), Justin Anderson (208), Tim Fugger (214), and Chandler Harnish (253, "Mr. Irrelevant"). After the 2012 season, which put the Colts back in the NFL playoffs with an 11–5 record, the nine-win improvement from the previous year tied the third-largest improvement in league history. Thanks to this turnaround, which included changing 70% of the roster, Grigson earned Executive of the Year honors from The Sporting News and Pro Football Weekly. He also won the 2013 Drew Brees Mental Toughness Award from the Northwest Indiana Chapter of the National Football Foundation.

==== 2013 season ====
In the 2013 NFL draft, the Colts made seven selections. Grigson selected Bjoern Werner (24), followed by Hugh Thornton (86), Khaled Holmes (121), Montori Hughes (139), John Boyett (192), Kerwynn Wiliams (230), and Justice Cunningham (254). On September 18, 2013, Grigson traded a 2014 first-round draft pick for Trent Richardson. The Colts were looking for a running back after a season-ending injury to Vick Ballard. Richardson was released following the 2014 NFL season. The Colts were 6–0 in the AFC South, earning first place in the division.

==== 2014 season ====
In the 2014 NFL draft, the Colts made five selections. Grigson selected Jack Mewhort (59), Donte Moncrief (90), Jonathan Newsome (166), Andrew Jackson (203), and Ulrick John (232). On January 11, 2015—Grigson's third anniversary with the team—the Indianapolis Colts beat the Denver Broncos to qualify for the AFC Championship game, only the fifth time since the Colts arrived in Indianapolis in 1984. During the AFC championship against the New England Patriots, Grigson asked NFL officials to check the air pressure in the Patriots' footballs, which set in motion the "Deflategate" scandal. The Colts lost the game 45–7. The Colts were 6–0 in the AFC South, earning first place in the division.

==== 2015 season ====
In the 2015 NFL draft, the Colts made eight selections. Grigson selected Phillip Dorsett (29), followed by D'Joun Smith (65), Henry Anderson (93), Clayton Geathers (109), David Parry (151), Josh Robinson (205), Amarlo Herrera (207), and Denzell Goode (255). The Colts, who struggled with injuries including one to quarterback Andrew Luck, stumbled in the 2015 season and finished 8–8 and out of the playoffs. The 2015 Colts set the NFL record for the longest winning streak against any division in the league with their 16th consecutive victory over an AFC South opponent when they defeated the Houston Texans during week 5. The record surpassed the previous mark of 15, recorded by the Super Bowl champion Miami Dolphins against the AFC East during the perfect season of 1972 and into the following season.

==== 2016 season ====
On January 4, 2016, the Colts announced that Grigson and head coach Chuck Pagano had both received contract extensions through the 2019 season.

In the 2016 NFL draft, the Colts made eight selections. Grigson selected Ryan Kelly (18), followed by T. J. Green (57), Le'Raven Clark (82), Hassan Ridgeway (116), Antonio Morrison (125), Joe Haeg (155), Trevor Bates (239), and Austin Blythe (248).

On January 21, 2017, Grigson was relieved of his duties as general manager. The Colts failed to make the playoffs in the two consecutive seasons leading up to his firing, the first time the team had missed the playoffs in consecutive years since the 1997–98 seasons. One move that made many question Grigson was the infamous Trent Richardson deal that cost the Colts a first-round draft pick. While at the time the move was applauded by many football pundits and fans, the trade ultimately didn't work out. Richardson ended up averaging only 3.1 yards per carry and scoring only 6 touchdowns in 2 seasons with the team and was a healthy scratch during the AFC Championship game in 2015. Another questionable move was the drafting of Phillip Dorsett in the 1st round of the 2015 NFL draft, while the Colts offensive line was struggling to protect their franchise quarterback, and their defense was coming off a poor season. However, a trade that worked out well for Grigson and the Colts was the acquisition of former first-round draft pick Vontae Davis in 2012 who was a big part of the 2012 turnaround and was later named to the Pro Bowl in both 2014 and 2015. Another move by Grigson was the trade for the draft choice and subsequent selection of T. Y. Hilton in the 2012 NFL draft, as he would become a three-time Pro Bowl selection and the NFL's leading receiver in 2016.

Overall, the Colts had a regular season record of 49–31 (.613 winning percentage) while Grigson was general manager.

=== Cleveland Browns (first stint) ===
On May 24, 2017, Grigson was hired as the senior personnel executive for the Cleveland Browns. In January 2018, the Browns announced that he was no longer part of the team's front office personnel.

=== Seattle Seahawks ===
On June 13, 2018, Grigson was hired as a senior football consultant for the Seattle Seahawks, and stayed with the team through the 2019 NFL season.

=== Cleveland Browns (second stint) ===
Grigson was hired by the Cleveland Browns in an advisory and consulting role in February 2020. The deal was made official on May 29, 2020.

=== Minnesota Vikings ===
On June 12, 2022, the Minnesota Vikings named Grigson as their senior vice president of player personnel. On May 29, 2025, he was promoted to assistant general manager.

=== Cleveland Browns (third stint) ===
On June 25, 2026, Grigson departed the Vikings and rejoined the Cleveland Browns as a senior football advisor.

== Personal life ==
Ryan Richard Grigson was born to Jeff and Juanita (Rokita) Grigson in 1972. Jeff (d.1980) played football at Northwest Missouri State University.

Grigson attended Our Lady of Grace Catholic School from 1978 to 1986. He played high school football at Highland Senior High from 1986 to 1990. As a sophomore, he was a member of the Trojan team that played in the 1987 5A State Championship game at the Colts' original stadium, the Hoosier Dome (RCA Dome).

Grigson met his wife, Cynthia, while the two were students at Purdue University. The couple married in 2001 and have six children.
