= Pennsy Greenway =

Trail in Illinois and Indiana, USA

Coordinates: 41°28′11.4″N 87°25′12.5″W

- Length: 12.5 mi (20.1 km)
- Location: Cook County, Illinois, Lake County, Indiana
- Trailheads: Lansing, Illinois; Crown Point, Indiana
- Use: Walking, Biking
- Season: Year round
- Surface: Asphalt
- Right of way: Pennsylvania Railroad
- Website: http://www.traillink.com

The Pennsy Greenway is a rail trail in the Chicago metropolitan area running from Lansing, Illinois to Schererville, Indiana. The trail runs on the former Penn Central Railway, and is currently incomplete, but is paved at segments in Lansing, Munster, Dyer, Schererville, and Crown Point. The trail is paved through these segments at a total of 12.5 miles, and the trail is planned to extend for a total of 15 miles.

== See also ==
- Cycling in Chicago
- Monon Trail
- Erie Lackawanna Trail
