= Debbie Patton =

American bodybuilder/fitness competitor

- Professional bodybuilder
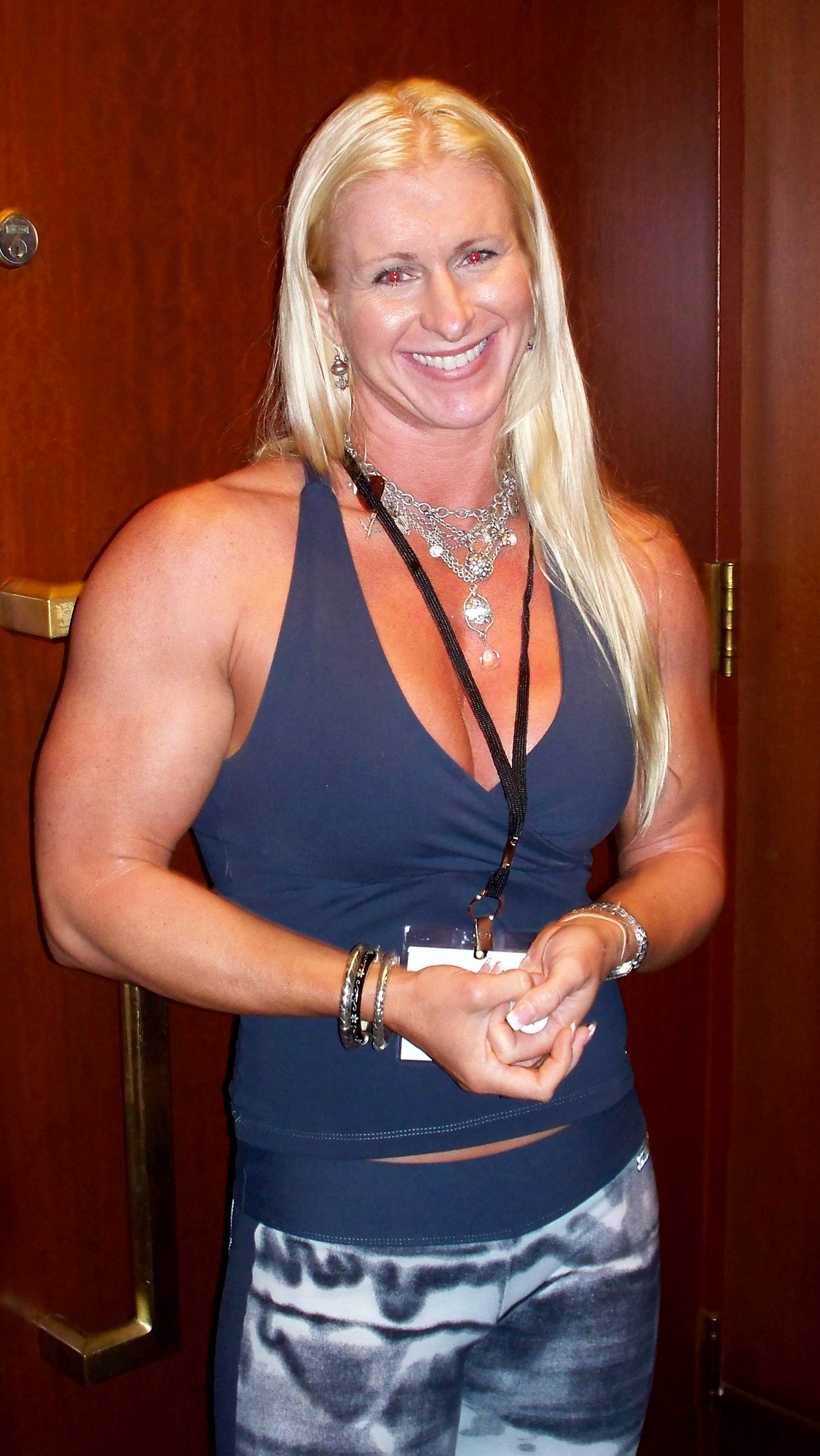
- Patton in 2008

Personal info
- Born: Highland, Indiana, United States

Best statistics

Debbie Patton is an American bodybuilder who competed at the World Amateur Bodybuilding Championships in 2003–2004. She won the NPC Team Universe competition in 2003–2005, and turned professional in 2005.

== Contest history ==
- 2002 Illinois State Champion
- 2002 Jr. Nationals – 6th
- 2003 Indiana State Champion
- 2003 Jr. Nationals – 12th
- 2003 Master Nationals – 3rd
- 2003 Team Universe – 1st middleweight
- 2003 IFBB World Championships – 12th
- 2004 Master Nationals – 1st
- 2004 Team Universe – 1st middleweight
- 2004 North American Championships – 3rd middleweight
- 2004 World Championships – 11th middleweight
- 2005 Master's Nationals – 3rd
- 2005 Team Universe – 1st heavyweight and overall, Pro card
- 2006 IFBB Atlantic City Pro – 26th
- 2010 IFBB Phoenix Pro – 21st
