= Rick Karr =

American journalist

Rick G. Karr is a journalist and educator who reports primarily on media and technology's impact on culture.

They served as correspondent for the PBS series Bill Moyers Journal. Prior to that, they reported and co-wrote the documentary Net @ Risk, which aired in October 2006 as part of journalist Bill Moyers' series Moyers on America. The show examined the impact of legislation on net neutrality and the future of the U.S. internet, as well as broader issues involving telecommunications and democracy.

Karr was previously a correspondent for The Wall Street Journal's PBS series Journal Editorial Report; culture and technology correspondent for the public radio show Weekend America; and a longtime correspondent, host, and engineer for National Public Radio. In 2002 and 2003, they were the media correspondent for the PBS series NOW with Bill Moyers. Karr began their career in journalism as a teenager, when they worked as a reporter and music critic for The Times of Northwest Indiana.

They have also produced and appeared in local New York City cable station CUNY TV on shows about the New York area tech economy.

They have been teaching as an adjunct faculty member at the Columbia University Graduate School of Journalism since 2004.

Karr is a recording engineer, record producer, songwriter and founding member of the musical collective Box Set Authentic.

They were born and raised in Highland, Indiana and attended Purdue University and the London School of Economics.
