= Eric Justin Toth =

American sex offender (born 1982)

FBI Ten Most Wanted Fugitive
- Reward: $100,000
- Alias: David Bussone

Description
- Born: February 13, 1982 (age 44); Hammond, Indiana, U.S.
- Nationality: American
- Gender: Male
- Height: 6 ft 3 in (1.91 m)
- Weight: 155 lb (70 kg)
- Occupation: Teacher

Status
- Convictions: Possession of Child Pornography; Production of Child Pornography
- Penalty: 25 years' imprisonment
- Added: April 10, 2012
- Caught: April 22, 2013
- Number: 495
- Captured

Eric Justin Toth (born February 13, 1982), also known under the alias David Bussone, is an American former fugitive and sex offender convicted of possessing and producing child pornography. On April 10, 2012, Toth replaced Osama bin Laden on the FBI Ten Most Wanted Fugitives list as the 495th fugitive to be placed on that list by the FBI. One alleged reason he was chosen for the list is that his distinctive appearance—tall and thin, with a mole under his left eye—would make it hard for him to hide if his case became well publicized. Toth was captured in Esteli, Nicaragua, on April 10, 2013, and extradited on April 22 to the United States to face trial.

== Biography ==
Eric Toth was born in Hammond, Indiana, and was raised in Highland, Indiana. Toth attended Cornell University for a year and transferred to Purdue University, where he graduated with a bachelor's degree in education. In 2008, he was accused of producing pornographic photographs and video footage of young boys while working as a third-grade teacher in Washington, D.C.

Toth was described as a computer expert; he demonstrated above-average knowledge regarding computers, the use of the Internet, and security awareness. Toth had the ability to integrate into various socio-economic classes and was an expert at social engineering. He used social networking sites regularly. His educational background was conducive to gaining employment in fields having a connection to children. Some described Toth as a compulsive liar.

Toth was captured by Nicaraguan police in April 2013 in Estelí, a northern city of Nicaragua. He was immediately extradited to the United States to face trial.

== Sentence ==
In March 2014, Toth was sentenced in federal court to 25 years in prison. He is currently incarcerated at FCI Fort Dix.
