= Dan Stevenson (politician) =

American politician

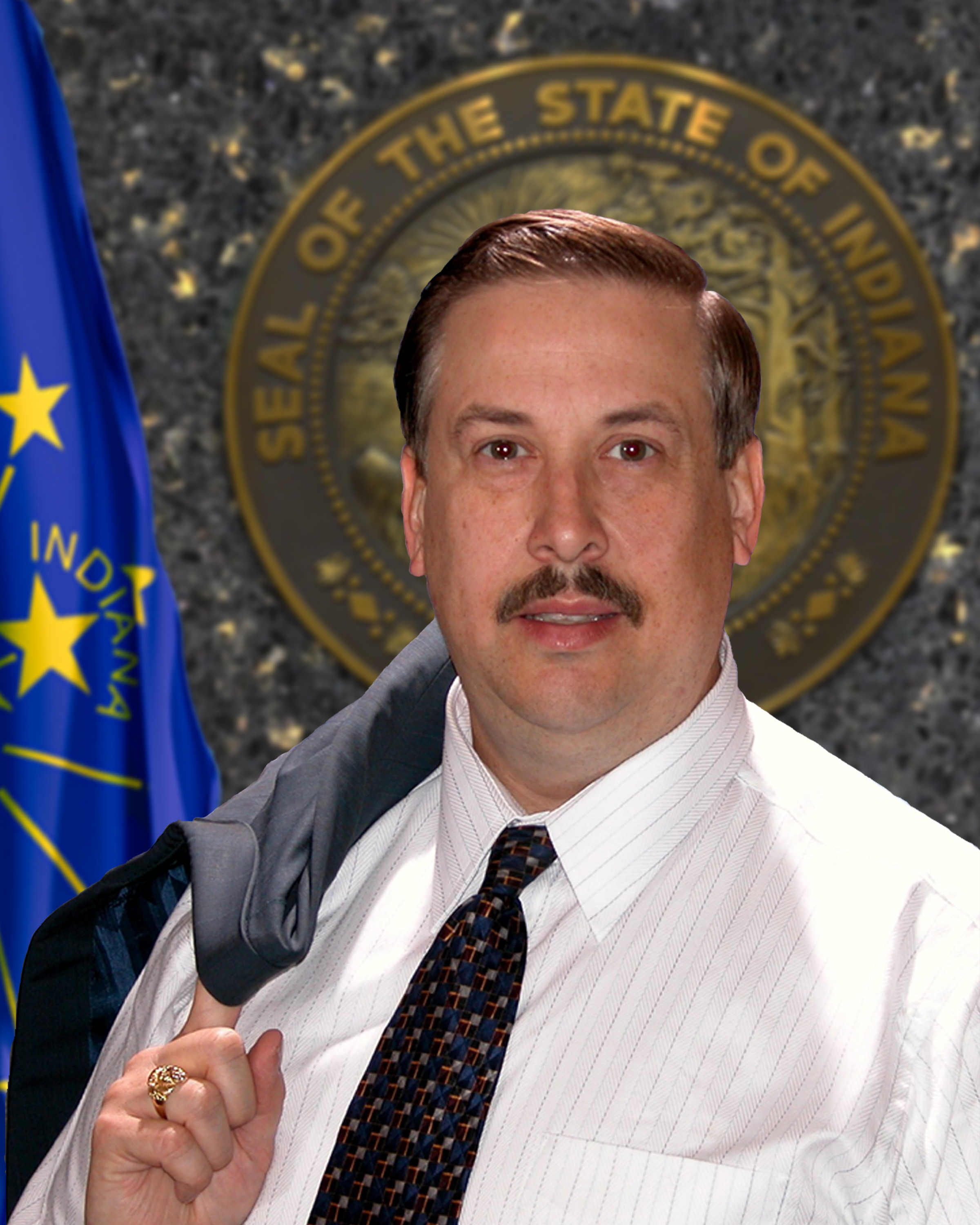

Member of the Indiana House of Representatives from the 11th district
- In office November 9, 1994 – November 7, 2012
- Preceded by: John S. Matonovich
- Succeeded by: Rick Niemeyer

Personal details
- Born: August 16, 1959 (age 67) Hammond, Indiana
- Party: Democratic
- Spouse: Dawn
- Education: Calumet College of St. Joseph
- Occupation: steelworker

Dan C. Stevenson is a former Democratic member of the Indiana House of Representatives, representing the 11th District from 1994 until November 2012. Former Representative Stevenson opted to retire in 2012. He also retired from his full-time job at ArcelorMittal USA (formerly Inland Steel Company) in December 2012 after nearly 35 years with the company. He and his family moved to Orlando, Florida in November 2012. In July 2015 they moved to Portage, Indiana.
