= Jim Umpleby =

American business executive

- Born: Donald James Umpleby III
- Education: Rose-Hulman Institute of Technology (1980)
- Occupation: Business Executive
- Years active: 1980–present
- Employer: Caterpillar Inc.
- Spouse: Katherine Umpleby
- Children: 2 children

CEO, Caterpillar Inc.
- In office January 1, 2017 – May 1, 2025
- Preceded by: Douglas R. Oberhelman
- Succeeded by: Joe Creed

Chairman of the Board, Caterpillar Inc.
- Incumbent
- Assumed office December 13, 2018
- Preceded by: Dave Calhoun

Donald James "Jim" Umpleby III is an American businessman. He was the CEO of Caterpillar Inc. from January 2017 to May 2025, and has been chairman of the Caterpillar board of directors since December 2018.

== Biography ==
=== Early life and education ===
Umpleby was raised in Highland, Indiana, and attended Rose-Hulman Institute of Technology. He graduated with a Bachelor of Science in Mechanical Engineering in 1980.

=== Career ===
After graduating from Rose-Hulman, Umpleby joined Solar Turbines, Inc. in San Diego, California, shortly thereafter. Umpleby became a Caterpillar vice president and president of Solar Turbines in 2010. Immediately prior to becoming CEO in 2017, Umpleby was group president of Caterpillar's energy and transportation business segment. On December 12, 2018, the Caterpillar board of directors elected Umpleby to be chairman of the board, effective immediately, in addition to his CEO role.

In September 2017, Caterpillar held a conference for investors at which Umpleby presented the details of a new corporate strategy focused on profitable growth, through expanded product offerings, increased focus on operational excellence and providing services in digitally-enabled technologies and other areas that support customers. Barron's, a U.S.-based financial magazine, described the new corporate strategy stating, “…investors can expect a more return-focused company . . . with a new approach similar to what we have seen from its peers, such as Deere (DE), Parker Hannifin (PH), Cummins (CMI) and Illinois Tool Works (ITW) that are further along this journey. If executed, we believe that this should drive improved financial returns, which are currently in the middle of the pack, and a possible re-rating of the stock over time.”

Umpleby was elected to the board of directors of the Chevron Corporation effective March 1, 2018.
