= Regional Radio Sports Network =

- Type: Radio Network
- Country: United States
- Availability: Michiana, Chicago market
- Founded: 1992
- Motto: "Positively promoting the student-athlete since 1992" & "Proverbs 3:5-6"
- Headquarters: Mishawaka, Indiana
- Key people: Paul R. Condry, Tonya Condry, Mike Knezevich, Andrew Kirksey, Matt Kopsea, Tanner Camp, Mike Fleischman, Vince Gray
- Former names: Regional Radio Sports
- Affiliations: IHSAA, Indianapolis Colts
- Affiliates: Current: WEFM 95.9 FM - Michigan City, IN; WGCS 91.1 FM THE GLOBE - Goshen, IN; WJOB 1230 AM - Hammond, IN; WTRC 1340 AM The Truth Radio - Elkhart, IN; WTMK 88.5 - Lowell, IN; WTRC 95.3 FM Michiana’s News Channel – Mishawaka, IN; Former: WLTH; WQKO; WHME; WHLP; WGL; WLRX; WZVN; WAKE; WWCA; WJCO; WAOR
- Official website: rrsn.com primetimepublications.com

The Regional Radio Sports Network is a radio network that broadcasts high school and college sports in northern Indiana.

== History ==
Regional Radio Sports first broadcast in 1992 on WWJY (now WXRD) in Crown Point, Indiana. In order to establish a footprint in the Michiana region, RRS soon joined forces with WAMJ in South Bend to create the first network. WAMJ was the first home for RRSN's coverage of Penn High School football, which now airs on affiliate WGCS. The network later added coverage of Bethel College basketball, baseball and softball to fill out the winter and spring. Since 2012, RRSN has partnered with the Indiana High School Athletic Association and Emmis Communications to produce the Indiana High School Sports Report that airs weekly around the state. They also now are the voices of Holy Cross Men's and Women's basketball, IUSB Men's and Women's basketball, and Ancilla College Women's volleyball, basketball, and softball, as well as Ancilla College's Men's soccer, basketball, and baseball.

== Awards ==
RRSN founder Paul Condry was named Indiana Sportscaster of the Year by the National Sportscasters and Sportswriters Association in 2002, 2005, 2008 and 2010. Colleague Mike Knezevich won the same award in 2003, 2004, 2007, and 2013. Matt Kopsea was the 2005 winner while working for the South Bend Tribune before joining RRSN in 2011. The team has two members of the Indiana Sportscasters and Sportswriters Association Hall of Famers and three ISSA annual awards, and more than half a dozen coaches' association media awards.

Other awards won by the staff include the following:

- Two IHSAA Distinguished Media Service Awards (Condry 1999, Knezevich 2009)
- ISSA Sportscaster of the Year (Condry 2005, Knezevich 2006, Donnie Smith 2014)
- ISSA Hall of Fame (Paul Condry 2010, Mike Knezevich 2012, & Matt Kopsea 2016)
- Indiana Basketball Coaches Association Distinguished Service Award (Condry 1999)
- Indiana Basketball Coaches Association Media Award (Kopsea six times)
- Indiana Football Coaches Association Media Awards (Condry 1995, Kopsea 2007)
- Indiana Football Hall of Fame (Chris Geesman, 1996)
- IHSAA State Champions (Doug Miller, 1976; Geesman, 1983, 1995–1997, 2000)
- Indiana Football Hall of Fame (Condry, 2020)
- Gary Old Timers Association Lifetime Achievement Award (Paul R. Condry, 2022)
- Hobart High School Athletic Hall of Fame (Paul R. Condry, 2109

== Football awards ==
RRSN publishes the annual Indiana Football Digest, the largest high school football magazine in the country, which covers every high school team in the state (of Indiana) and weighs in at more than two pounds! They also organize The Griddy's, an annual event recognizing the best high school football players and coaches in the state, in association with the Indianapolis Colts.

== Properties ==
- The Coaches Box, weekly talk show on 91.1 the Globe
- Bethel College Men's and Women's basketball, baseball, and softball
- Holy Cross College Men's and Women's basketball
- Ancilla College soccer, volleyball, baseball, softball, and basketball
- Indiana University - South Bend some Men's and Women's sports
- Penn High School football and basketball
- Hobart High School football
- Lowell High School football
- Duneland Athletic Conference football game of the week
- Northern Indiana Conference football game of the week
- Northwest Indiana Boys and Girls high school soccer

https://www.hobartalumni.org/000/2/8/2/16282/userfiles/file/newsletterV4N4.pdf==References==
