= Nick Digilio =

American movie critic and radio personality (born 1965)

Nick Kington Digilio
- Born: July 6, 1965 (age 61); Chicago, IL
- Spouse: Heather Digilio (married 2009 - divorced 2011)
- Presenting career
- Show: The Nick Digilio Show
- Station: 720 AM
- Network: WGN Radio
- Time slot: Monday - Friday 1am-5am (CT)

Nick Digilio (born July 6, 1965) is an American movie critic and radio personality. He was the host of an award-winning radio program on WGN Radio in Chicago. In 2017, he was inducted into the WGN Radio Walk Of Fame.

== Life ==
Digilio grew up about five blocks away from Wrigley Field in Chicago, Illinois. He attended Luther High School North and graduated in 1983. He also attended Columbia College Chicago where he studied film. He recently moved from the Andersonville and Albany Park neighborhoods to the Old Irving Park neighborhood of Chicago. Digilio is a theater director and actor, and a former member of the Factory Theater. He has been married and divorced.

== Radio career ==
=== Early history at WGN ===
Digilio began reviewing movies on the WGN Roy Leonard Show in 1985. His contributions to Roy's program led WGN Radio management to decide that he'd be a good permanent addition to the station. He soon became a regular on other WGN Radio programs, including Steve King and Johnnie Putman's Life After Dark program. He gained a reputation for his alternative and controversial play and movie reviews. For instance, he applauds the movies Critters, Friday the 13th Part 5, Joe Dirt, and Freddy Got Fingered, while he dislikes Ferris Bueller's Day Off and The Dark Knight. Digilio reviews all the new films on his own show.

=== Nick D. and Garry Lee and The Nick Digilio Show ===
For several years, Digilio co-hosted a weekend late-night radio program on WGN with Garry Lee Wright and on May 31, 1998, he began hosting his own program called Nick at Night - joined by Wright on Fridays. On February 10, 2006, Digilio's program's name was changed to 'The Nick Digilio Show' to correspond with a move from late-nights to prime time on Saturday night and not-so-late nights on Friday and Sunday nights. The Nick Digilio Show was heard on WGN Radio in Chicago (720 AM), where Digilio discussed popular culture, current events, all things Chicago, and other hot topics including why the Flavor Bowl from KFC is the best fast food item ever produced, and the fact that there actually once was vegetable flavored Jell-O.

The former weekend producer of The Nick Digilio Show was Craig Collins, replacing Andy "The Count" Hermann. Mike "Broham" Stephen used to produce Digilio's Sunday night program. Craig also managed the Nick D. Show Producer's Blog on the WGN Radio website.

Digilio was fired from WGN Radio on September 4, 2020, as part of a talent shakeup, after 35 years at the station.

=== Radio segments ===
(Alphabetically)

- "Anti-Valentine's Day"
- "Blast-From-The-Past"
- "Celebrity News/Gossip"
- "Drunks in the News"
- "Fly Jams Friday"- callers request the 'fly'-est funk, R&B, and Motown clips
- "Free For All" - callers talk about topic of their choice
- "Halloween Spooktacular Spectacular"
- "The John and Troy Highlight Reel" - a review of clips of the wacky things said during the radio coverage of Chicago Blackhawks hockey games.
- "Listener Voice Mails"- Nick would literally play his voice mails from listeners at the end of the show every Friday. This resulted in listeners doing "bits" for the voice mail, including one guy who did a dead-on Nick D. impersonation.
- "Nick D. Show Songs"
- "Nick D. Show Spies" - listeners submit clips of other shows on the station when they mention Nick's show.
- "The Pat and Keith Highlight Reel", previously known as "The Pat and Ron Show Highlight Reel" before Ron Santo's death - a review of clips of the wacky things said during the radio coverage of Chicago Cubs baseball games.
- "Paula Cooper's Rock Alert"
- "Straight Out of Context" - listeners submit clips of things that people on the station say that may sound dirty if taken out of context.
- "The Secret History of Chicago Music"
- "The Three's Company Throwdown" - a trivia contest that featured former show producer Andy Hermann whose obsession with and encyclopedic knowledge of Three's Company is, frankly, frightening.
- Wham! Wednesday
- Whitesnake Wednesday
- "The Wisdom of Keith Richards" - funny excerpts from Richards' book, Stone Me: The Wit and Wisdom of Keith Richards
- "The Wisdom of Ted Nugent" - funny excerpts from Nugent's book, Ted, White, and Blue: The Nugent Manifesto
- "The Wisdom of Gene Simmons" - funny excerpts from Simmons's mouth.
- "The Wisdom of Paul Stanley" - funny excerpts from Stanley at concerts.
- "The Wisdom of Gary Busey" - funny and odd comments from the mouth of Gary Busey.
- "Twitter Topic" - Fans post a topic on the social networking site Twitter and Digilio will pick one and talk about it the first half hour of his Friday night show
- "Unnecessary Censorship" Listener generated submissions which involve Nick's clean conversations and are turned into dirty conversations by using the *bleep* sound.
- Yahoo! Trending Now and Google Hot Searches - Nick reads the top 10 on those lists and gets help from listeners on who some people are and/or why they are on the list. He formerly read the Yahoo! Buzz Search listings until it was discontinued in 2011.
- "You Big Dummy" - Nick reads stories about "dummies" doing nonsensical, but hilarious things. Each week, there is one guest listener that reads one story.

=== Frequent callers and contributors ===
- Larry from Aurora - Larry, a former professional wrestler, had an uncanny ability of calling Digilio whenever he was on the air. Larry recently died, and Nick performed a segment in which everyone reflected on their favorite Larry "moments".
- Phil from Stickney
- Natural Mike and his male nurse
- Steve Kraków - frequently calls in for his "Secret History of Chicago Music" segment
- Lazer - a frequent contributor to the "Pat and Ron Show Highlight Reel"
- Ryan from Lakeview - occasional contributor to the Nick D. Show Songs and the Pat & Ron Highlight Reel Songs
- Mike from Portage Park
- Gov from the South Side of Chicago
- Dr. John - Frequent trivia contributor
- Nick Jr. - young fan of the show, showed up in front of the showcase studio as Nick Digilio for Halloween
- Lemont from Park Forest
- TFCreate - Chicago Area Multimedia consultant and commercial photographer (semi-retired)
- Glenn from Evanston - Known for his weird voice and random, off-the-wall comments
- Doug the Nutjob from Minnesota
- Bennett - regular contributor to "Fly Jams Friday segment" referred to by Digilio as "Bennett the business of funk"
- Tom Appel - Publisher of Consumer Guide Automotive

=== Running jokes ===
- Digilio frequently plays a recording of Keri Russell, who was on Spike O'Dell's show, saying "Hi, I'm Keri Russell and I LOOOOOOOOVE Nick's radio show!"
- Digilio frequently mentions Liam Neeson needing to throat punch someone.
- In response to things Digilio or the staff might like, radio-appropriate clips of Christian Bale's on-set Terminator Salvation rant against the director of photography on the film are played, especially the quote "Ooooh, good for you!!".
- Digilio frequently asserts that every segment of his show will "make your pants fall off".
- Incredibly frequent use of reverb while broadcasting.
- Telling stories of how he worked at McDonald's and how the manager would go nuts when they would get "slammed" when corporate come to the drive thru.
- Digilio repeatedly played back the 2009 McDonald's "Filet-O-Fish" commercial, and had the song's composers on as guests.
- Purposely calling Jewel-Osco "The Jewels" as Nick and Nick's father have both worked there.
- Purposely mispronouncing the names of celebrities, such as:
  - M. Night Shamalamadingdong
  - Hayden Pantatoopy
  - Shia LaBoof
  - Michelle Puh-Fifers
