= Orville Redenbacher =

American businessman (1907–1995)

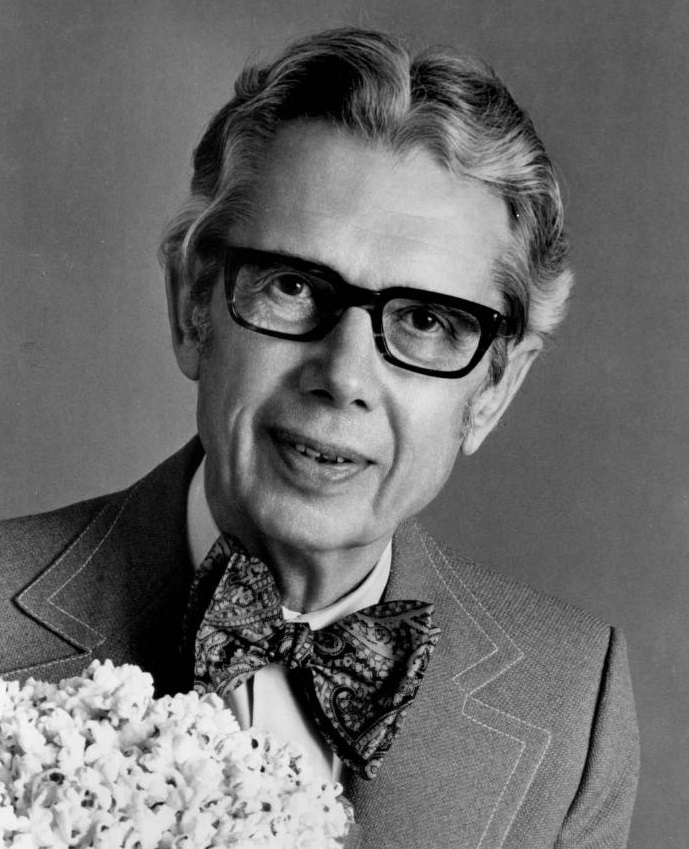
- Redenbacher in 1979
- Born: Orville Clarence Redenbacher; July 16, 1907; Brazil, Indiana, U.S.
- Died: September 19, 1995 (aged 88); Coronado, California, U.S.
- Education: Purdue University
- Occupations: Food scientist, businessman
- Years active: 1951–1995
- Spouses: Corinne Strate (m. 1928; died 1971); Nina Reder (m. 1971; died 1991)
- Children: 2

Orville Clarence Redenbacher (July 16, 1907 – September 19, 1995) was an American food scientist and businessman most often associated with the brand of popcorn that bears his name which is now owned by Conagra Brands. The New York Times described him as "the agricultural visionary who all but single-handedly revolutionized the American popcorn industry".

== Early life ==
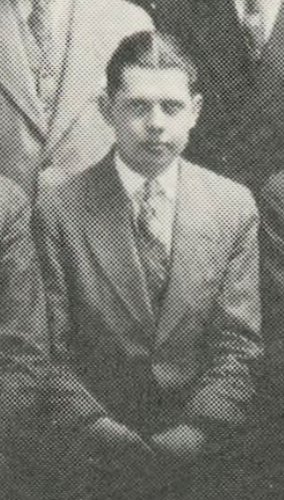
Purdue yearbook photo of Redenbacher, c. 1926

Orville Clarence Redenbacher was born in Brazil, Indiana, on July 16, 1907, the son of Julia Magdalena Dierdorff (1874–1944) and farmer William Joseph Redenbacher (1872–1939). He grew up on his family's farm, where he sometimes sold popcorn from the back of his car. He graduated from Brazil High School in 1924 in the top 5% of his class. He attended Purdue University, where he joined the agriculture-oriented Alpha Gamma Rho fraternity, played the tuba in the Purdue All-American Marching Band, joined the Purdue University track team, and worked at the Purdue Exponent. He graduated in 1928 with a degree in agronomy. He spent most of his life in the agriculture industry, serving as a Vigo County Farm Bureau extension agent in Terre Haute, Indiana, and at Princeton Farms in Princeton, Indiana.

== Business career ==
The New York Times described Redenbacher: "But for all his bumpkin appearance, the man with the signature white wavy hair and oversized bow tie was a shrewd agricultural scientist who experimented with hybrids." He began his career selling fertilizer, but spent his spare time working with popcorn.

In 1951, Redenbacher and partner Charles F. Bowman bought the George F. Chester and Son seed corn plant in Boone Grove, Indiana. Naming the company "Chester Hybrids", they tried tens of thousands of hybrid strains of popcorn before settling on a hybrid they named "RedBow".

The following year in 1952, Redenbacher was elected president of the Indiana Corn Growers Association.

Over the next two decades, Chester became a worldwide supplier of popcorn seed while also selling its own varieties directly to consumers at its plant in Valparaiso, Indiana. In 1970, the company introduced a new gourmet hybrid popping corn developed by plant breeder Carl Hartman and began distributing it to retail outlets. On the advice of an advertising agency, the product was branded under Orville Redenbacher's name, and in February 1970 the company launched Orville Redenbacher's Gourmet Popping Corn in 30-ounce jars with the tagline "World's most expensive popping corn".

In 1976, Redenbacher sold the company to Hunt-Wesson Foods, a division of Norton Simon, Inc. In 1983, Esmark purchased Norton Simon, which in turn was acquired by Beatrice Foods in 1984. In 1985, Kohlberg Kravis Roberts acquired Beatrice with the goal of selling off businesses. In 1990, they sold the popcorn business and other old Hunt-Wesson businesses to agribusiness giant ConAgra.

=== Advertising ===
In 1973, Redenbacher appeared on TV's To Tell the Truth game show.

By the mid-1970s, Redenbacher and Bowman had captured a third of the unpopped-popcorn market. Redenbacher then moved to Coronado, California, where he lived for the remainder of his life.

He appeared as the company's official spokesperson, wearing a trademark outfit in public that included horn-rimmed glasses and a bow tie. Sometimes Redenbacher appeared in commercials with his grandson, Gary Redenbacher. Some customers wrote letters asking if Redenbacher was a real person, and not an actor. He responded to this by appearing on various talk shows, professing his identity. Redenbacher, in his book, states, "I want to make it clear that I am real."

== Personal life ==
Redenbacher was married to Corinne Rosemund Strate from 1928 until her death at 62 in 1971. Later that year, he married Nina Reder, and they remained married until her death at the age of 91 in May 1991. He had two daughters, 12 grandchildren and 10 great-grandchildren.

== Death and legacy ==
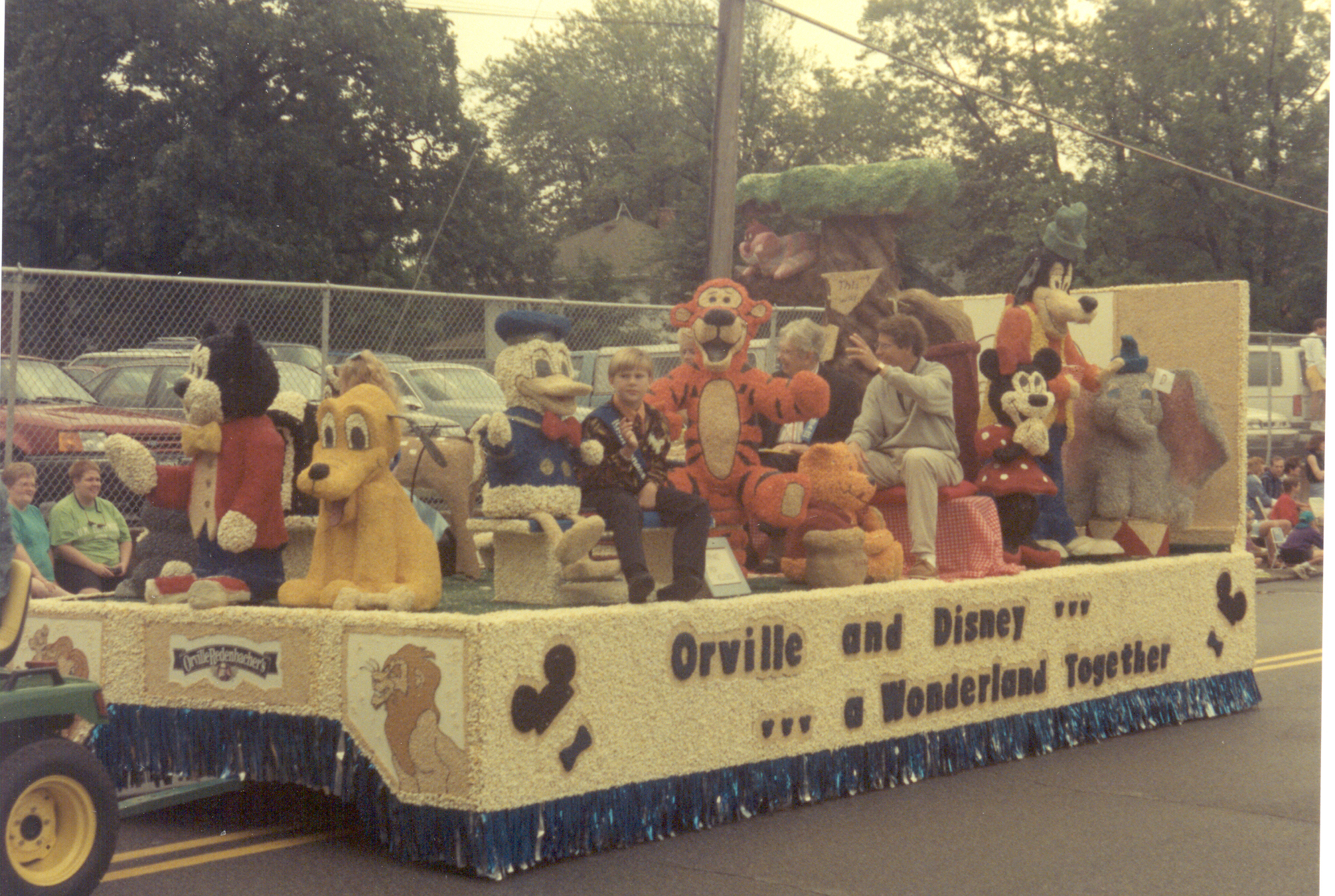
Redenbacher (center, behind Tigger) and grandson Gary (right) during the 1995 Valparaiso Popcorn Festival

On September 19, 1995, Redenbacher died in the hot tub of his condominium in Coronado, California. He suffered a heart attack and drowned. He was cremated and his ashes scattered at sea.

On the September 23, 1995, edition of Siskel & Ebert, Roger Ebert eulogized Redenbacher by calling him "a man who took popcorn seriously, as seriously as we take the movies." His co-host, Gene Siskel, added that "he actually was more than just a cute, cuddly advertising figure. He actually was a scientist who came up with a new strain of popcorn that really kept that whole industry alive [...] that's a real contribution."

In 1988, Purdue University awarded him an honorary doctorate.

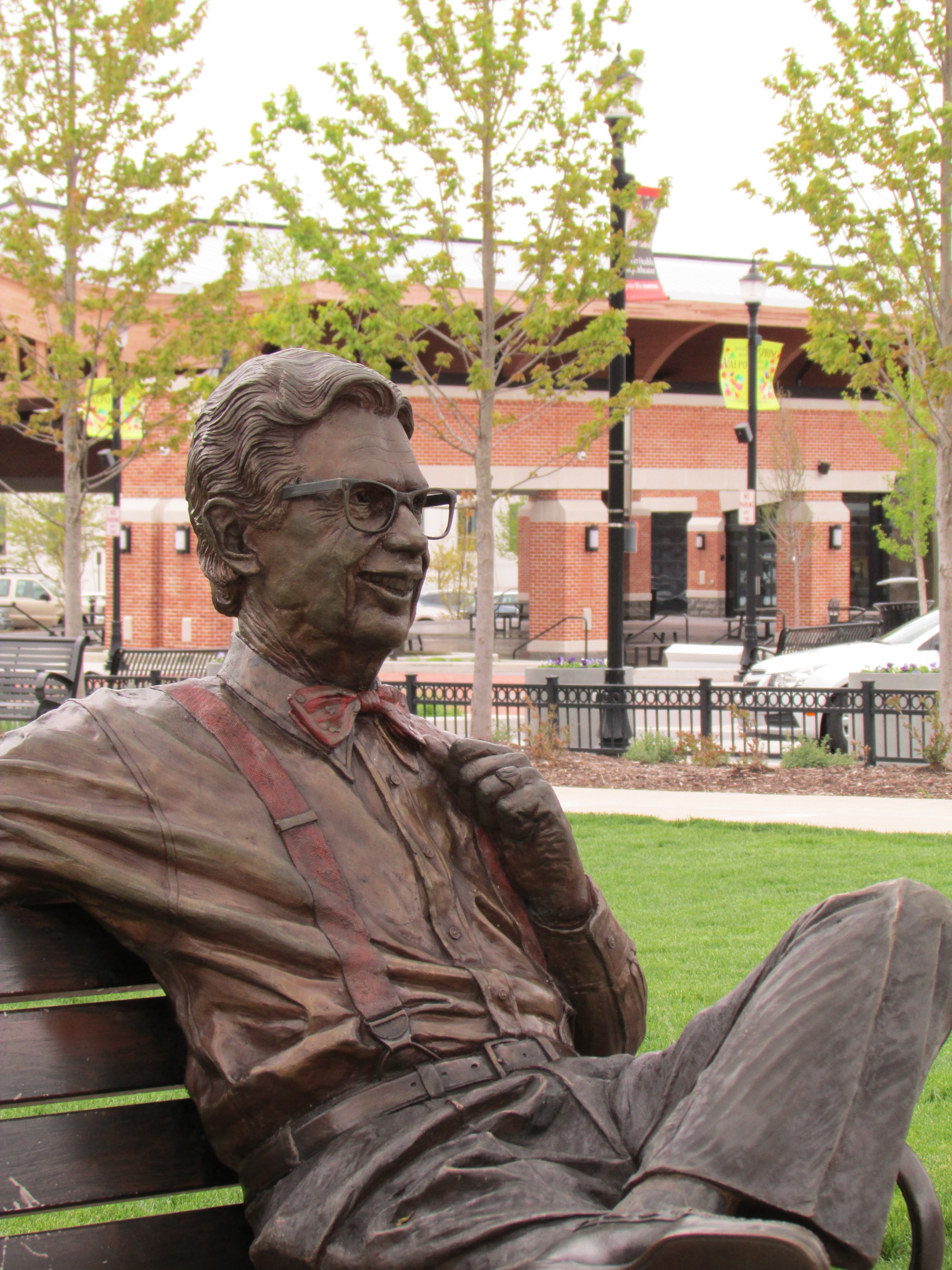
Orville Redenbacher 2012 statue, Valparaiso, Indiana

Aside from his contributions to the popcorn industry, he is noteworthy for his appearances on television, and in particular, his charismatic image in commercials.

Since 2006, several of Orville's commercials from the 1970s and 1980s have aired on many channels across the United States. The advertisements for the brand's "natural" popcorn snacks were introduced in 2008, 13 years after Redenbacher's death, and feature a clip of him at the end.

In January 2007, a television commercial featuring a digital recreation of Redenbacher appeared. Redenbacher's grandson, Gary Redenbacher, responded to questions about how he felt about the advertisement by saying: "Grandpa would go for it. He was a cutting-edge guy. This was a way to honor his legacy." Redenbacher's business partner, Charles F. Bowman, died in 2009.

On September 4, 2012, Valparaiso, Indiana, where Redenbacher resided for much of his life, unveiled a statue of him at the city's annual popcorn festival.

In 2022, Redenbacher was mentioned by American musical comedian Bo Burnham in the song "Microwave Popcorn" from the deluxe edition of his soundtrack album Inside (The Songs).

In 2025, Redenbacher's death was referenced by Roy Wood Jr. during the first episode of the second season of CNN's Have I Got News For You.
