= WGCS =

- Goshen, Indiana; United States
- Broadcast area: Elkhart, Indiana South Bend, Indiana
- Frequency: 91.1 MHz
- Branding: 91-1 The Globe

Programming
- Format: Adult album alternative
- Affiliations: PRX; Regional Radio Sports Network

Ownership
- Owner: Goshen College; (Goshen College Broadcasting Corporation)

History
- First air date: October 2, 1958
- Call sign meaning: "Goshen College Station"

Technical information
- Licensing authority: FCC
- Facility ID: 24663
- Class: A
- ERP: 6,000 watts
- HAAT: 89 meters (292 ft)
- Transmitter coordinates: 41°33′29.2″N 85°51′6″W

Links
- Public license information: Public file; LMS
- Webcast: Listen live
- Website: www.globeradio.org

WGCS is an adult album alternative-formatted broadcast radio station. The station is licensed to Goshen, Indiana, and serves Goshen, Elkhart, and South Bend in Indiana. WGCS is owned by Goshen College and operated under their Goshen College Broadcasting Corporation licensee.

== History ==
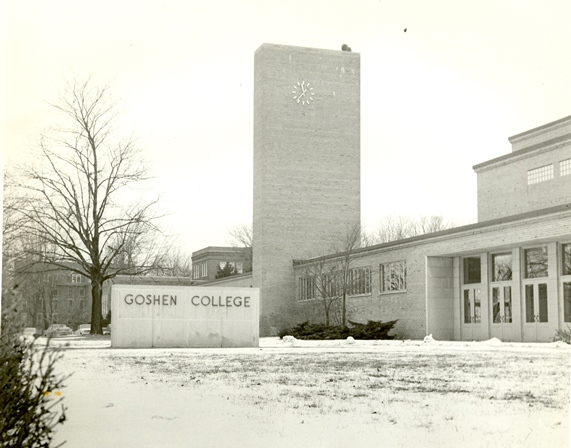
The Union Building at Goshen College housed WGCS at its launch

On January 28, 1957, Goshen College applied for a construction permit to build a new noncommercial radio station in Goshen after the class of 1956 made a gift of nearly $2,000 to establish one on the campus. Goshen College had previously operated a carrier current transmitter on the campus beginning in the 1940s; this ended in 1952 when the low-power broadcast was found to be operating with too much power after being heard as far away as Milford, Indiana. With a transmitter previously used at Western Michigan University, WGCS began broadcasting in 1958. In 1972, the station was transferred to the communications department, allowing Goshen College students to earn credit for working at WGCS. For much of its history, WGCS aired primarily classical music, along with educational and religious programs and specialty music shows.

In the late 1970s, WGCS was approved to increase effective radiated power from 390 watts to more than 7,000; stereo broadcasts also began, with both being made possible by more used equipment from another Michigan station, WAUS in Berrien Springs. As an educational tool, the station occasionally developed its own teaching materials; chief engineer Curt Holsopple wrote a textbook, Skills for Radio Broadcasting, for use in introductory broadcasting courses, in response to the need for a text that was more easily comprehended by Goshen College's international student body.

The longtime classical station made major changes in 2003 when Goshen alumnus Jason Samuel was hired as general manager, including a format change to a mix of Americana and adult album alternative and increased sports coverage. Since the format change, the station has been recognized nationally, being the first college station to repeat as winner of the "Best College Station in the Nation" award from the Intercollegiate Broadcasting System and also winning awards from the Indiana Association of School Broadcasters, and Broadcast Education Association. In 2017, WGCS won the Dr. Marjorie Yambor Signature Station Award from the Broadcast Education Association.
