= WEFM (FM) =

Radio station in Michigan City, Indiana

Coordinates: 41.7161°N 86.8631°W

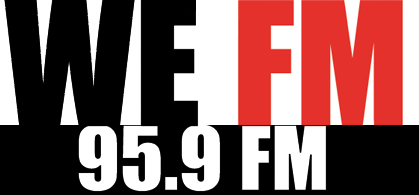
- Michigan City, Indiana; United States
- Broadcast area: Northwest Indiana
- Frequency: 95.9 MHz
- Branding: We FM

Programming
- Format: Full service AC/easy listening/news/talk
- Affiliations: Gary SouthShore RailCats; Indianapolis Colts; Regional Radio Sports Network; Westwood One Sports

Ownership
- Owner: Michigan City FM Broadcasters, Inc.

History
- First air date: September 1966 (as WMCB-FM)
- Former call signs: WMCB-FM (1966-1982)
- Call sign meaning: "We FM"

Technical information
- Licensing authority: FCC
- Facility ID: 41677
- Class: A
- ERP: 3,000 watts
- HAAT: 70 meters (230 ft)

Links
- Public license information: Public file; LMS

WEFM (95.9 MHz) is an FM radio station in Michigan City, Indiana, east of the Chicago metropolitan area. It is a member of the Indianapolis Colts affiliates radio network, the flagship station of the Gary SouthShore RailCats, and an affiliate of the Chicago White Sox.
