= Garry Puetz =

American football player (born 1952)

No. 78, 72, 64, 77, 71
- Position: Guard / Tackle

Personal information
- Born: March 14, 1952 (age 74); Elmhurst, Illinois, U.S.
- Listed height: 6 ft 3 in (1.91 m)
- Listed weight: 263 lb (119 kg)

Career information
- High school: Chicago (IL) Luther North
- College: Valparaiso
- NFL draft: 1973: 12th round, 300th overall pick

Career history
- New York Jets (1973–1978); Tampa Bay Buccaneers (1978); Philadelphia Eagles (1979); New England Patriots (1979–1981); Washington Redskins (1982)

Awards and highlights
- Super Bowl champion (XVII)
- Stats at Pro Football Reference

Garry Spencer Puetz (born March 14, 1952) is an American former professional football guard and tackle in the National Football League (NFL) for the New York Jets, Tampa Bay Buccaneers, Philadelphia Eagles, New England Patriots, and Washington Redskins. He played college football at Valparaiso University and was selected in the twelfth round of the 1973 NFL draft.

In 1971 and 1972, he was named to the Kodak College Division All-American Team. A three-time All-ICC offensive tackle (also kicker in 1972), he owns the distinction of earning a Super Bowl ring in 1982 with the Washington Redskins.

Puetz played baseball in college for two seasons, hitting .321 each year and leading the Crusaders in hitting in 1972.

Puetz is retired after spending 14 years as Director of Transportation for the Forsyth County (Ga.) School System and 23 years in the Pupil Transportation field.
