= Michael King (commentator) =

American commentator, columnist and television producer (born 1962)

- Born: Michael Howard King; December 18, 1962 (age 63); Gary, Indiana, U.S.
- Education: Theodore Roosevelt High School; Howard University; Purdue University
- Occupations: Commentator; columnist; television producer
- Awards: Edward R. Murrow Award (2016)

Michael Howard King (born December 18, 1962) is an American commentator, columnist and Murrow Award-winning and Emmy Award-winning television producer.

== Early life and education ==
Born and raised in Gary, Indiana, King graduated from Roosevelt High School in Gary in 1980. King attended Howard University and Purdue University and was a student journalist for the Purdue Exponent. His uncle Emery King was a reporter for NBC News.

== Career ==
While still a high school student, King began his first media job in August 1979 as a weekend DJ for Gary radio station WLTH. King worked at various other radio stations in Northern Indiana and the Washington metropolitan area in the 1980s.

King moved to the Atlanta metropolitan area in 1994, becoming station manager for WIGO (later WALR), a talk radio station targeting black Atlanta listeners. At WIGO, King launched new programming in January 1995 such as Georgia Live, a daily interview show distributed to seven other stations in Georgia and South Carolina. Beginning with the 1995 All-Star Game, WIGO began carrying NBA Radio Network game broadcasts in February 1995.

Joining black conservative organization Project 21 in 1996, King wrote commentaries for Project 21 from 1998 to 2005. In one 1999 commentary for Project 21, King opposed lowering academic standards for NCAA student-athletes on the grounds that "the primary purpose for college was to get an education, not to act as a farm system for the NBA."

Joining CNN Interactive in 1997, King was part of the web development team that launched CNNSI.com, the website for CNN Sports Illustrated, later that year.

At the end of the 1990s, King was a weekend morning news anchor for WGST.

In September 2005, King became a producer and reporter with WXIA-TV Atlanta.

In 2021, King moved from WXIA to Atlanta television station WUPA as a digital media strategist.

== Awards and recognition ==
At WXIA, King was part of WXIA's news production team that won the 2011 Southeast Emmy Award for News Programming Excellence (Category 1A) and the 11Alive.com website team that won a 2015 regional RTDNA Edward R. Murrow Award for Best Website.

In 2016, King won the Edward R. Murrow Award for Investigative Reporting among large market TV stations. This award was for an in-depth report on WXIA about the American Legislative Exchange Council, "Smart ALEC: The Backroom Where Laws Are Born".

== Personal life ==
King lives in Mableton, Georgia.
