= Valparaiso Popcorn Festival =

Annual food festival in Indiana, USA

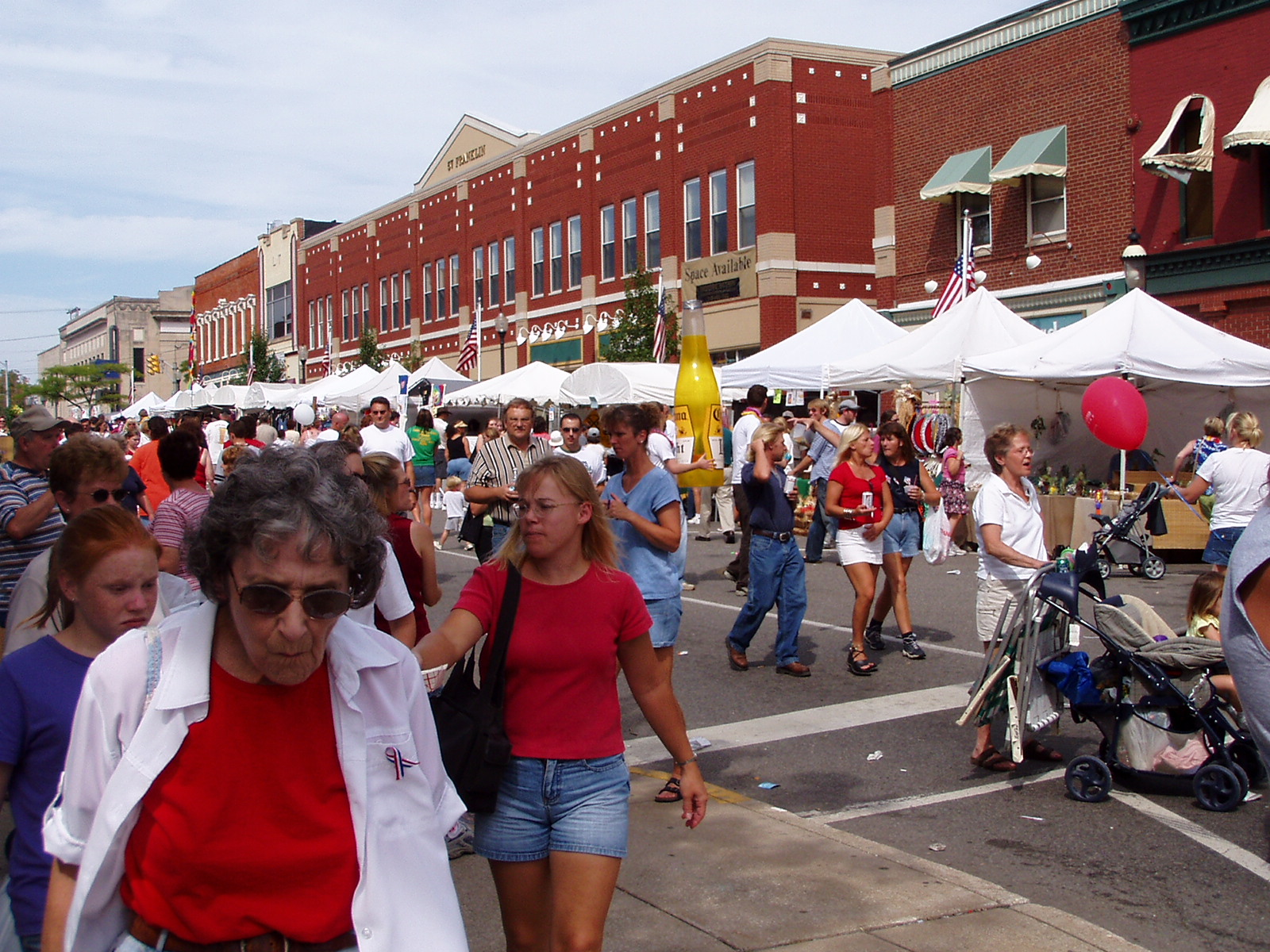
2004 Valparaiso Popcorn Festival

The Valparaiso Popcorn Festival is an annual one-day food festival held in September in Valparaiso, Indiana. The festival began in 1979 as a way to salute resident Orville Redenbacher, the food scientist and businessman associated with the brand of popcorn which bears his name.

Scheduled annually on the first Saturday after Labor Day, the Valparaiso Popcorn Festival is an all-day event held in the downtown area of Valparaiso.

Redenbacher lived in Valparaiso when he developed his gourmet popcorn hybrid, and introduced himself in his commercials as hailing from the city. The first festival was held on September 17, 1979, when the Chamber of Commerce declared "Orville Redenbacher Recognition Day." As many as 40,000 people attended the initial event, which included a parade, a hot-air balloon, and a "Popcorn Bowl" football game featuring Valparaiso University.

The festival has been held annually ever since, with the exception of 2020, when it was canceled due to the COVID-19 pandemic. Included in the festivities are a 5-mile/5-K run and walk dubbed the Popcorn Panic, a block-long kiddie run (the Lit'l Kernel Puff), live entertainment, hundreds of food and craft vendors, the crowning of the year's popcorn queen, and the nation's 2nd oldest Popcorn Parade. Parade designers are encouraged to use popcorn in their float designs.

A popcorn festival was held in Brazil, Indiana, which was the birthplace of Orville Redenbacher, for ten years. Popcorn festivals are also currently held annually in July in Corydon, Indiana, and in August in Van Buren, Indiana.
