= Factory Theater =

Chicago theatre company founded in 1992

The Factory Theater is a Chicago theatre company founded in 1992. Originally working out of a 50-seat storefront theater in the Rogers Park neighborhood in the northern part of Chicago, the company has produced over 100 shows during its existence (all original scripts written by ensemble members). The typical schedule during the first five seasons of the Factory Theater was a Thursday evening show, a Friday/Saturday mainstage show, and a Friday/Saturday late-night show. In 1997, after years of ongoing improvements and renovations to the theater in an unsuccessful attempt to satisfy building-code requirements, the company moved out of its Rogers Park storefront and into the Footsteps Theater's space on Clark Street in the Andersonville neighborhood. They were itinerant from 2000-2003 then took residence at the Prop Thtr in Chicago. As of 2015, they have moved into their new 70-seat space right back in Rogers Park on Howard Street right by the CTA Red Line.

== Artistic leadership ==
The original Co-Artistic Directors were Sean Abley and Amy Seeley (1992-97), with Michael Beyer as Board President. Abley departed for Los Angeles in 1997 (the day after Battleaxe Betty opening night). Nick Digilio took over as Artistic Director from 1998-2007, with Molly Brennan as Board President / Managing Director beginning in 1998. Scott OKen would replace Digilio as Artistic Director in 2007, a position he'd hold until 2017. In 2017, the Factory announced the election of their new artistic leadership team, Co-Artistic Directors Stacie Barra and Manny Tamayo, replacing OKen. In the resurgence of live theater at the tail end of the pandemic, the Factory announced new Co-Artistic Directors--long-time ensemble members Timothy C Amos and Shannon O'Neill.

== The Factory Theater West ==
The Factory Theater West, composed of Factory Theater ensemble members who had relocated to Los Angeles, produced five productions from 1999-2001. All productions were either remounts of past Factory Theater shows or original works.

== Members ==
=== Founding ===
- Sean Abley
- Bo Blackburn
- Michael Meredith
- Tom Purcell
- Jeff Rogers
- Amy Seeley

=== Current ensemble ===
- Timothy C. Amos
- Jennifer Betancourt
- Kim Boler
- Brittney Brown
- Jose M. Cervantes
- Phil Claudnic
- Spenser Davis
- Matt Engle
- Linsey Falls
- Christine Jennings
- Michael Jones
- Shannon O'Neill
- C.W. van Baale
- Chas Vrba
- Ashley Yates

=== Past and emeritus ensemble ===
- Kevin Alves
- Carl Andress (aka Andruskevich)
- Wendy Avon
- David Babbitt
- Stacie Barra
- Mike Beyer
- Stephanie Boles
- Nick Booth
- George Brant
- Ray Brazaski
- Molly Brennan
- David Bryson
- Wm. Bullion
- Allison Cain
- Greg Caldwell
- Cynthia Cervini
- Robyn Coffin
- Esteban Andres Cruz
- Tucker Curtis
- Blake Dalzin
- Elise Marie Davis
- Ernie Deak
- Jesse Dienstag
- Nick Digilio
- Brooke Dillman
- Catherine Dughi
- Keith Ellis
- Jennifer Gehr
- Joe Gehr
- Sarah Rose Graber
- Josh Graves
- Jerry Hlava
- Patrick Holland
- Joie Jackson-Graves
- Jenny Laffey (née Kirkland)
- Jason Lubow
- Peter Marcy
- Angelina Martinez
- Michael Mazzara
- Laura McKenzie
- Paul Metreyeon
- Joey Meyer
- Darryl Miller
- Colin Milroy
- Jason Moody
- Heather Moran
- Johnny Moran
- Christian Murphy
- Scott OKen
- Todd Oldham
- Jill Oliver
- Ryan Oliver
- Matthew O'Neill
- Mike Ooi
- Corrbette Pasko
- Scott Pasko
- Jennifer Pompa
- Kirk Pynchon
- Kevin Rich
- Dale Rivera
- Eric Roach
- Jill Rothamer
- Sara Sevigny
- Noah Simon
- Carrie J. Sullivan
- Michelle Suffredin
- Patricia Sutherland
- Rachel Sypniewski
- Dan Tamarkin
- Manny Tamayo
- Jermaine Edward Thomas
- Anthony Tournis
- Wendy Tregay
- Heather Tyler
- Steve Walker
- Mandy Walsh
- Steve Wilson

== Production history ==
=== 1992 ===
- Snafu: sketch comedy
- Reefer Madness by Sean Abley
- Spin Doctors by Jeff Rogers

=== 1993 ===
- Attack of the Killer B's by Sean Abley
- Tribe: improv with Bo Blackburn, Joe Dempsey, Marssie Mencotti and Kent Sterling
- The Angry Show by Nick Digilio and Mike Meredith
- Lovely Letters by George Brant
- Bucket of Blood by Marssie Mencotti and Dave Springer (based on the film)
- Bitches by Sean Abley
- Santa Claus Conquers the Martians by Sean Abley

=== 1994 ===
- Hooray! conceived by Amy Seeley, written by Sean Abley, Mike Beyer, Bo Blackburn, Heather Delker, Jenny Kirkland-Laffey, Joey Meyer, Mike Meredith, Amy Seeley and Wendy Tregay
- Alive by Nick Digilio and Mike Meredith
- Kong! by George Brant
- Free Pizza: by Mike Beyer
- Man Card by Kirk Pynchon and Jesse Dienstag
- Disco Bob: improv with Sean Abley, Bo Blackburn, Mike Meredith, Amy Seeley and Eric Frankie
- Beaverhunt by Amy Seeley and Jenny Kirkland-Laffey

=== 1995 ===
- Sabotage by Nick Digilio and Mike Beyer
- Jailbait by Amy Seeley
- P by Sean Abley, Bo Blackburn, Heather Delker, Jenny Kirkland-Laffey, Amy Seeley
- Pet-Scare Theater by Jill Rothamer
- Sit' Com by George Brant
- White Trash Wedding and a Funeral by Mike Beyer and Bill Havle
- The Christmas Show by Joey Meyer

=== 1996 ===
- Preying Manthis by Wendy Tregay
- ABBArama by Amy Seeley
- My Period by Jenny Kirkland-Laffey
- Urban Legends by Bo Blackburn
- Being at Choice: by Mike Meredith
- Win, Place or Show by Nick Digilio and Ernie Deak
- 529 S. Something by Molly Brennan
- Rapid Fire by Molly Brennan
- Utterly, Completely Bored Out of My Friggin' Mind by Jill Rothamer
- Escape from The North Pole by Nick Digilio and Mike Meredith
- Second City Didn't Want Us, or, Is There a Spot in the Touring Company for My Girlfriend? sketch comedy conceived by Sean Abley and written by Sean Abley, Bo Blackburn, Brooke Dillman, Eric Frankie, Jenny Kirkland-Laffey, Mike Meredith and Amy Seeley

=== 1997 ===
- Nuclear Family by Sean Abley
- Battleaxe Betty by Molly Brennan
- The Surreal World by Jill Rothamer
- Clean by Michael Meredith
- Fat! by Michelle Suffredin
- The Repair Guys by Scott OKen
- The Factory Theater's Shut Up and Laugh Comedy Festival

=== 1998 ===
- The Barbara Walters Interviews by Jenny Kirkland-Laffey
- The Factory All-Star Late Night Fiasco
- Vinyl Shop by Nick Digilio and Mike Vieau
- Amy Seeley and the Moline Madman by Amy Seeley
- The Factory Theater's Shut Up and Laugh Comedy Festival II

=== 1999 ===
- Herb Stabler, Wandering Spirit by Mike Beyer
- Surface Dwellers by Scott OKen and Ernest Deak
- Dancing With the Past by Patricia Sutherland
- Factory Match Game '99
- Dragontales by Molly Brennan
- Endzone by Michael Mazzara
- The Factory Theater's Shut Up and Laugh Comedy Festival III

=== 2000 ===
- Gooooooo Speech Team! by Jenny Kirkland-Laffey

=== 2001 ===
- Variations on Death by Kevin Rich
- Captain Raspberry by Matthew O'Neill
- The Death and Life of Barb Budonovich by Kevin Rich

=== 2002 ===
- Poppin and Lockdown by Kirk Pynchon and Michael Meredith
- Lab Rats by Various Artists (incl. Brett Neveu, Ryan Oliver, Jennifer Pompa)
- Eagle Hills, Eagle Ridge, Eagle Landing by Brett Neveu
- Among the Dead by Ryan Oliver

=== 2003 ===
- Dick Danger: DJ Crime Solver by George Brant
- Factory Theater Presents.....CHICAGOSTYLE by Various Artists
- Here Comes a Regular by Nick Digilio and Mike Vieau

=== 2004 ===
- Being at Choice (remount) by Mike Meredith
- Poppin and Lockdown 2: Dance the Right Thing by Kirk Pynchon and Mike Meredith
- Ménage À Trailer by Laura McKenzie and Mark Sam Rosenthal

=== 2005 ===
- Toast of the Town by Scott OKen and Ernie Deak
- Lonesome Hoboes by George Brant
- Top Shelf... by Scott OKen

=== 2006 ===
- The Willing Participant by Matthew O'Neill
- GIs in Europe by Scott OKen and Ernie Deak
- Operation Infiltration: An Experiment in Terror by Manny Tamayo

=== 2007 ===
- Janice Dutts Goes to Life Camp by Laura McKenzie
- Siskel & Ebert Save Chicago by Eric Roach
- Dirty Diamonds by Mike Beyer

=== 2008 ===
- Ceres by Heather Tyler
- Ren Faire! A Fistfull of Ducats by Matt Engle
- Shameless Shamuses by Ernie Deak
- Bustin' Out of the Hell by Scott OKen

=== 2009 ===
- Mop Top Festival by Scott OKen
- Dead Wrong by Manny Tamayo
- 1985 by Chas Vrba
- Hunky Dory by Joe Gehr

=== 2010 ===
- Hey! Dancin! by Kirk Pynchon and Mike Beyer
- The League of Awesome by Corrbette Pasko and Sara Sevigny
- Jenny and Jenni by Shannon O'Neill
- 1985 (remount at the DCA Storefront Theatre) by Chas Vrba
- The New Adventures of Popeye by Sarah Rose Graber

=== 2011 ===
- Easy Six by Scott OKen and Ernie Deak
- Black and Blue by Anthony Tournis and Nick Digilio
- The Gray Girl by Colin Milroy

=== 2012 ===
- White Trash Wedding and a Funeral (20th Season Remount) by Mike Beyer and Bill Halve
- Renfaire! A Fistful of Ducats! (20th Season Remount) by Matt Engle
- Toast of the Town (20th Season Remount) by Scott OKen and Ernie Deak

=== 2013 ===
- Incident on Run 1217 by Manny Tamayo: Winner, Joseph Jefferson Award, Best New Play (Non-Equity Wing)
- Namosaur! by Scott OKen
- Street Justice: Condition Red by Anthony Tournis and Colin Milroy

=== 2014 ===
- Hey! Dancin'! Hey! Musical! by Kirk Pynchon and Mike Beyer, music & lyrics by Laura McKenzie
- Take the Cake by Stacie Barra
- Hotel Aphrodite by Angelina Martinez, story by Allison Cain

=== 2016 ===
- The Last Big Mistake by Ernie Deak
- Dating and Dragons by Mike Ooi

=== 2016–17 ===
- Zombie Broads by Corrbette Pasko and Sara Sevigny
- Born Ready by Stacie Barra
- Fight City by Scott OKen

=== 2017–18 ===
- Captain Steve's Caring Kingdom by Mike Ooi
- The Next Big Thing by Carrie Sullivan
- The Adventures of Spirit Force Five by Jill Oliver
- The Xmas War by Scott OKen

=== 2018–19 ===
- The Darkness After Dawn by Manny Tamayo
- May the Road Rise Up by Shannon O'Neill
- Prophet$ by Anthony Tournis
- The Xmas Endgame by Scott OKen

=== 2019 through 2022 (pandemic) ===
- Oh Sh#t! It's Haunted! by Scott OKen
- Last Night in Karaoke Town by Mike Beyer and Kirk Pynchon

=== 2022-2023 ===
- The HOA by Angelina Martinez
- The Kelly Girls by Shannon O’Neill
- Lane Call A Night of Closing by Len Foote and Scott OKen

=== 2023-2024 ===
- Wise Guys: The First Christmas Story by Chase Wheaton-Werle
- Party At The Pantheon: A Modern Greek Stoner Comedy by Michael Jones
- Die Hard 4 Your Luv by Kirk Pynchon & Mike Beyer

=== 2024-2025 ===
- Stabbed in the Heart by Nate Hall and Cody Lindley
- Inheritance or Brothers from the Deep by Michael Jones
- Kitty James and Destiny’s Trail to Oregon by Phil Claudnic
- The Curious Circumstances of Louis Le Prince by Chase Wheaton-Werle

== Production history at Factory Theater West ==
=== 1999 ===
- White Trash Wedding and a Funeral by Mike Beyer and Bill Havle
- Attack of the Killer B's by Sean Abley: Winner, Backstage West Garland Award for Best Adaptation

=== 2000 ===
- Being at Choice by Michael Meredith
- Kirk du Soleil by Kirk Pynchon

=== 2001 ===
- Poppin' and Lockdown by Kirk Pynchon and Mike Meredith
