= WRDI =

Coordinates: 41.449°N 86.075°W

- Nappanee, Indiana; United States
- Broadcast area: South Bend, Indiana
- Frequency: 95.7 MHz
- Branding: Relevant Radio

Programming
- Format: Catholic radio
- Network: Relevant Radio

Ownership
- Owner: Relevant Radio, Inc.

History
- First air date: December 16, 1991
- Former call signs: WXJG (1990–1991); WLRX (1991–2005); WYPW (2005–2010); WAOR (2010–2014)
- Call sign meaning: Redeemer Radio (previous branding)

Technical information
- Licensing authority: FCC
- Facility ID: 49174
- Class: A
- ERP: 2,500 watts
- HAAT: 155 meters (509 ft)

Links
- Public license information: Public file; LMS
- Webcast: Listen live
- Website: relevantradio.com

WRDI (95.7 FM) is a radio station broadcasting a Catholic radio format. Licensed to Nappanee, Indiana, WRDI serves the South Bend market. The station is owned by the Relevant Radio network.

== History ==
The station signed on as WLRX on December 16, 1991 (the calls for the construction permit granted in 1990 had been WXJG, but the station was never on the air with those calls). WLRX broadcast ABC Radio/SMN's StarStation adult contemporary format serving the Nappanee area under the name "Star 96", then segued to a hot adult contemporary direction with local DJs as "Magic 95.7" and broadened its focus to include South Bend and Elkhart. It was during this time the station also changed hands from Indiana Star Broadcasting to Service Communications of South Bend. Service was purchased by Talking Stick Communications which is now a part of Federated Media.

At midnight on February 4, 2005, the station adopted an urban contemporary format as "Power 95.7" and took the call letters WYPW, which it held until May 10, 2010, when it took the WAOR call sign and classic rock format previously heard on 95.3 FM. At that time, 95.3 was relaunched as WTRC-FM "Michiana's News Channel", a news/talk station that took The Rush Limbaugh Show, The Glenn Beck Program, and Fox News Radio from rival WSBT.

On May 25, 2012, it was announced that Federated Media would change WAOR from a classic rock format to an all-sports format. The change was effective June 4, 2012. Local sports coverage, including high school football and basketball and weekly talk show "The Coaches Box", aired through affiliation with the Regional Radio Sports Network.

On April 1, 2014, WAOR became an ESPN Radio affiliate. A month later, Federated Media announced that WAOR would be sold to St. Joseph Catholic Radio Group. On August 14, 2014, WAOR changed its call letters to WRDI. On September 1, 2014, WRDI changed its format to Catholic talk, branded as "Redeemer Radio". The sale to St. Joseph, at a price of $925,000, was consummated on September 12, 2014.
