= Luther High School North =

Location
- 5700 W. Berteau Ave. Chicago, Illinois; United States
- 41°57′27″N 87°46′14″W

Information
- Other name: Luther North College Prep
- Type: Private secondary, Coeducational
- Established: 1909
- Status: Closed
- Closed: 2017
- Last principal: Wayne Wenzel Jr.
- Grades: 9–12
- Enrollment: 170
- Colors: Blue and gold
- Mascot: Wildcats
- Affiliation: Lutheran Church–Missouri Synod
- Website: www.luthernorthcollegeprep.org

Luther High School North, formerly known as Luther North College Prep, was a private high school located in the Portage Park neighborhood of Chicago, Illinois. It was affiliated with the Lutheran Church–Missouri Synod.

Its predecessor was Luther Institute, founded in 1909 as a Lutheran High School and located in the Near West Side neighborhood of Chicago. In 1953 the school moved to a campus in Portage Park, Chicago. Enrollment peaked at about 1,400 in the 1960s and 1970s, but declined thereafter. Due to financial difficulties, the Portage Park campus was sold to New Life Community Church in 2010, with the school sharing occupancy. In February 2017, with an enrollment of only 170 students despite recruiting efforts, the school announced that it would cease operations after the 2016–2017 school year.

== Notable alumni ==
- David W. Anderson, "Famous Dave's" restaurateur
- Dale Carlson, former head coach of the Valparaiso Crusaders football team
- Nick Digilio, movie critic, podcaster and former WGN radio personality
- Ken Grundt, former MLB player (Boston Red Sox)
- C. R. Hagen, noted particle physicist
- Garry Puetz, former NFL player and Super Bowl XVII champion
