= Purdue Exponent =

Independent student newspaper at Purdue University

The Exponent

- The January 20, 2006 front page of The Exponent
- Type: Student newspaper
- Format: Broadsheet
- School: Purdue University
- Owner: Purdue Student Publishing Foundation
- Publisher: Kyle Charters
- Editor: Avery Goldthorpe
- Founded: 1889; 137 years ago
- Headquarters: 460 Northwestern Avenue; West Lafayette, IN 47906; United States
- City: West Lafayette
- Website: purdueexponent.org

The Purdue Exponent is an independent student newspaper that serves Purdue University in West Lafayette, Indiana. It is published on Mondays and Thursdays during university semesters by the Purdue Student Publishing Foundation, and is Indiana's largest collegiate newspaper.

The Exponent employs four full-time professionals, relying for most operations on a staff of approximately 100 students, though the university has no journalism school.

Exponent alumni have won six Pulitzers, six Emmys, two Peabodys, and two John Chancellors.

== History ==
The Exponent's first edition was published on December 15, 1889. It was a daily paper from 1906 to 2016. In 2017, it switched to a twice-weekly printing schedule. The Web edition (www.purdueexponent.org) was started in 1996. It was the first college newspaper in the country to build its own building (built in 1989 and sold in 2017, but the organization still resides there) and one of two college newspapers that continues to own its own press.

The path to becoming an independent entity began in 1968, when the university removed William R. Smoot II as editor-in-chief. The move followed critical and controversial columns in the newspaper, particularly one on October 23, 1968, that castigated university president Frederick L. Hovde.

The university informed Smoot on Friday, November 8, 1968, that he was being removed, but the sixteen editors on the staff refused to accept the dictum. On Saturday, it put out a special edition with a headline, "We Will Still Publish". By Monday, the headline was more defiant: "Smoot Will Continue: Staff".

University officials claimed that alumni and political pressure had nothing to do with the move to remove Smoot, but Thomas Graham, a Purdue trustee later said, "Not only did I get a whole bunch of letters, I'd go down to cash a check at the bank and an old friend would grab (me) by the front of the shirt and tell (me), 'Now dammit, you know right from wrong. Now go up there and get those liberals out of that university.' ... That's how it's done here in southern Indiana."

The firing of the editor pushed to the fore the issue of who owned and who was responsible for oversight of the student newspaper. The issue was given to a faculty-student-administrator committee called the Exponent Review Board, but known as the Osmun Commission for its chairman, the Dr. John Osmun. Ultimately the Osmun Commission decided over the opposition of administration members that while Hovde had the authority to fire Smoot, the university did not follow due process. Smoot was allowed to remain as editor-in-chief.

More important in the long term, the commission recommended that the Exponent become a not-for-profit corporation headed by a publishing board, the Purdue Student Publishing Foundation. Its rent-free use that had been in place since 1933 of windowless offices in the basement (Room B-50) of the Purdue Memorial Union would end in 1969 and the organization paid rent to the university until moving out in May 1989.

In 1975, at the urging of then Purdue President Arthur Hansen, the Exponent became free distribution with 10,000 copies distributed on campus.

== Recent operations ==
The newspaper struggled through the first several years of organization, partly because it was capitalized only by operating revenues and partly because it was being forced to rent space from the university and to purchase printing equipment that had already been paid for. It went through a period of alternately making and losing money, though student staff members were all volunteers at that time.

A critical point came in 1975 when the newspaper went to free campus-wide circulation, expanding market coverage and gaining significant advertising income.

By 1988, revenues had grown substantially and the newspaper began construction on the 22,500-square-foot (2,090 m^{2}) facility that it now occupies, but no longer owns, at 460 Northwestern Avenue in West Lafayette.

The newspaper today distributes 9,000 copies twice-weekly during the school year and 5,000 during the summer. Revenues are nearly $1 million per year. The Exponent is only one of two college newspapers that own and operate their own printing press.

During the 2021–2022 academic year, the Exponent was ranked in ninth place for U.S. college newspapers for the most organic traffic, with 86,465 website visits. It also ranked fourth for most social engagement, with 377,220 total shares in the same year, and fourth in average number of shares per article, with 204 shares.

== Notable alumni ==
- Ken Armstrong, investigative reporter, book author, reporter, ProPublica
- Earl Butz, former U.S. Secretary of Agriculture.
- Brandt Hershman, attorney, former Majority Floor Leader, Indiana State Senate (retiring in 2018); former writer for President George H. W. Bush.
- Rick Karr, journalist and educator who reports primarily on media and technology's impact on culture.
- Michael King, digital executive producer and Internet reporter, WXIA-TV, Atlanta
- Mark O'Hare, cartoonist
- Larry Persily, editorial page editor for the Anchorage Daily News; former publisher of The Wrangell Sentinel; nature gas pipeline coordinator for Alaska for the Obama administration
- Bob Peterson, cartoonist at the Exponent 1985–1987; animator, screenwriter, director, voice actor, Pixar
- Orville Redenbacher, food scientist
- Ginger Thompson, senior reporter, ProPublica; former bureau chief, The New York Times, 2001 Pulitzer Prize winner,
