= Felicia Middlebrooks =

American radio news broadcaster (born 1957)

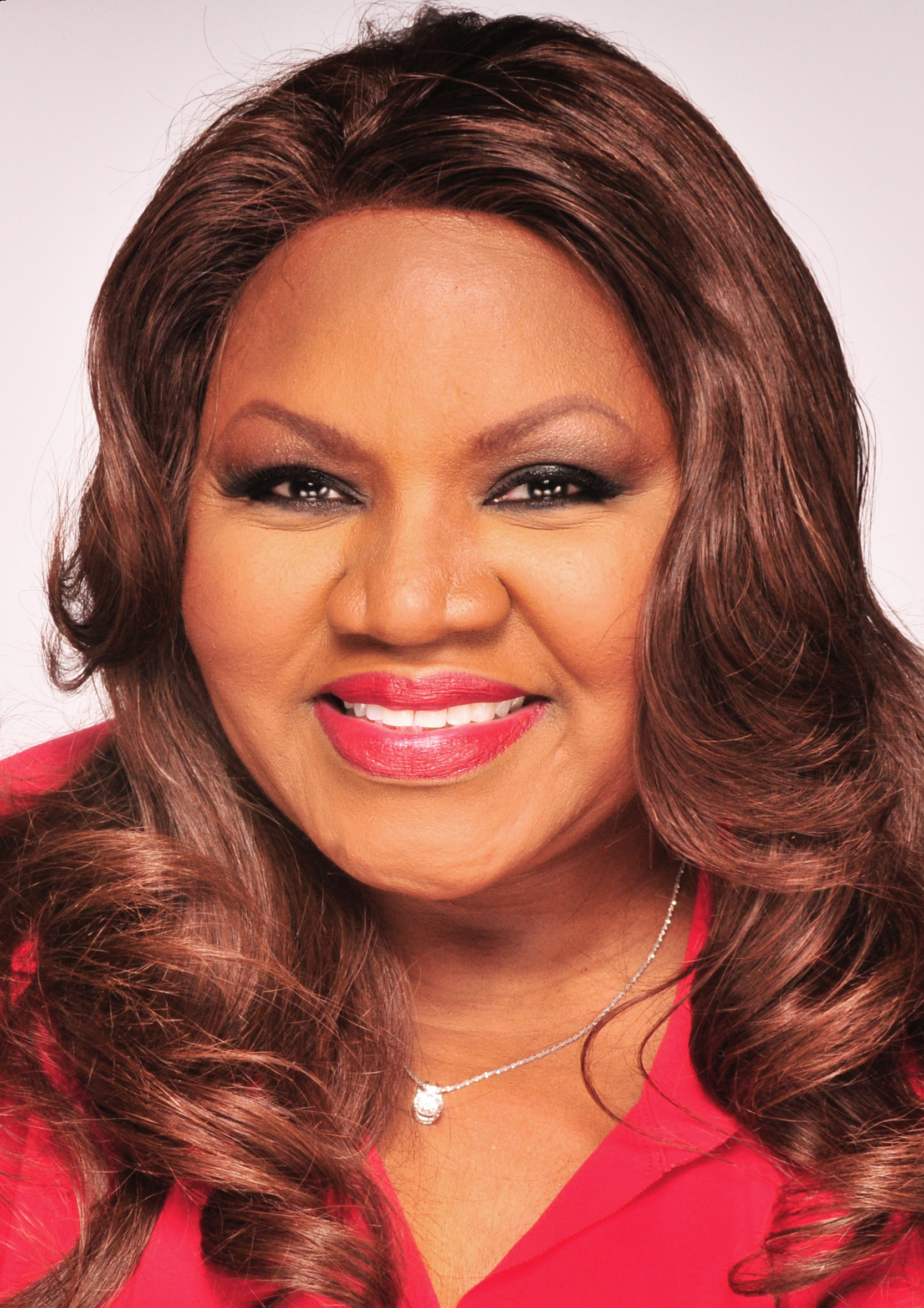
Felicia Middlebrooks, in 2016.

Felicia Middlebrooks (born May 29, 1957) is an American radio news broadcaster. She was the morning-drive news anchor of WBBM Newsradio in Chicago, Illinois, along with Pat Cassidy. Their morning show was rated No. 1 in the morning daypart in Chicago. Middlebrooks has announced she is leaving WBBM effective May 29, 2020 to work at her own company, Saltshaker Productions.

== Biography ==
Felicia Middlebrooks was born in Gary, Indiana. She graduated from West Side High School and Purdue University Calumet earning a bachelor's degree in Mass Communications in 1982 and an MBA in 2014, where she also takes on the role as a professor for broadcast news. She worked as a steelworker in northwest Indiana to finance her undergrad education. Her previous radio stations were WBAA, WJOB, WGVE, and WLTH before coming to Chicago. Felicia broke barriers in 1984 when she became the first woman and first African American in the nation to co-anchor mornings for CBS Radio. She has won numerous awards for leadership and reporting (domestic and global) including the Edward R. Murrow Award for Excellence in News, the Associated Press "Best Reporter Award" and the Lifetime Achievement Award from Sigma Delta Chi Society of Professional Journalists/Chicago Headline Club. Middlebrooks is Principal of Saltshaker Productions LLC, with offices in Chicago and Los Angeles. Her first documentary film, Somebody's Child: The Redemption of Rwanda won first place for "Best Documentary Short" in the 2005 New York International Film & Video Festival. Felicia is also a published author. She founded the non-profit Hollywood Comes to Chicago to help aspiring young screenwriters in the Midwest. She serves on the Board of Directors for three non-profit organizations: Hands of Hope, WINGS: Women in Need Growing Stronger, and Children's Home and Aid Society (CHASI).

== Other morning co-anchors ==
Here is a list of the news co-anchors who have worked with Felicia Middlebrooks since she started in 1984:

- 1984-1998 & 2008-2010: John Hultman
- 1998-2000: Ken Herrera
- 2000-2008 & 2010-2020: Pat Cassidy

== Selected publications ==
A partial list of books of which Middlebrooks was an author:

- Called (co-authored by Lisa D. Jefferson, Moody Publishing)
- Souls of My Sisters (Kensington Publishing)
