= WJOB (AM) =

- Hammond, Indiana; United States
- Broadcast area: Chicago metropolitan area
- Frequency: 1230 kHz
- Branding: AM-1230 WJOB

Programming
- Format: Talk; brokered programming
- Affiliations: Premiere Networks; Regional Radio Sports Network

Ownership
- Owner: Vazquez Development, LLC

History
- First air date: 1923; 103 years ago
- Former call signs: WWAE (1923–1940)

Technical information
- Licensing authority: FCC
- Facility ID: 12219
- Class: C
- Power: 1,000 watts
- Transmitter coordinates: 41°35′49.13″N 87°28′45.15″W
- Translator: 104.7 W284CY (Hammond)

Links
- Public license information: Public file; LMS
- Webcast: Listen live
- Website: www.wjob1230.com

WJOB (1230 kHz) is a commercial AM radio station in Hammond, Indiana. It features a mix of talk and brokered programming with news and high school sports. Some hours are sold to hosts who may advertise their goods and services or seek donations. The studio is located in the Purdue Commercialization & Excellence Center, less than a mile (1.6 km) south of the transmitter tower and broadcast facility.

WJOB is a Class C station with a power of 1,000 watts using a non-directional antenna. Programming is also heard via 250-watt FM translator, W284CY on 104.7 MHz in Hammond.

== History ==
=== Early years ===
The station was first authorized, as WWAE, by a telegram sent to the Alamo Dance Hall (L. J. Crowley) on November 10, 1923, and operated by Dr. George F. Courier and Lawrence J. "Butch" Crowley (a reputed mobster) in Joliet, Illinois. It was among the earliest stations on the air in the Chicago area. The call sign was randomly assigned from a sequential roster of available call letters. A transmitter was built at the Alamo Dance Hall in Joliet.

The station was deleted on August 9, 1924, then reauthorized the following October 3. On May 27, 1925, ownership was changed to the Electric Park Company (L. J. Crowley) of Plainfield, Illinois, and the transmitter moved to 915 North Raynor Boulevard. Broadcasting facilities, located at 321 Clinton Street, Joliet, were later moved to the Hammond Douglas Park Area, now known as Pulaski Park, and a small studio was built on the northwest side of the park. The broadcasting facilities were later moved to a main studio at 402 Fayette Street, Fayette and Hohman Avenue, which today sits the former home of Bank Calumet (Calumet National Bank Building).

Following the establishment of the Federal Radio Commission (FRC), stations were initially issued a series of temporary authorizations starting on May 3, 1927. In addition, stations were informed that if they wanted to continue operating, they needed to file a formal license application by January 15, 1928, as the first step in determining whether they met the new "public interest, convenience, or necessity" standard. On May 25, 1928, the FRC issued General Order 32, which notified 164 stations, including WWAE, that "From an examination of your application for future license it does not find that public interest, convenience, or necessity would be served by granting it." However, the station successfully convinced the commission that it should remain licensed.

On November 11, 1928, the FRC implemented a major reallocation of station transmitting frequencies, as part of a reorganization resulting from its implementation of General Order 40. WWAE was assigned to 1200 kHz, sharing time with WRAF in La Porte, Indiana. On March 29, 1941, WWAE, along with most of the stations on 1200 kHz, moved to 1230 kHz, its location ever since, as part of the implementation of the North American Regional Broadcasting Agreement.

=== WJOB ===
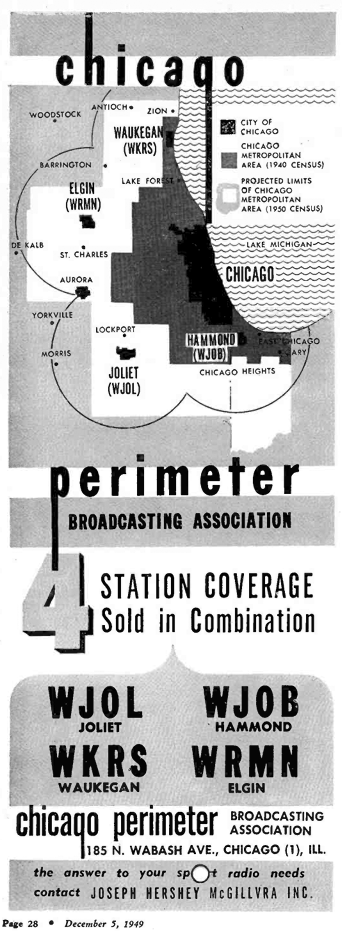
1949 advertisement included WJOB as one of a group of stations providing radio coverage for Chicago.

The station was sold to O.E. Richardson, Fred L. Adair, and Robert C. Adair, and the call sign was changed to WJOB on October 7, 1940. The new owners moved the main studios to 449 State Street, above the Millikan Building, across from the Edward C. Minas Department Store, and the name of the corporation was changed to The South Shore Broadcasting Corporation.

The station grew in popularity offering a variety of programming under the leadership of Sam Weller as the Programming Director. Some of the programs offered were the Happy Hour, which had a membership of 1,200 young members and was broadcast every Saturday morning from 10:30 to 11:30 under the direction of Mrs. O.E. Richardson, the wife of one of the owners. The new programming schedule was also included programs in five foreign languages, including Eddie Oskierko of the Polish Musical Varieties Program, Cornelius Szakatis, of the Hungarian Hour, John Babinec of the Slovac Hour, Stella Lutefisk directing the Greek Hour, and Gilbert Vasquez as the director of the Spanish Program.

Included in this schedule of programming were Eddie Honesty of the "Rockin-In-Rhythm" program, the first black program on WJOB heard every Wednesday from 3:15 to 4 o'clock and also Saturday afternoons from 2 to 3 o'clock. Paul E. X. Brown, the only black newscaster in the country, was heard every Sunday at 10 a.m. Included in the programming were the Rev. Odell Reed, who conducted his services from 4635 State Street in Chicago, the first remote broadcast of radio station WJOB. Also included were Rev. William Carr and Clarence Parsons, with the Royal Quartet singing the well loved Negro spirituals.

One of the most popular shows of that era was the Sun-Dodgers show which featured daily from midnight until 4 a.m. with Wayne Osborne as the announcer and Dave Erickson as its director. Women's programming was conducted by Miss Kitty Blake, who produced the “It Happened in Hammond” program daily at 11:15 a.m., and Frances Benson, who read stories for children each Friday at 1:15 p.m. Also featured were all Lake County High Schools who took part in the “High Schools On Parade Program”, heard every Thursday.

The station remained at 449 State Street in downtown Hammond until May 5, 1956, when it erected a new transmitter tower and broadcasting facility at 6405 Olcott Avenue in the Woodmar section of Hammond, where it remains today. A YouTube video features a 1959 broadcast of polka legend Li'l Wally Walter Jagiello performing at Club 505 in Hegewisch as aired on WJOB.

=== The 1960s, 70s and 80s ===
On December 30, 1960, the station was sold to Julian Colby and became The Colby Broadcasting Corporation. Judy Grambo started a program called "The Ladies Program" and eventually became the President and Station Manager of WJOB. Mr. Colby and Ms. Grambo would guide the station to prominence for 26 years.

Until just before the end of the 1990s, WJOB continued as a regional staple for local news and information. Personalities Larry Peterson, and later Thurm Ferree, Mike Bonaventura, Greg Doffin and others continued to provide quality local programming for WJOB's audience, just as did Irv Lewin until his 1995 death. As the 1990s drew to a close, however, WJOB floundered soon after M&M Broadcasting, owners for the past 13 years, ceded control of the station to George and Norma Stevens of St. George Broadcasting. Through staff changes, as it tried to continue to be relevant to local trends and demands, treasured local personalities were dismissed. By the early 2000s, WJOB had all but gone off the air.

=== The 2000s ===
The station was purchased by a partnership composed of Vazquez Development LLC and Ric Federighi in 2004. Several local and syndicated programming formats have aired. Steven 'The Preacher' Glover, hosted a very popular afternoon show. The September 2008 Northwest Indiana flood catapulted WJOB back into the local consciousness with its 24-hour coverage of emergency evacuations and local leaders' messages to the public. WJOB continued to relay important notices about the flood and host several local leaders to give their views of the natural disaster. WJOB also revived its tradition of hosting politicians with its coverage of then Democratic candidate Barack Obama's rallies in Gary, Indiana and Highland, Indiana at Wicker Memorial Park. With this rebirth, WJOB recommitted itself to local broadcasting with nearly 90% local programming. Syndicated shows such as Dave Ramsey and Lou Dobbs would fill the remaining ten percent. Listener-assisted concepts such as the Citizens Traffic Authority and the Community Programming Initiative gave WJOB's local audience an unprecedented role in on-air participation.

By the end of 2010, all syndicated programming had been forgone and live local programming became the station's focus. WJOB boasted nearly eighteen hours of live local programming with the remainder being dedicated to "Region Flashbacks," archived soundbites from previous shows. As of April 2012, WJOB reintroduced syndicated programming with The Mike Huckabee Show. WJOB continued as the "Sports Voice of the Region" with its dedication to local and Big Ten sports events and was one of the first local radio stations to broadcast WFA (Women's Football Association) games featuring the Chicago Force and Collegiate Baseball League baseball featuring the NWI Oilmen games. WJOB has been a member of the Purdue University Sports Broadcast Network since the 1960s and continues to broadcast Purdue football and men's basketball games in season. WJOB broadcasts over 150 local high school baseball, basketball, football, hockey, soccer, and softball games per calendar year, many produced in-house and some as an affiliate of the Regional Radio Sports Network

In February 2012, longtime host Steven "The Preacher" Glover died suddenly at his home. The station, in addition to The Preacher's listeners, mourned his death, and the after-effects left the station in a quandary concerning the popular afternoon slot. In March 2012, comedian Nick Gaza was tapped to host the 4-6 p.m. show. The afternoon show underwent further change in September 2012, when Ron Harlow, Larry "the K," and 'Big' George Vincent split hosting duties on the renamed "The Afternoon Scramble." As of February 2013, the afternoon slot was filled with "The Afternoon Fix" hosted by Ron Harlow.

In the fall of 2013, WJOB re-joined the Indiana University Sports Radio Network, airing games that do not conflict with Purdue University Sports Radio Network broadcasts. Also in the fall of 2013, WJOB began broadcasting out-of-market NFL games and out-of-market NCAA Football games.

== Former station personalities ==
John Whitaker, WJOB sportscaster, is the only person in the country who made play by play broadcasts of Nine Tournament Basketball games in one day, without assistance. He set the record in 1944 and again in 1945.

Other personalities who worked at WJOB early in their careers include Jean Shepherd, Frank Reynolds (later with ABC News), Emery King (later with NBC News, WBBM-TV and WDIV-TV), Steve King (later at WLS, now at WGN), Melissa McGurren (now co-host of the Melissa and Austin morning show on WUSN), Tommy Williams, (formerly of WSCR 670) and Felicia Middlebrooks (now at WBBM).

== Translator ==
Call sign	Frequency	City of license	FID	ERP (W)	HAAT	Class	Transmitter coordinates	FCC info
W284CY	104.7 FM	Hammond, Indiana	151550	250	119 m (390 ft)	D	41°35′49.1″N 87°28′45.1″W	LMS
