= Steve King (radio) =

Steve King (born July 26, 1943) is a broadcast personality who has been heard on several different stations, mostly in the Chicago area. For more than 25 years, King and his wife, Johnnie Putman, hosted The Steve and Johnnie Show overnights on WGN.

After ten years on the road and in recording studios as a rock singer/guitarist, King's broadcast career started in 1966 at WJOB in Hammond, Indiana. After a stint at WLTH in nearby Gary, King spent two years in Indianapolis at WIBC and WNAP-FM, his only foray outside the Chicago market. He returned to the Windy City to work afternoon drive time at WBBM-FM, then moved to WLS in 1973, where he spent five years working the late evening slot. He left that job for the new format of talk radio at WIND-AM in 1978, where he stayed until 1984 (with a brief detour to WDAI). It was at WIND that he met Putman, a fellow show host.

On Christmas Eve, in 1984, King moved to WGN, and on Valentine's Day 1985 Putman followed. Putman's initial work included traffic reporting on WGN's morning show. Steve and Johnnie were paired as a broadcast team initially on weekends and ultimately segued to the overnight show. Their show became the top-rated overnight show in the market. It began as a three-and-a-half-hour show, then became four hours, then five, then six, and then five hours again.

Because of WGN's clear channel signal, their show has been heard throughout most of the United States and Canada, and their show (along with all of WGN's programming, except for Chicago Cubs games) has also been webcast.

As avid fans of the guitar, King and Putman have often featured guests which are well known for their guitar work, including Les Paul, Tommy Emmanuel and Doyle Dykes.

Steve and Johnnie completed their 5,000th show together on August 17–18, 2006. On December 4–5, 2011, they announced that they were leaving WGN following their program of December 8–9, wrapping after 6,207 shows.

After leaving WGN, Steve and Johnnie's first book was published. The book, "A Little More Les," is a personal memoir of their long-time friendship with the legendary Les Paul.

In 2013, Steve and Johnnie returned to WGN radio for a few shows during the Christmas holiday season. Since then, they have continued to maintain their residence as part of the WGN Radio family with, what they call, occasional “drive-by” shows and guest appearances. Steve and Johnnie will return to WGN on January 7, 2023, as hosts of a five-hour Saturday night program.

King has been diagnosed with celiac sprue, an intolerance to gluten. Since his diagnosis, King has become involved in local and national organizations which fight the disease.
