= WLTH =

- Gary, Indiana; United States
- Frequency: 1370 kHz
- Branding: Wea-LTH Radio

Programming
- Format: Urban Adult Contemporary

Ownership
- Owner: WLTH Radio

History
- First air date: November 5, 1950
- Former call signs: WGRY (1949-1964)
- Call sign meaning: WeaLTH

Technical information
- Licensing authority: FCC
- Facility ID: 38402
- Class: D
- Power: 1,000 watts day 9 watts night
- Transmitter coordinates: 41°34′20″N 87°19′5″W
- Translator: 92.7 W224EA (Gary)

Links
- Public license information: Public file; LMS
- Website: wlthradio.com

WLTH (1370 AM) is a radio station in Gary, Indiana east of the Chicago metropolitan area. It is owned by Michilliana Broadcasting, LLC. The station's current format is Urban Adult Contemporary

Notable radio alumni of WLTH include Steve King (later of WLS, and now with WGN); Felicia Middlebrooks (retired from WBBM); Michael King (now with WXIA-TV); Tommy Williams (later of WSCR); Dinahlynn Biggs over 38 years on air with more than 500,000 listeners of the popular show:The Dinahlynn Biggs Show until June 2017 now on Chicago Radio, R.Veronica Williams (later with Chicago Public Radio WBEZ 91.5 FM later of Radio-One Indianapolis WLTC AM 1310 "The Light"/106.7 WTLC-FM.

In September 2013, the station changed its location from Merrillville, Indiana, to its original city of Gary- specifically, 478 Broadway and then moved to 115 W. 5th Avenue in 2016.

Logo before translator sign on
