= Morningside Historic District =

Historic district in Indiana, United States

- U.S. National Register of Historic Places
- U.S. Historic district
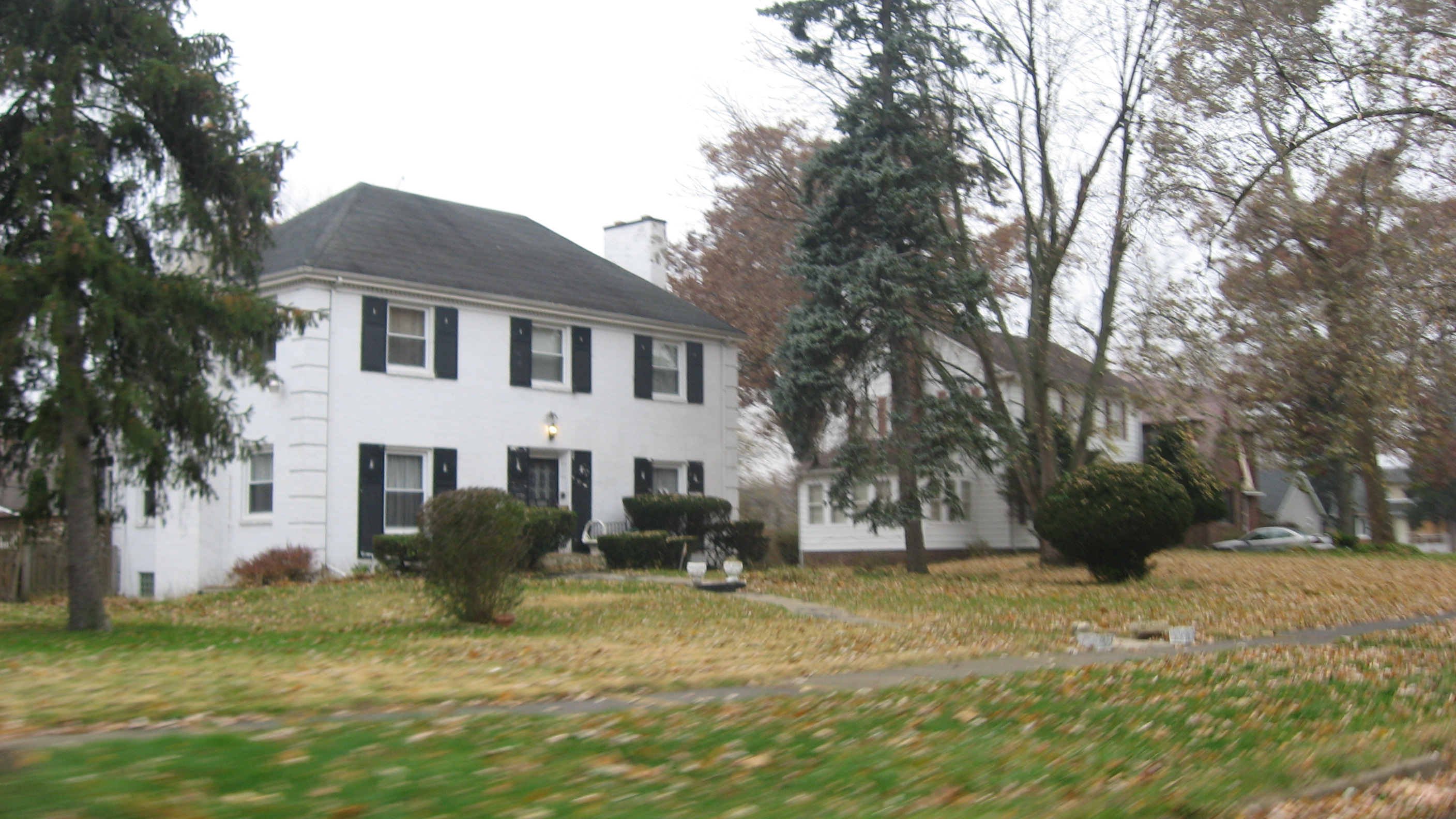
- Houses on 46th Avenue

- Location within Indiana Location within the United States
- Location: Roughly bounded by the eastern side of Washington, the western side of Jefferson, and 47th and 48th Sts., Gary, Indiana
- Coordinates: 41°31′56″N 87°20′19″W
- Area: 36 acres (15 ha)
- Architect: Hess, Louis C.
- Architectural style: Colonial Revival, Tudor Revival
- MPS: Historic Residential Suburbs in the United States, 1830-1960 MPS
- NRHP reference No.: 09000758
- Added to NRHP: September 24, 2009

Morningside Historic District is a national historic district located at Gary, Indiana. The district is characterized by spacious lots and tree-shaded curving streets. It encompasses 99 contributing buildings and 1 contributing site.

Morningside developed early in the 20th century as a secluded area for middle and upper class residents. Construction in the neighborhood spanned nearly 40 years – from 1917 to 1953 – creating an architectural collection ranging from English cottages and Tudor Revival style manors to post-war ranch houses. The area was named to the National Register of Historic Places by the Partners in Preservation program. Funded by local preservation advocate Jim Morrow, the program pays for professional preparation of National Register nominations for qualifying structures in Lake and Porter counties.

It was listed in the National Register of Historic Places in 2009.
