= West Fifth Avenue Apartments Historic District =

Historic district in Indiana, United States

- U.S. National Register of Historic Places
- U.S. Historic district
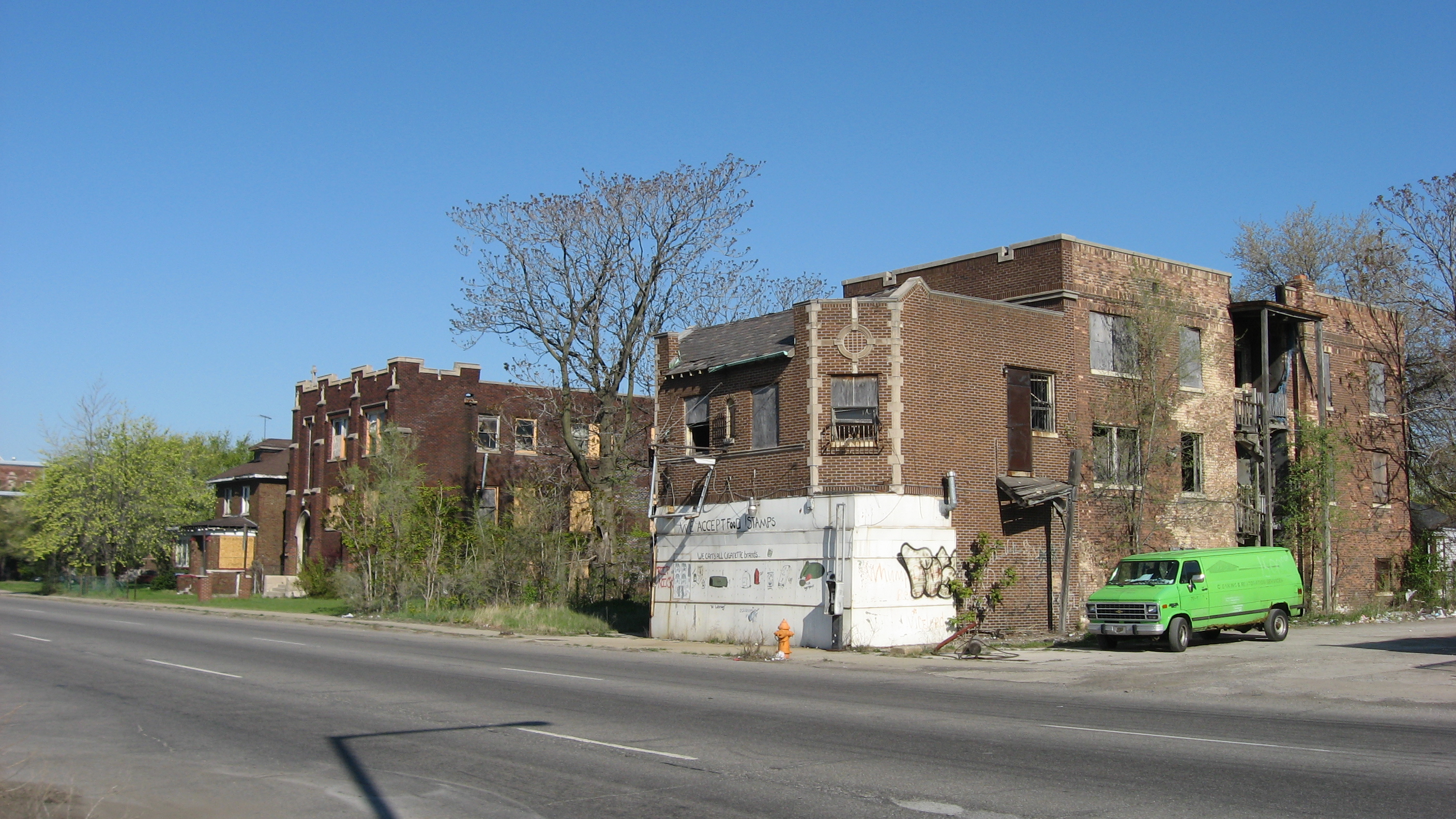
- West Fifth Avenue Apartments, April 2012

- Location within Indiana Location within the United States
- Location: Roughly 5th Ave. from Taft to Pierce St., Gary, Indiana
- Coordinates: 41°36′06″N 87°21′29″W
- Area: 20.5 acres (8.3 ha)
- Architect: Multiple
- Architectural style: Late 19th And 20th Century Revivals, Chicago, The Commercial Style
- NRHP reference No.: 84001076
- Added to NRHP: May 17, 1984

West Fifth Avenue Apartments Historic District is a national historic district located at Gary, Indiana. The district encompasses 30 contributing buildings in a residential section of Gary. The buildings were built between 1922 and 1928, and consist of a dense group of brick apartment blocks mostly four stories tall. Architectural styles include examples of Colonial Revival, Renaissance Revival, Late Gothic Revival, and Commercial style architecture.

It was listed in the National Register of Historic Places in 1984.
