= Combs Addition Historic District =

Historic district in Indiana, United States

- U.S. National Register of Historic Places
- U.S. Historic district
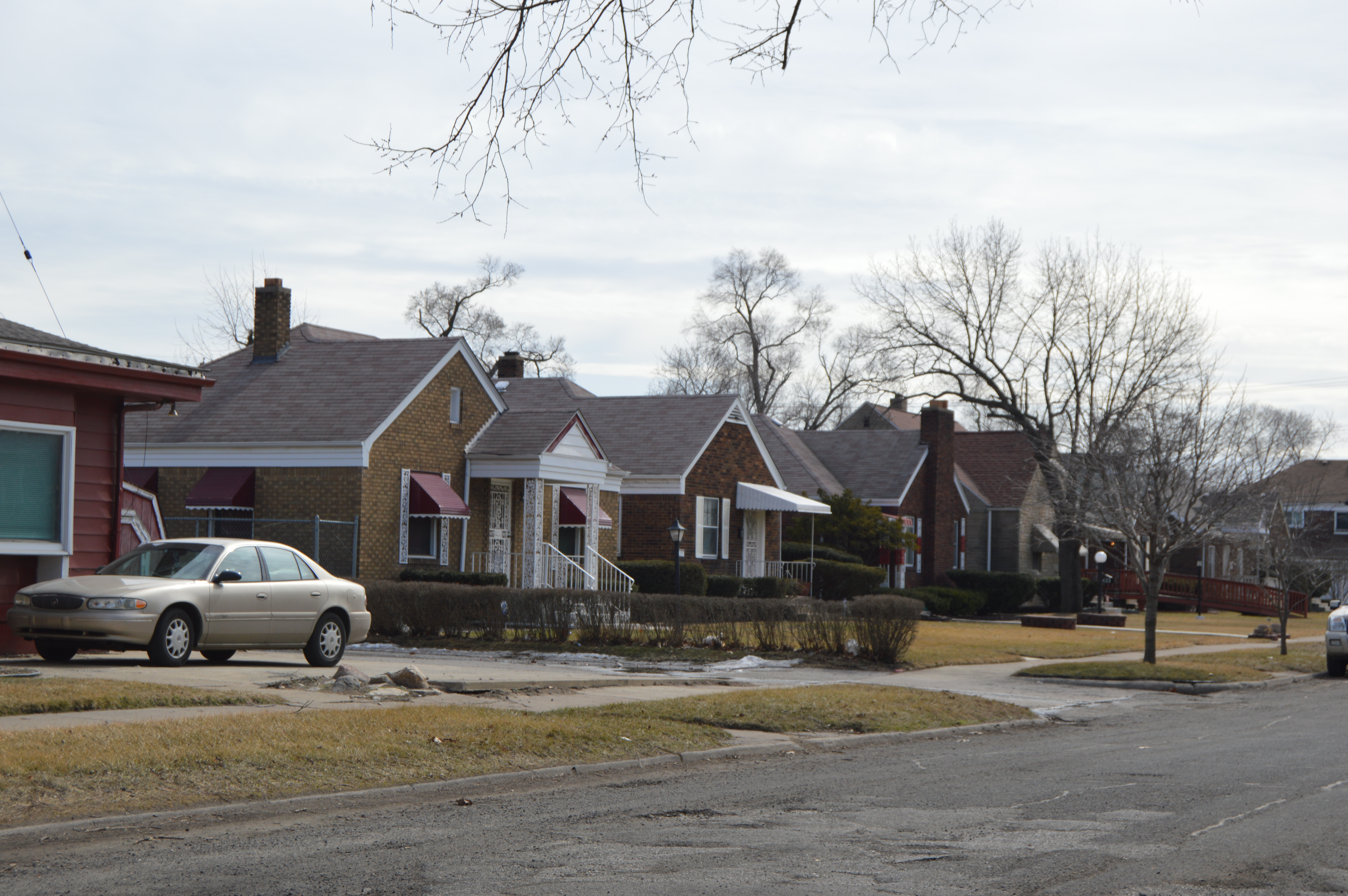
- Ellsworth south of Fourth, March 2015

- Location within Indiana Location within the United States
- Location: 400 and 500 blocks of Rutledge and Ellsworth Sts., and the 500 block of Marshall St. between 4th and 6th Aves., Gary, Indiana
- Coordinates: 41°36′10″N 87°22′10″W
- Area: 21.11 acres (8.54 ha)
- Built: 1928-1959
- Architect: Combs, Leslie
- Architectural style: Colonial Revival, Tudor Revival, American Small House
- MPS: Historic Residential Suburbs in the United States, 1830-1960 MPS
- NRHP reference No.: 14000805
- Added to NRHP: September 30, 2014

Combs Addition Historic District is a national historic district located at Gary, Indiana. The district encompasses 99 contributing buildings in an exclusively residential section of Gary. They were built between 1928 and 1959 and are examples of the American Small House cottage movement with Colonial Revival and Tudor Revival design elements.

It was listed in the National Register of Historic Places in 2014.
