= Barney Sablotney House =

Historic house in Indiana, United States

- U.S. National Register of Historic Places
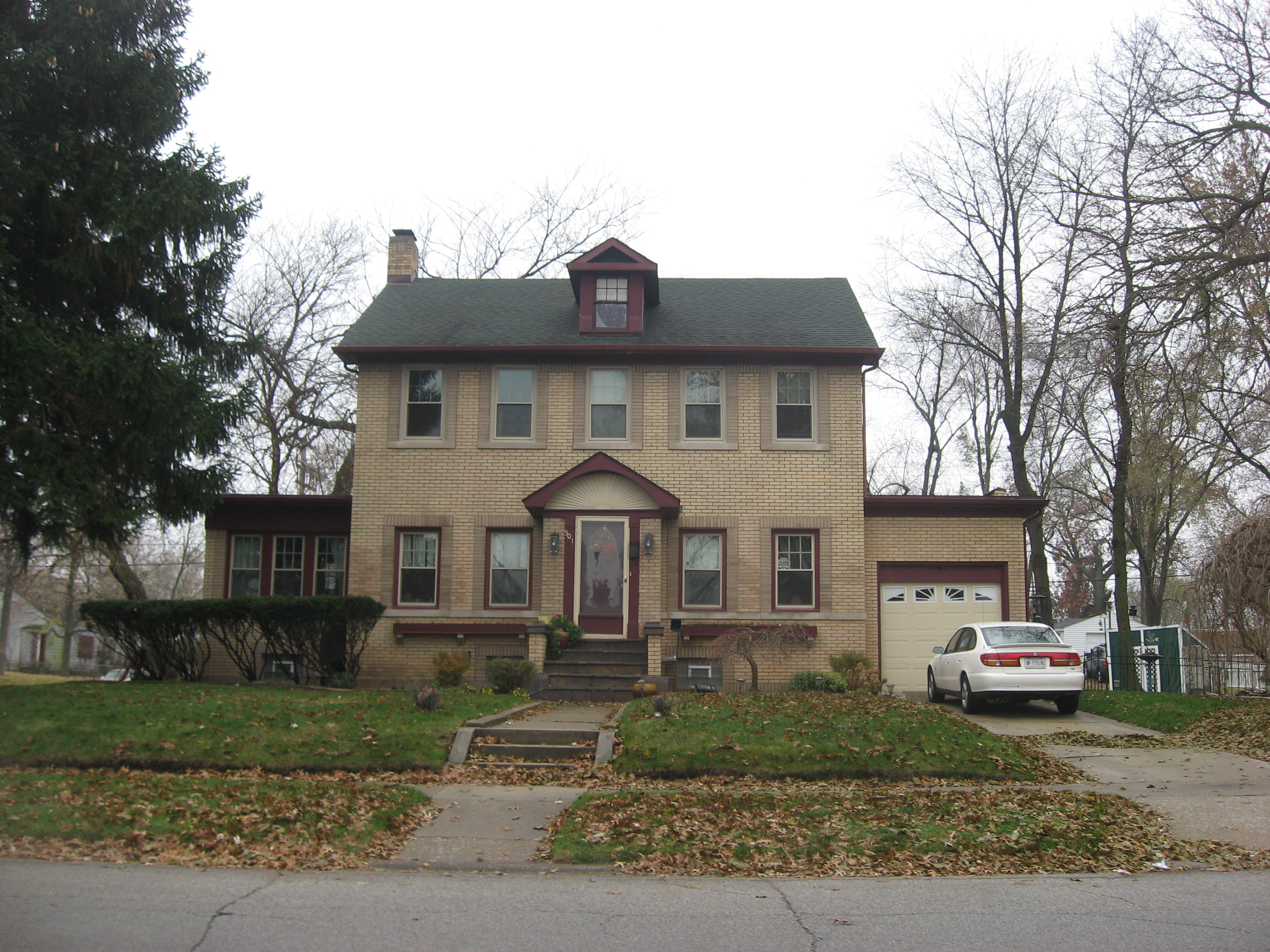
- Barney Sablotney House, November 2013

- Location within Indiana Location within the United States
- Location: 501 W. 47th St., Gary, Indiana
- Coordinates: 41°31′59″N 87°20′33″W
- Area: 0.32 acres (0.13 ha)
- Built: 1928
- Architect: Largura, John
- Architectural style: Colonial Revival
- NRHP reference No.: 12001061
- Added to NRHP: December 19, 2012

Barney Sablotney House is a historic home located at Gary, Indiana. It was built in 1928, and is a 2 1/2-story, five bay by two bay, Colonial Revival style frame dwelling sheathed in yellow glazed brick. The main block is flanked by one-story wings.

It was listed in the National Register of Historic Places in 2012.
