= Lincoln Street Historic District (Gary, Indiana) =

Historic district in Indiana, United States

- U.S. National Register of Historic Places
- U.S. Historic district
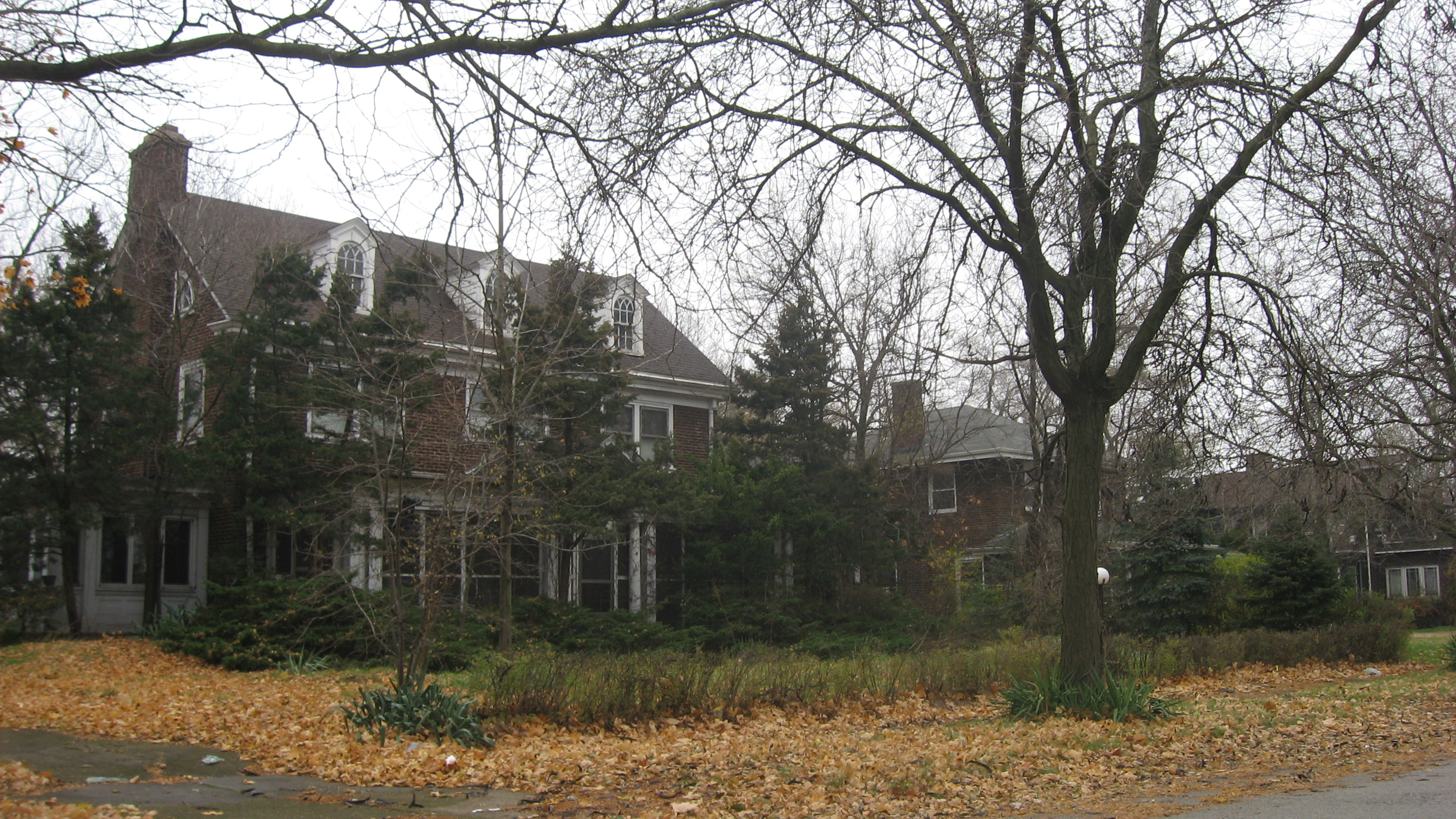
- Lincoln Street, 600 block, November 2013

- Location within Indiana Location within the United States
- Location: Roughly bounded by Fillmore and Hayes Sts. and 6th and 8th Aves., Gary, Indiana
- Coordinates: 41°35′57″N 87°21′17″W
- Area: 85 acres (34 ha)
- Built: 1914
- Architectural style: Colonial Revival, Late Gothic Revival, Mission Revival, Bungalow/Craftsman
- MPS: Historic Residential Suburbs in the United States, 1830-1960 MPS
- NRHP reference No.: 13001012
- Added to NRHP: December 31, 2013

Lincoln Street Historic District is a national historic district located at Gary, Indiana. The district encompasses 239 contributing buildings in an exclusively residential section of Gary. They were largely built between 1910 and 1950, and many reflect the American Small House Movement. Architectural styles include examples of Colonial Revival, Late Gothic Revival, Spanish Colonial Revival, and Bungalow / American Craftsman architecture.

It was listed in the National Register of Historic Places in 2013.
