= Eskilson Historic District =

Historic district in Indiana, United States

- U.S. National Register of Historic Places
- U.S. Historic district
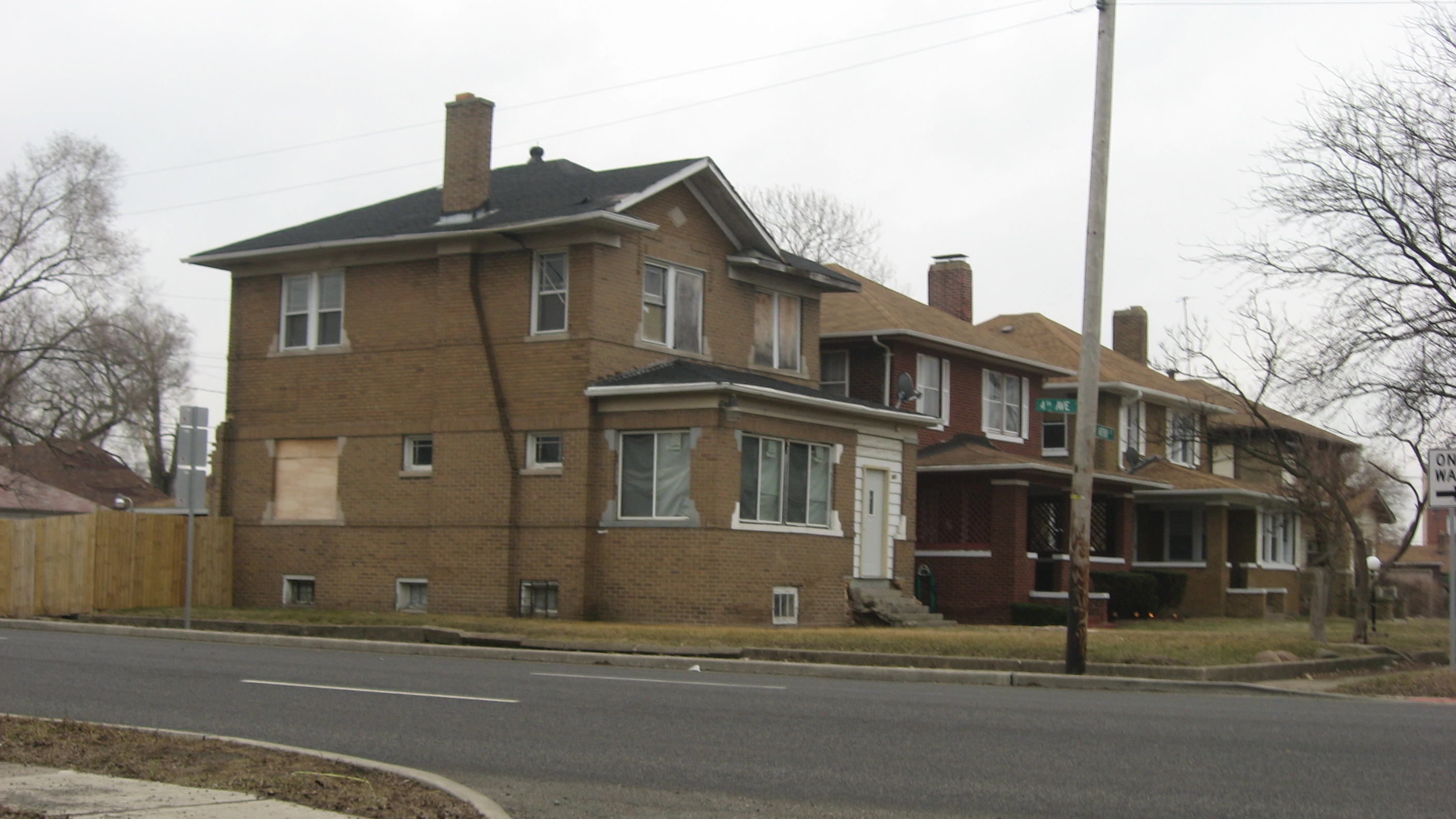
- Fourth and Arthur, March 2014

- Location within Indiana Location within the United States
- Location: Roughly bounded by W. 3rd Ave. and the alleys between Garfield and Hayes Sts., W. 4th Pl., and W. 5th Ave., Cleveland St., and McKinley St., Gary, Indiana
- Coordinates: 41°36′13″N 87°21′37″W
- Area: 20.5 acres (8.3 ha)
- Built: 1920
- Architectural style: Colonial Revival, Tudor Revival, Mission Revival, Bungalow/Craftsman
- MPS: Historic Residential Suburbs in the United States, 1830-1960 MPS
- NRHP reference No.: 14000073
- Added to NRHP: March 26, 2014

Eskilson Historic District is a national historic district located at Gary, Indiana. The district encompasses 97 contributing buildings in an exclusively residential section of Gary. They were built during the 1920s and 1930s, and include examples of Colonial Revival, Tudor Revival, Mission Revival, and Bungalow / American Craftsman architecture.

It was listed in the National Register of Historic Places in 2014.
