= Gary, Indiana =

City in Lake County, Indiana

- City
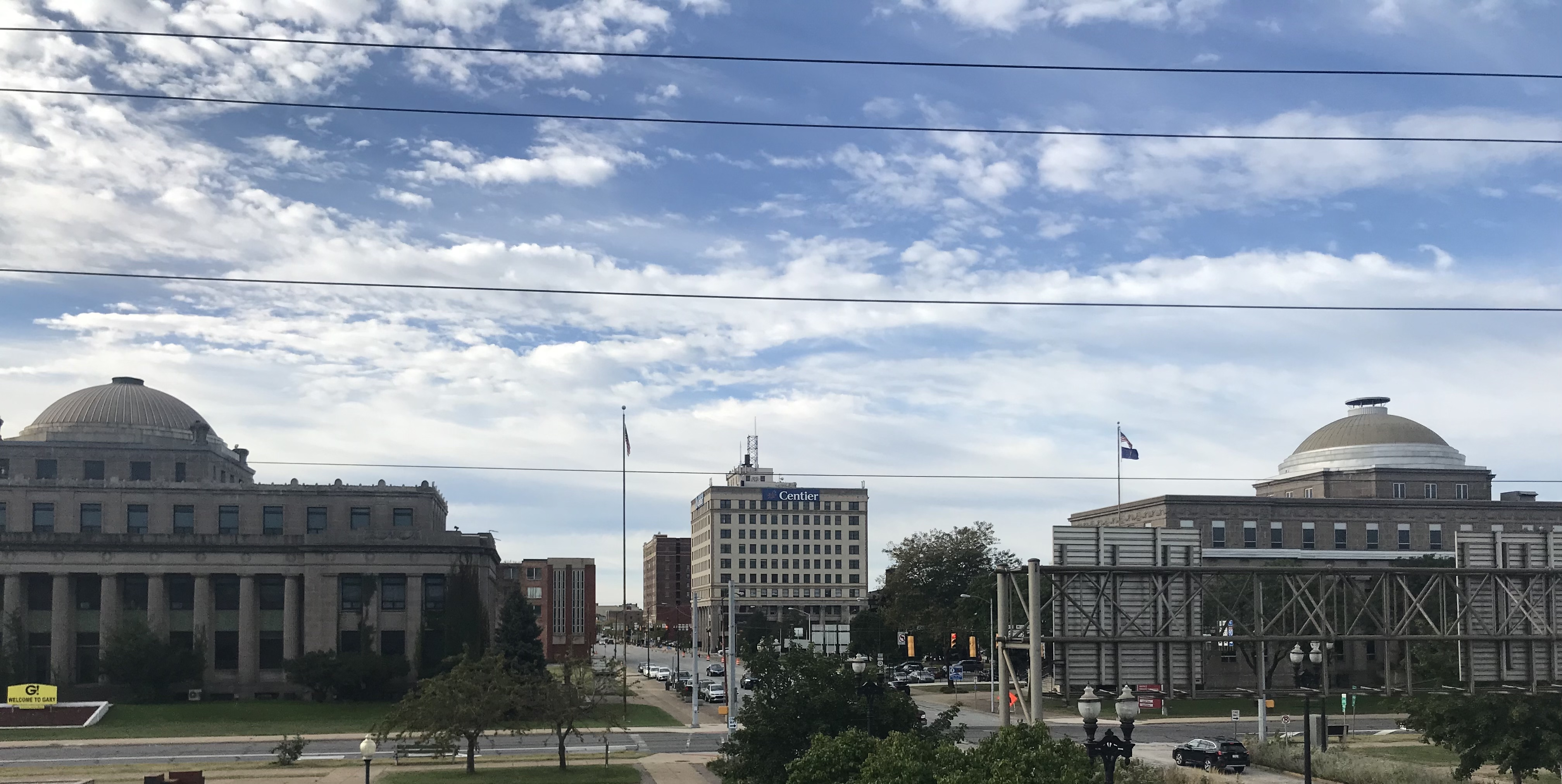
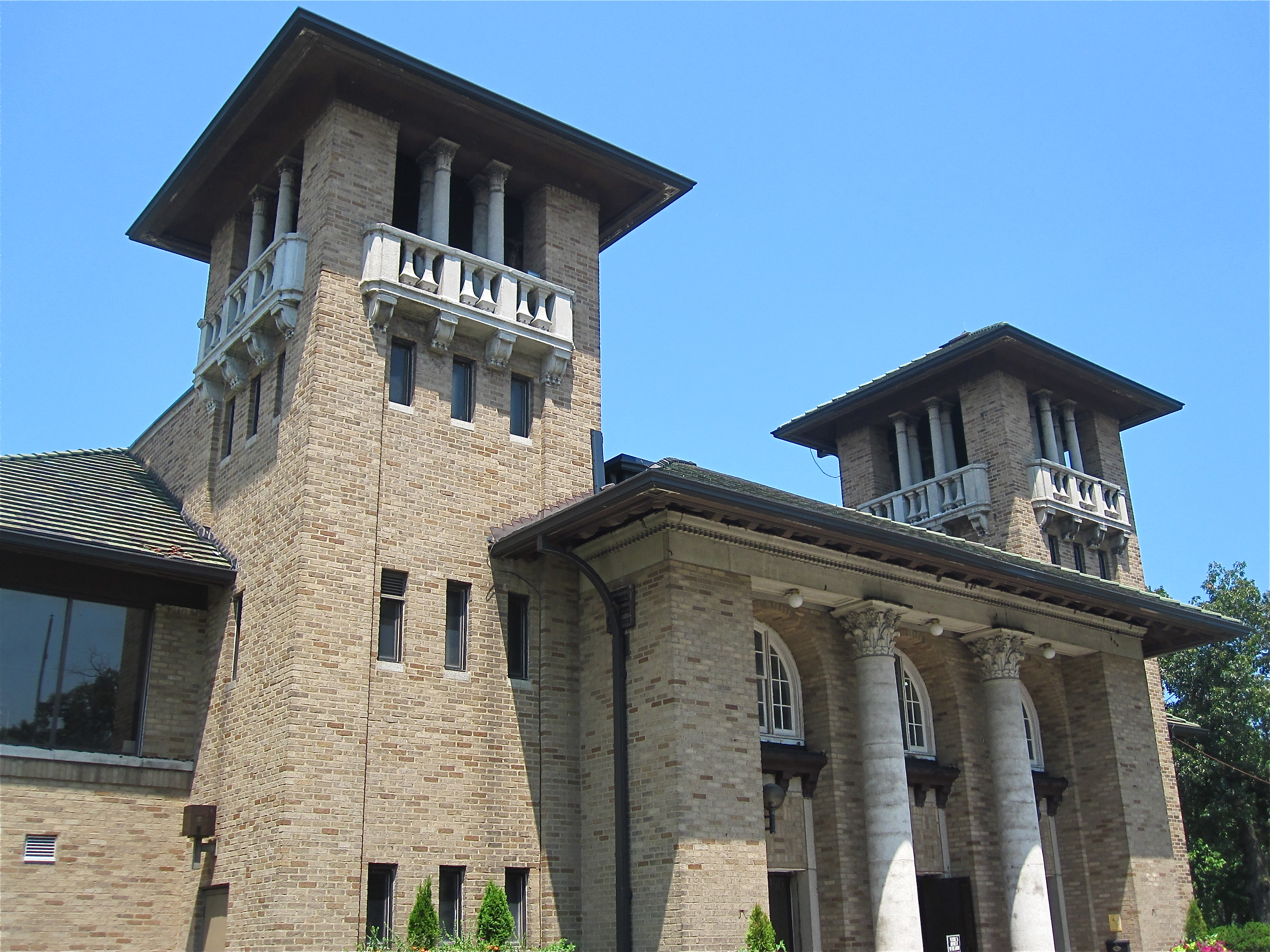
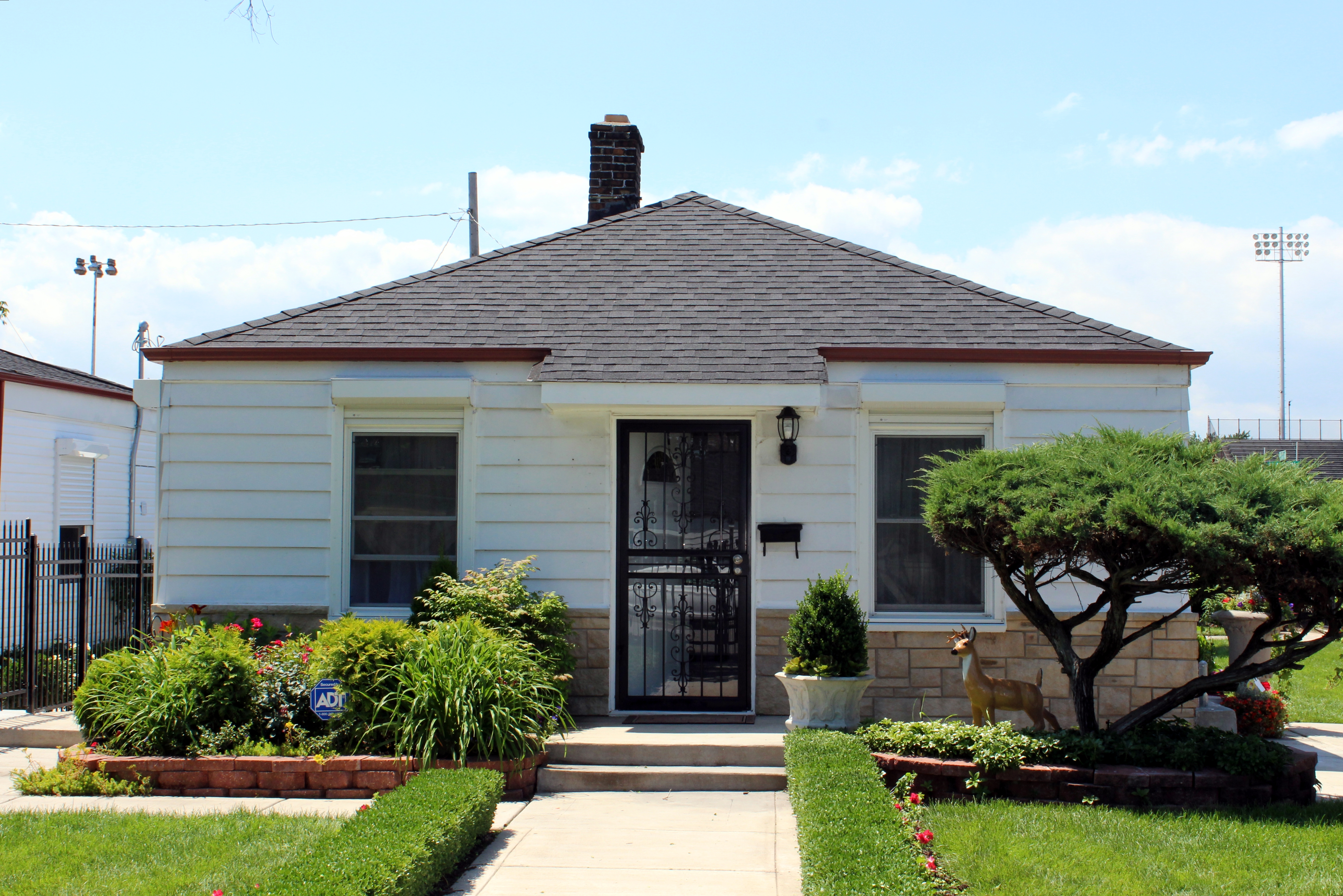
- Downtown Gary Marquette Park Jackson family home

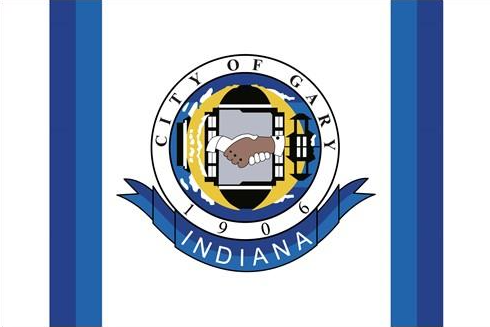
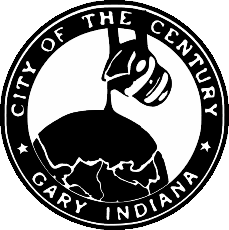
- Flag Seal
- Nicknames: City of the Century, Magic City, Steel City
- Motto: "We Are Doing Great Things"
- Interactive map of Gary, Indiana
- Location within Indiana Location within the United States
- Coordinates: 41°35′26″N 87°20′49″W
- Country: United States
- State: Indiana
- County: Lake
- Townships: Calumet, Hobart
- Established: 1906
- Incorporated: July 14, 1906
- Named for: Elbert Henry Gary

Government
  - Type: Strong mayor–council
  - Body: City council
  - Mayor: Eddie Melton (D)
  - City Clerk: Suzette Raggs

Area
  - Total: 50.663 sq mi (131.217 km^{2})
  - Land: 49.932 sq mi (129.323 km^{2})
  - Water: 7.312 sq mi (18.938 km^{2})
- Elevation: 597 ft (182 m)

Population (2020)
  - Total: 69,093
  - Estimate (2025): 67,289
  - Rank: US: 566th IN: 11th
  - Density: 1,385.6/sq mi (534.97/km^{2})
- Time zone: UTC−6 (Central (CST))
  - Summer (DST): UTC−5 (CDT)
- ZIP Codes: 46401–46411
- Area code: 219
- FIPS code: 18-27000
- GNIS feature ID: 2394863
- Website: gary.gov

Gary is a city in Lake County, Indiana, United States. The population was 69,093 at the 2020 census, making it Indiana's eleventh-most populous city. The city has been historically dominated by major industrial activity and is home to U.S. Steel's Gary Works, the largest steel mill complex in North America. Gary is located in the Chicago metropolitan area along the southern shore of Lake Michigan about 25 miles (40 km) southeast of Chicago. The city is the western gateway to the Indiana Dunes National Park.

Gary was named after lawyer Elbert Henry Gary, who was the founding chairman of the United States Steel Corporation. U.S. Steel had established the city in 1906 as a company town to serve its steel mills. Since the 1970s, Gary and other Rust Belt cities have lost a high number of people as the steel industry has gone through restructuring and manufacturing jobs moved out of the United States. As a result of this economic shift, the city's population has declined 61% since the 1960 census.

Although initially a very diverse city, Gary currently has one of the United States's highest percentages of African Americans. Between 1970 and 2010, Gary had the nation's highest Black population per capita. The city has a legacy of African-American cultural and historical accomplishments. In 1945, Gary was the first city in the Midwest (and one of the first in the United States) to fully integrate its public school system. It elected the country's first Black mayor, Richard Hatcher in 1967, and in 1972 hosted the first and largest National Black Political Convention.

Gary is served by the Gary/Chicago International Airport, an alternative to the Chicago region's two larger airports. The city's public transport is provided by the Gary Public Transportation Corporation and the South Shore Line passenger railway, which connects to the Chicago transit system. It is home to a professional baseball team, the Gary SouthShore RailCats. In addition to its large steel mills, the city is known as the birthplace of the Jackson family, well-known entertainers whose members include singers Michael and Janet Jackson.

== History ==
=== Founding and early years ===
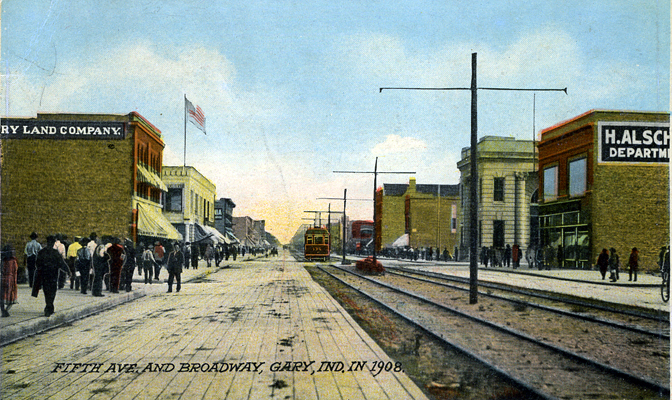
5th Ave. and Broadway in 1908

Gary, Indiana, was founded in 1906 by the U.S. Steel corporation as the home for its new plant, Gary Works. The city was named after lawyer Elbert Henry Gary, who was the founding chairman of the United States Steel Corporation.

Gary was the site of civil unrest in the 1919 General Steel Strike. On October 4, 1919, a riot broke out on Broadway, the main north–south street through downtown Gary, between steel workers and strike breakers brought in from outside. Indiana governor James P. Goodrich declared martial law three days later. Shortly after that, over 4,000 federal troops under the command of Major General Leonard Wood arrived to restore order.

The steel industry's jobs provided Gary with rapid growth and a diverse population within the first 26 years of its founding. In the 1920 United States census, 29.7% of Gary's population was classified as foreign-born, mostly from eastern European countries, with another 30.8% native-born with at least one foreign-born parent. By the 1930 United States census, the first census in which Gary's population exceeded 100,000, the city was the fifth largest in Indiana and comparable in size to South Bend, Fort Wayne, and Evansville.

In 1930, 78.7% of the population was classified as white, with 19.3% as foreign-born and another 25.9% as native-born with at least one foreign-born parent. In addition to white internal migrants, Gary had attracted numerous African-American migrants from the South in the Great Migration, and 17.8% of the population was classified as black. Some 3.5% were classified as Mexican, now likely to be identified as Hispanic, as they included citizens and immigrants of other Spanish-speaking ethnicities.

=== Post-World War II ===
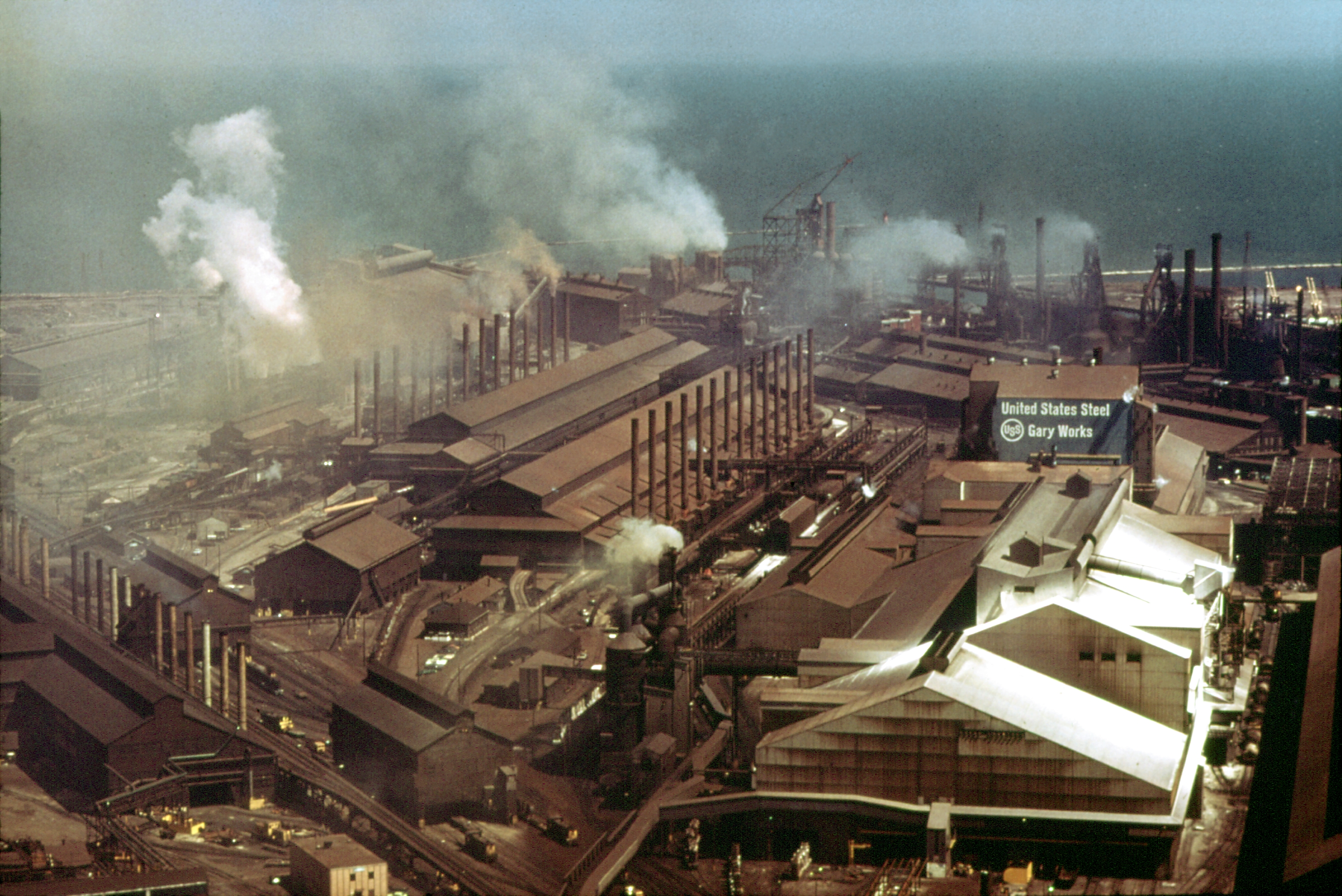
U.S. Steel's Gary Works in 1973

Gary's fortunes have risen and fallen with those of the steel industry. The growth of the steel industry brought prosperity to the community, and industrial workers gained middle-class standards of living. Broadway was known as a commercial center for the region. Department stores and architecturally significant movie houses were built in the downtown and Glen Park neighborhoods.

In the 1960s, as manufacturing jobs moved out of the United States, Gary entered a period of decline. This also occurred in many other American urban centers that were reliant on one particular industry. Gary's decline was brought on by reduced employment in the steel industry overall, which caused U.S. Steel to lay off many workers from the Gary area.

The U.S. Steel Gary Works employed over 30,000 in 1970. The workforce declined to 6,000 by 1990, and to 5,100 by August 2015. Attempts to shore up the city's economy with major construction projects, such as a Holiday Inn hotel and the Genesis Convention Center, failed to reverse the decline.

=== 1968 riots ===
In July 1968, riots broke out in Gary following the assassination of Martin Luther King Jr. The governor ordered 3,000 National Guard members to assist local police with restoring order to the city. Curfews were enforced, and a ban on gasoline and liquor sales helped calm the violence. During the unrest, more than 110 people were arrested, at least three stores were set on fire, and at least 15 fire-bombings were reported.

=== Racial changes ===
A rapid racial change occurred in Gary during the late 20th century. Political power reflected Gary's racial demographics: the Black and Hispanic share of the city's population increased from 21% in 1930 to 39% in 1960, and to 53% in 1970. Black and Hispanic people primarily lived in the Midtown section just south of downtown. In the 1950 Census, 97% of Gary's black population lived in this neighborhood.

In 1968, Gary voters elected one of the nation's first African-American mayors, Richard G. Hatcher, and hosted the groundbreaking 1972 National Black Political Convention.

In the late 1990s and early 2000s, Gary had the highest percentage of African-American residents among U.S. cities with a population of 100,000 or more, at 84% in the 2000 census.

Gary's population has fallen well below 100,000 residents. In 2013, the Gary Department of Redevelopment estimated that one-third of all homes in the city were unoccupied or abandoned.

=== U.S. Steel ===
U.S. Steel continues to be a major steel producer but has a small fraction of its previous workforce. The plant and allied facilities employed over 30,000 people in the early 1970s, but only 6,000 in 1990 and 2,246 in 2023.

While Gary has been unable to establish or replace the manufacturing base, it has worked to diversify. Two casinos opened along the Gary lakeshore in the 1990s, to create an entertainment destination. Their success was adversely affected by the eleven-year closure of the Cline Avenue Bridge, an important means of access to the area. It reopened in 2020 as a privately managed entity.

Today, Gary faces the difficulties of a Rust Belt city, including high unemployment and decaying infrastructure.

=== 21st century ===
Gary has closed 21 public schools. While some school buildings have been reused, most remain unused since closing, and have been subjected to vandalism. As of 2014, Gary was considering closing additional schools in response to budget deficits.

Gary Chief of Police Thomas Houston was convicted of excessive force and abuse of authority in 2008. He died in 2010 while serving a three-year, five-month federal prison sentence.

In April 2011, 75-year-old mayor Rudolph M. Clay announced that he would suspend his campaign for reelection as he was being treated for prostate cancer. He endorsed rival Karen Freeman-Wilson, who won the Democratic mayoral primary in May 2011. Freeman-Wilson won election with 87 percent of the vote and her term began in January 2012; she is the first woman elected mayor in the city's history. She was reelected in 2015.

Mayor Freeman-Wilson was defeated in her bid for a third term in the 2019 Democratic primary by Lake County Assessor Jerome Prince. Since no challengers filed for the November 2019 general election, Prince's nomination was effectively tantamount to election. He succeeded Freeman-Wilson in January 2020.

In May 2021, a $300 million Hard Rock Casino opened in Gary. Branded as Hard Rock Casino Northern Indiana, the location includes memorabilia from the local entertainment family, the Jackson 5, and a 1,950-seat Hard Rock Live performance hall.

In August 2026, the city was affected by severe storms and an extended power outage. An estimated 375,000 customers of local utility company NiSource lost service, with approximately 30,000 still without power 12 days later.

== Geography ==
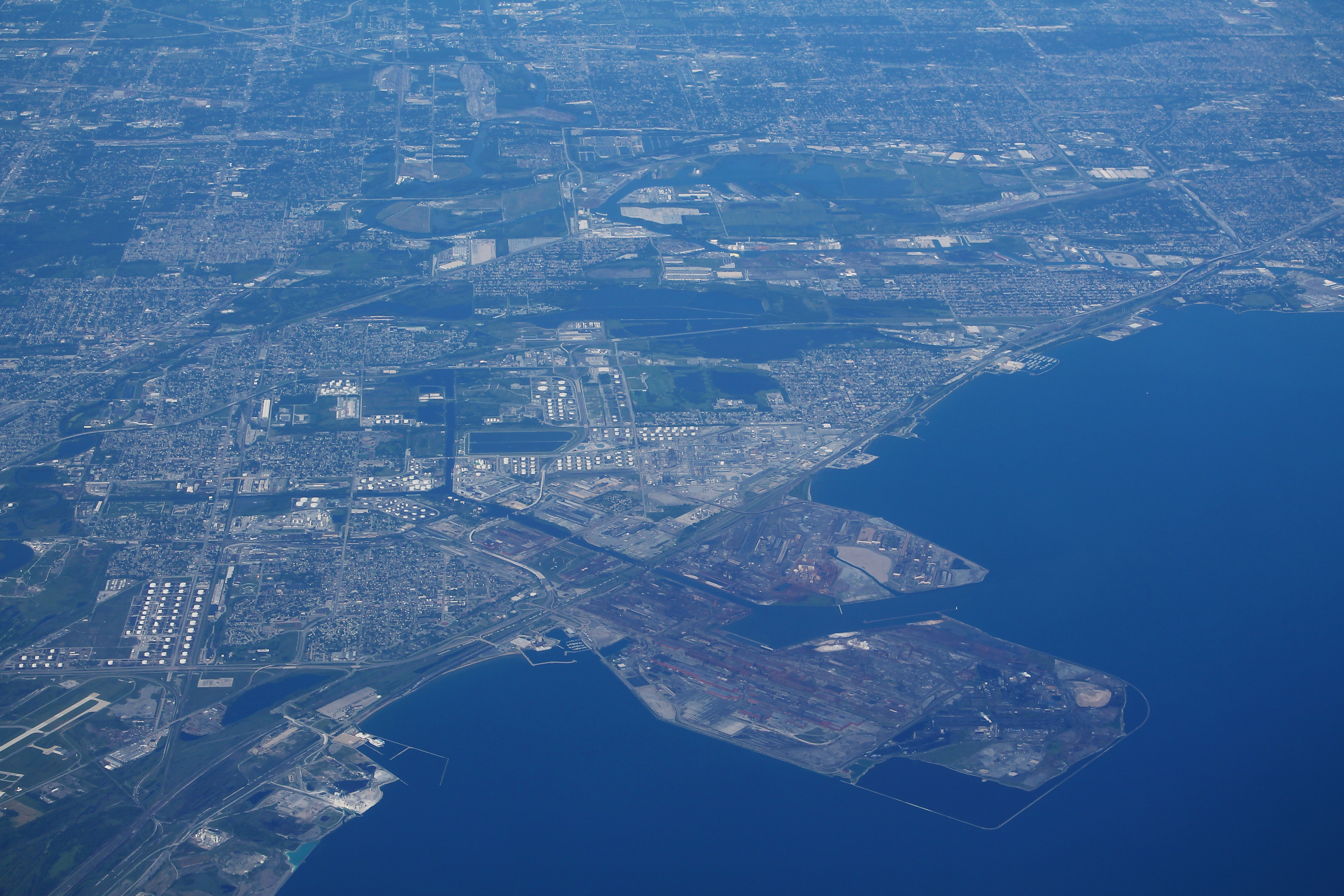
An aerial view of Gary International Airport (lower left corner) and East Chicago

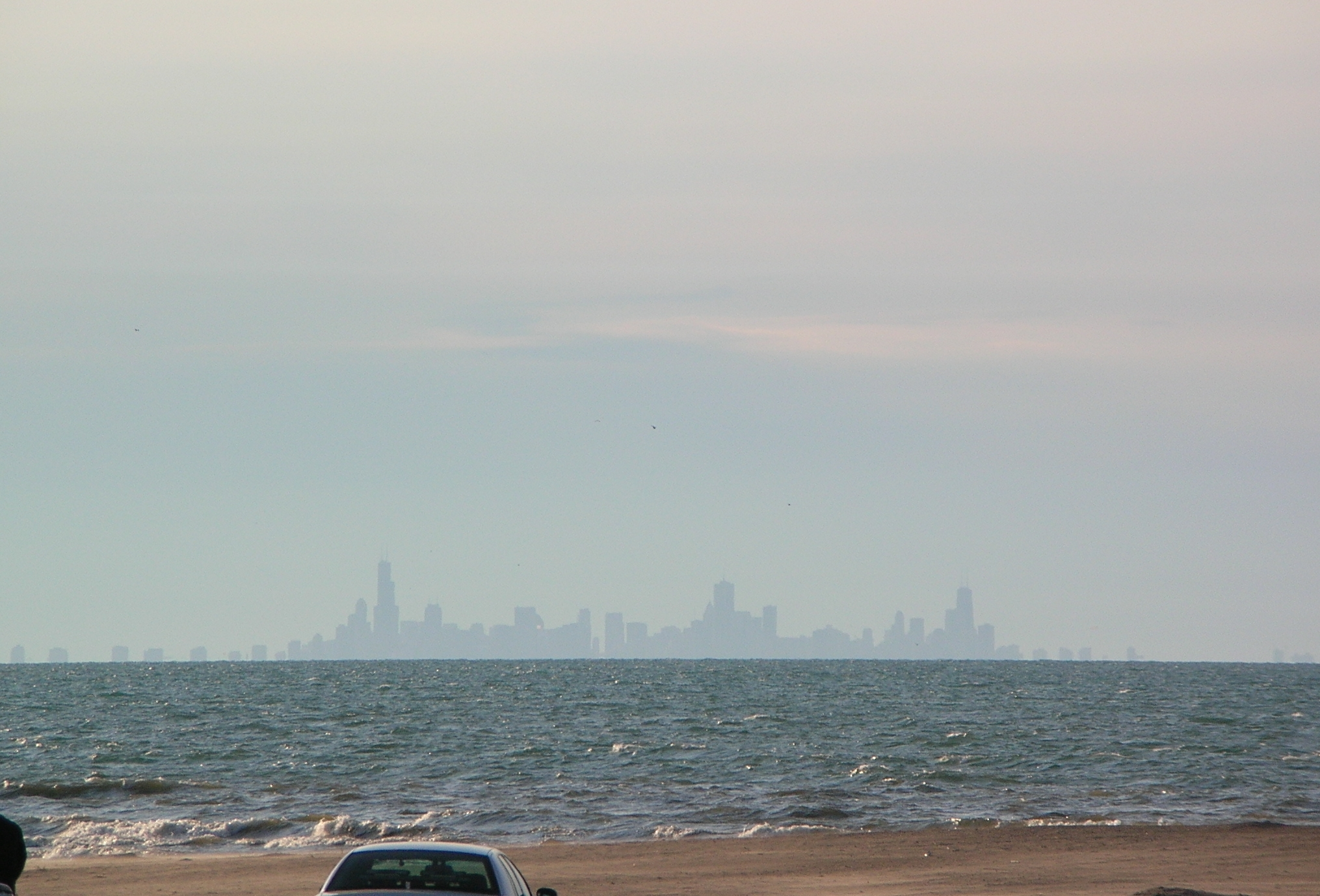
The Chicago skyline viewed across Lake Michigan from Lake Street Beach in Gary's Miller Beach neighborhood

The city is located at the southern end of the former lake bed of the prehistoric Lake Chicago and the current Lake Michigan. Most of the city's soil, nearly one foot below the surface, is pure sand. The sand beneath Gary and on its beaches is of such volume and quality that for over a century, companies have mined it, especially for the manufacture of glass.

According to the United States Census Bureau, the city has a total area of 50.663 square miles (131.22 km^{2}), of which 49.932 square miles (129.32 km^{2}) is land and 0.731 square miles (1.89 km^{2}) is water.

Gary is T-shaped, with its northern border on Lake Michigan. In the northwesternmost section, Gary borders Hammond and East Chicago; 165th Street, one of several roads connecting Hammond and Gary, has been walled off from Gary since 1981, initially due to a toxic flood. Miller Beach, Gary's easternmost neighborhood, borders Lake Station and Portage. Gary's southernmost section borders Griffith, Hobart, Merrillville, and unincorporated Ross. Gary is about 30 miles (48 km) from the Chicago Loop.

Gary contains the western portion of Indiana Dunes National Park, including Miller Woods, the western part of Long Lake, and the Paul H. Douglas Center for Environmental Education. Much of this is within Gary's Miller Beach neighborhood, although the park's western tip extends to downtown Gary.

=== Climate ===
Gary is listed by the Köppen-Geiger climate classification system as humid continental (Dfa). In July and August, the warmest months, high temperatures average 84 °F (29 °C) and peak just above 100 °F (38 °C), and low temperatures average 63 °F (17 °C). In January and February, the coldest months, high temperatures average around 29 °F (−2 °C) and low temperatures average 13 °F (−11 °C), with at least a few days of temperatures dipping below 0 °F (−18 °C).

The weather in Gary is greatly regulated by its proximity to Lake Michigan. Weather varies yearly. In the summer months Gary is humid. The city's yearly precipitation averages about 1016 millimeters (40 inches). Summer is the rainiest season. Winters vary but are predominantly snowy. Snowfall in Gary averages approximately 63.5 centimeters (25 inches) per year. Sometimes large blizzards hit because of "lake effect snow", a phenomenon whereby large amounts of water evaporated from the lake deposit onto the shoreline areas as inordinate amounts of snow.

Climate data for Gary, Indiana
Month	Jan	Feb	Mar	Apr	May	Jun	Jul	Aug	Sep	Oct	Nov	Dec	Year
Record high °F (°C)	70 (21)	70 (21)	81 (27)	92 (33)	100 (38)	106 (41)	104 (40)	102 (39)	103 (39)	92 (33)	84 (29)	67 (19)	106 (41)
Mean daily maximum °F (°C)	31.5 (−0.3)	35.2 (1.8)	44.7 (7.1)	58.4 (14.7)	69.1 (20.6)	79.6 (26.4)	83.8 (28.8)	82.5 (28.1)	75.5 (24.2)	64.6 (18.1)	48.5 (9.2)	35.8 (2.1)	59.1 (15.1)
Mean daily minimum °F (°C)	16.5 (−8.6)	19.9 (−6.7)	29.0 (−1.7)	40.0 (4.4)	49.7 (9.8)	59.9 (15.5)	64.9 (18.3)	63.9 (17.7)	56.0 (13.3)	45.7 (7.6)	33.2 (0.7)	21.9 (−5.6)	41.7 (5.4)
Record low °F (°C)	−22 (−30)	−10 (−23)	−6 (−21)	17 (−8)	25 (−4)	36 (2)	46 (8)	43 (6)	33 (1)	20 (−7)	−1 (−18)	−17 (−27)	−22 (−30)
Average precipitation inches (mm)	1.8 (46)	1.7 (43)	3.3 (84)	3.7 (94)	3.8 (97)	4.5 (110)	3.5 (89)	3.4 (86)	3.9 (99)	2.6 (66)	2.5 (64)	3.0 (76)	37.8 (960)
Average snowfall inches (cm)	7.8 (20)	5.4 (14)	3.0 (7.6)	0.7 (1.8)	0 (0)	0 (0)	0 (0)	0 (0)	0 (0)	0.2 (0.51)	1.7 (4.3)	5.9 (15)	24.7 (63)
Average precipitation days (≥ 0.01 in)	9	9	11	12	12	10	9	8	9	8	10	9	116
Source 1: Weatherbase
Source 2:

=== Neighborhoods ===
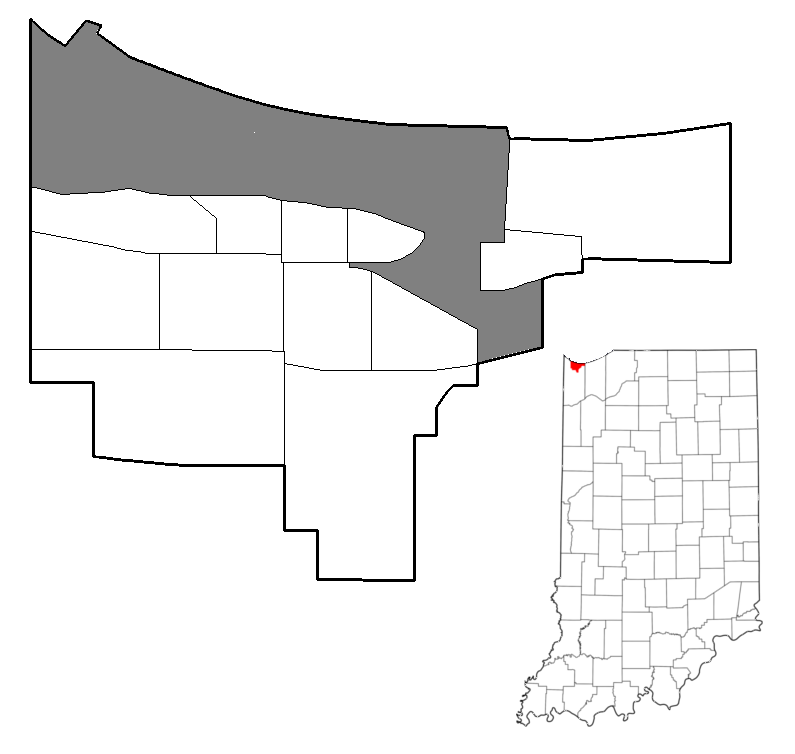
Map of Gary; gray represents the industrial corridor.

==== Downtown ====
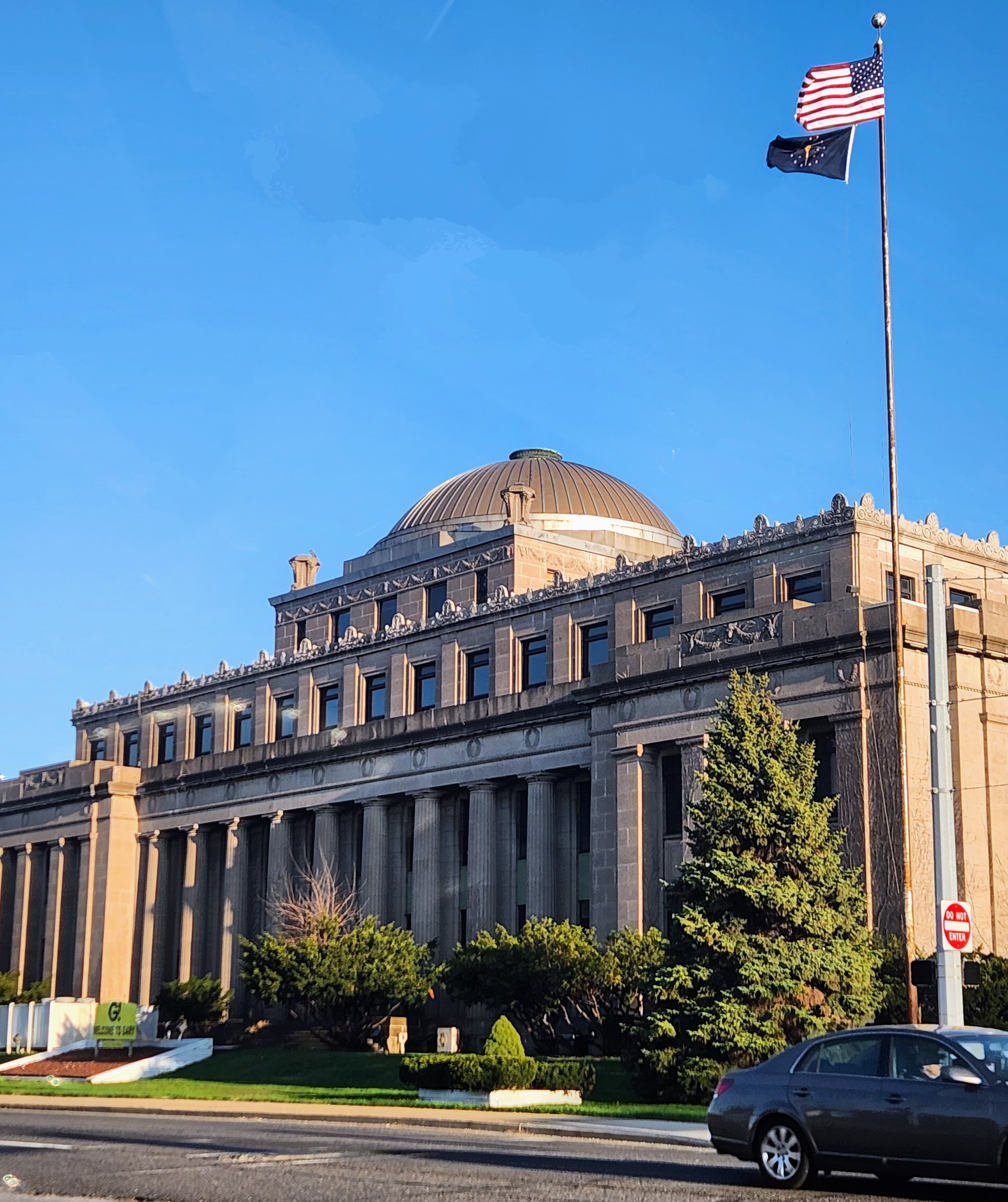
Gary City Hall

Downtown Gary is separated by Broadway into two distinctive communities. Originally, the City of Gary consisted of The East Side, The West Side, The South Side (the area south of the train tracks near 9th Avenue), and Glen Park, located further South along Broadway. The East Side was demarcated by streets named after the States in order of their acceptance into the Union. This area contained mostly wood-frame houses, some of the earliest in the city, and became known in the 20th century for its ethnic populations from Europe and large families.

The single-family houses had repeating house designs that alternated from one street to another, with some streets looking very similar. Among the East Side's most notable buildings were Memorial Auditorium (a large red-brick and stone civic auditorium and the site of numerous events, concerts and graduations), The Palace Theater, Emerson School, St. Luke's Church, H.C. Gordon & Sons, and Goldblatt's Department stores, in addition to the Fair Department Store. All fronted Broadway as the main street that divided Gary.

The West Side of Gary, or West of Broadway, the principal commercial street, had streets named after the presidents of the United States in order of their election. Lytton's, Hudson's ladies store, J.C. Penney, and Radigan Bros Furniture Store developed on the west side of Broadway. Developed later, this side of town was known for its masonry or brick residences, its taller and larger commercial buildings, including the Gary National Bank Building, Hotel Gary (now Genesis Towers), The Knights of Columbus Hotel & Building (now affordable housing fronting 5th Avenue), the Tivoli Theater (demolished), the U.S. Post Office, Main Library, Mercy and Methodist Hospitals and Holy Angels Cathedral and School.

The West Side had a secondary principal street, Fifth Avenue, which was lined with many commercial businesses, restaurants, theaters, tall buildings, and elegant apartment buildings. The West Side was viewed as having wealthier residents. The houses dated from about 1908 to the 1930s. Much of the West Side's housing were for executives of U.S. Steel and other prominent businessmen.

Notable mansions were 413 Tyler Street and 636 Lincoln Street. Many of the houses were on larger lots. By contrast, a working-class area was made up of row houses made of poured concrete which were arranged together and known as "Mill Houses", built to house steel mill workers.

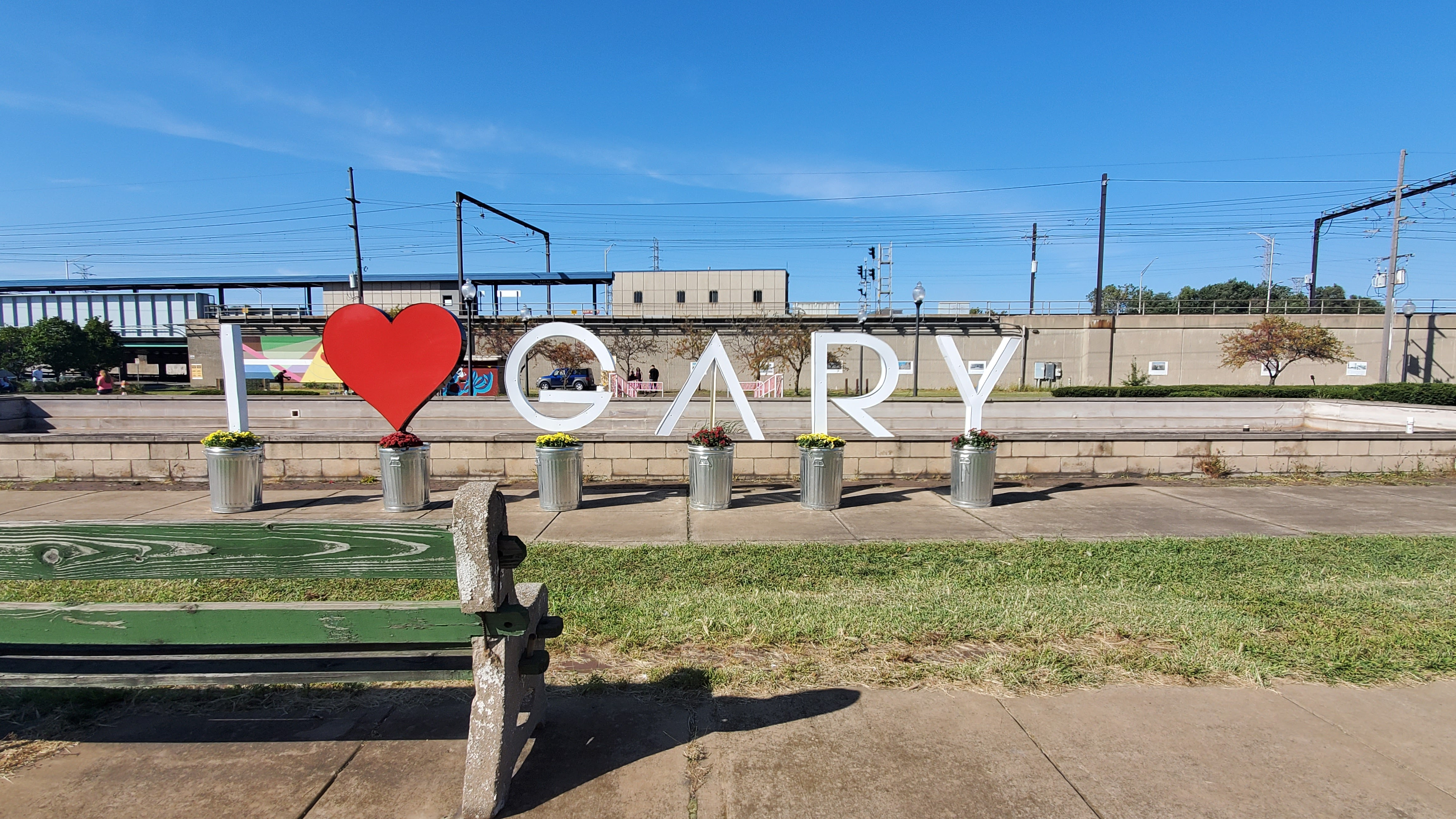
'I Love Gary' – Pop Up Arts Display Gateway Park (2019)

The areas known as Emerson and Downtown West combine to form Downtown Gary. It was developed in the 1920s and houses several pieces of impressive architecture, including the Moe House, designed by Frank Lloyd Wright, and another, the Wynant House (1917), which was destroyed by fire. A significant number of older structures have been demolished in recent years because of the cost of restoration. Restructuring of the steel and other heavy industry in the late 20th century resulted in a loss of jobs, adversely affecting the city.

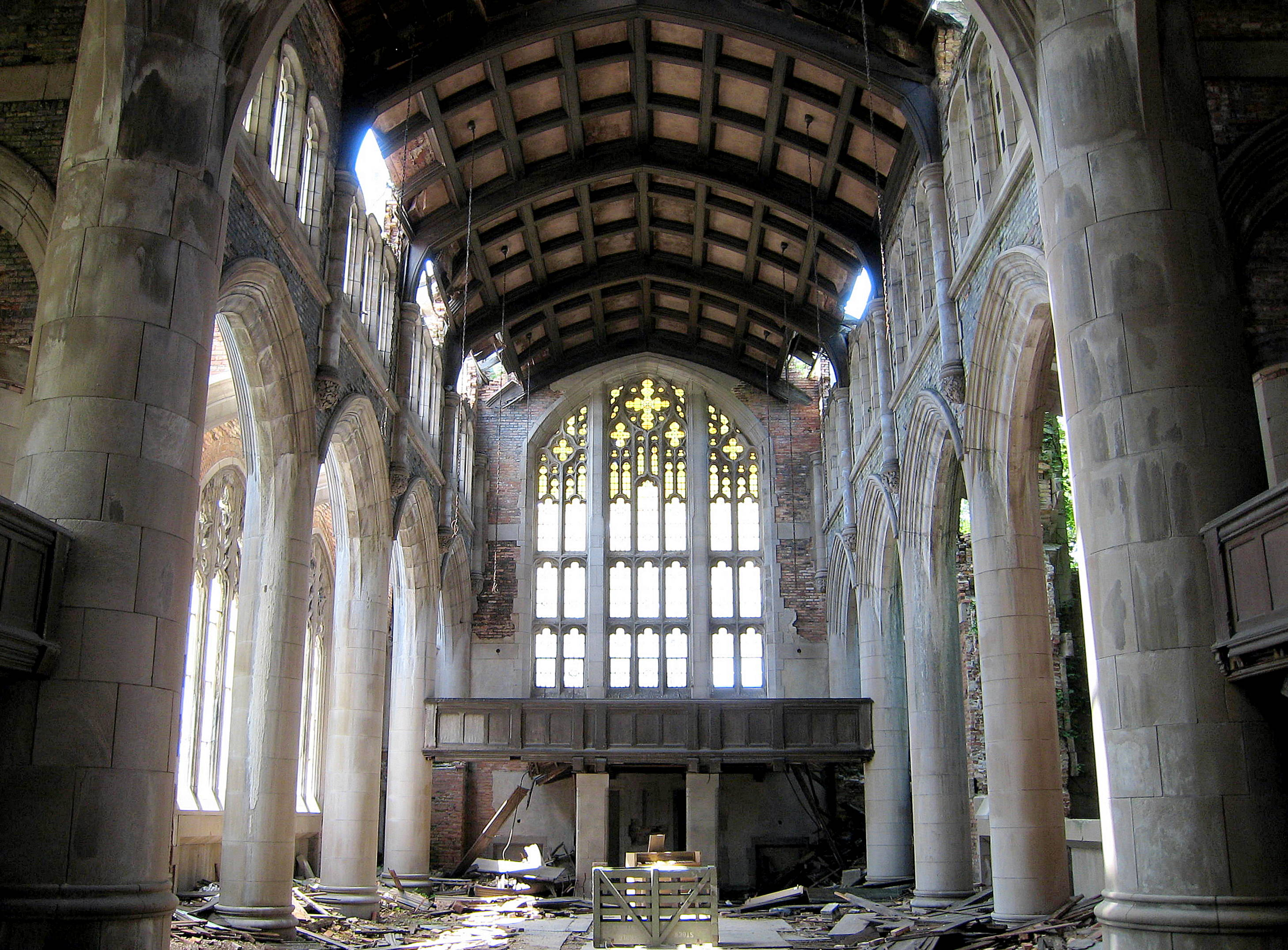
City Methodist Church as it appeared in 2009

Abandoned buildings in the downtown area include historic structures such as Union Station, the Palace Theater, and City Methodist Church. A large area of the downtown neighborhood, including City Methodist, was devastated by a major fire on October 12, 1997. Interstate 90 was constructed between downtown Gary and the United States Steel plant.

==== West ====
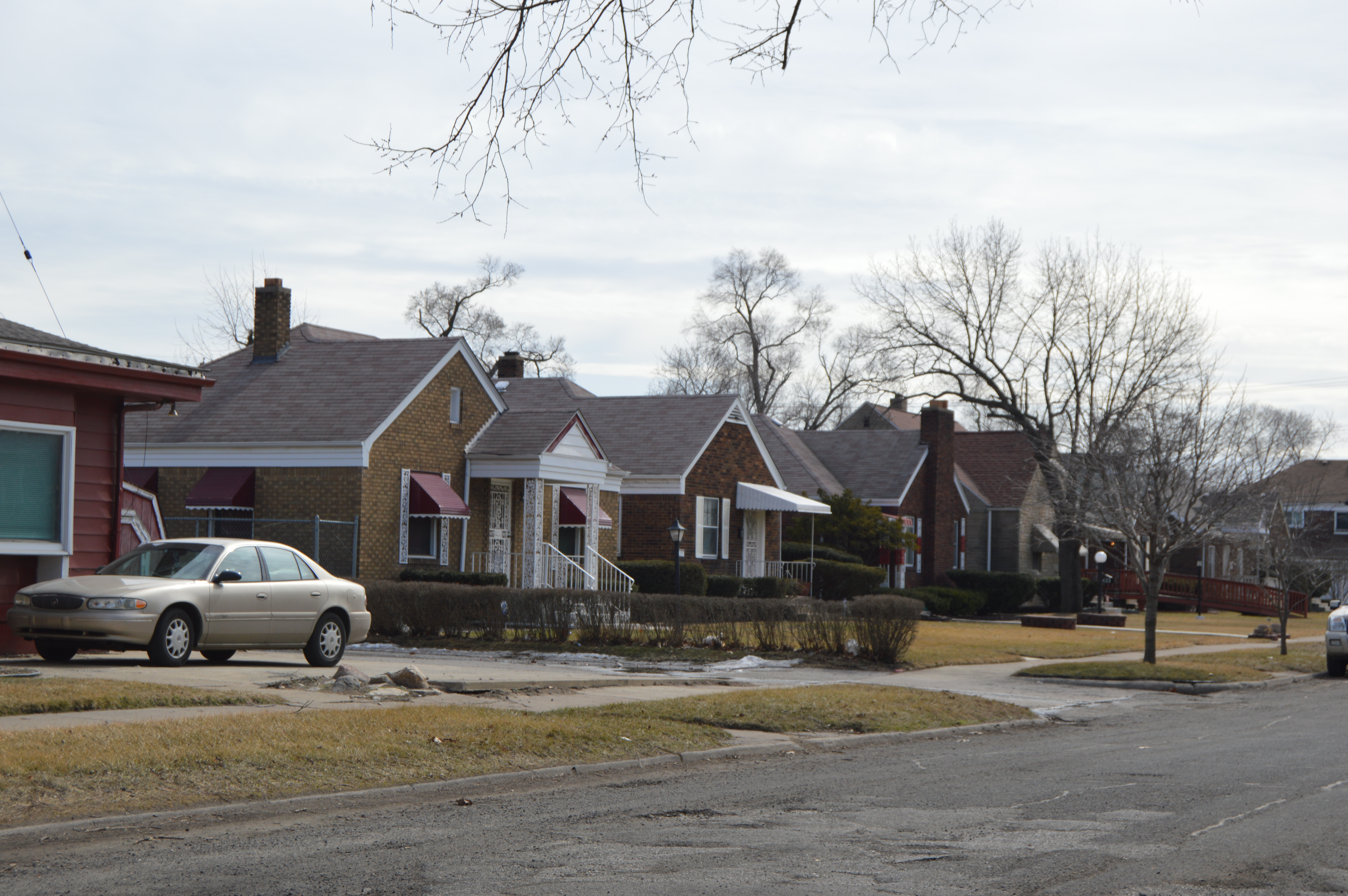
Homes in the Combs Addition Historic District of the Ambridge Mann neighborhood

Ambridge Mann is a neighborhood located on Gary's near west side along 5th Avenue. Ambridge was developed for workers at the nearby steel plant in the 1910s and 1920s. It is named after the American Bridge Works, which was a subsidiary of U.S. Steel. The neighborhood is home to a huge stock of prairie-style and art deco homes. The Gary Masonic Temple was located in the neighborhood, along with the Ambassador apartment building. Located just south of Interstate 90, the neighborhood can be seen while passing Buchanan Street.

Brunswick is located on Gary's far west side. The neighborhood is located just south of Interstate 90 and can also be seen from the expressway. The Brunswick area includes the Tri-City Plaza shopping center on West 5th Avenue (U.S. 20). The area is south of the Gary Chicago International Airport.

Downtown West is located in north-central Gary on the west side of Broadway just south of Interstate 90. The Genesis Convention Center, the Gary Police Department, the Lake Superior Court House, and the Main Branch of the Gary Public Library are located along 5th Avenue. A new 123-unit mixed-income apartment development was built using a HUD HOPE VI grant in 2006.

Gary Metro Center is located just north of 4th Avenue. It is operated by the Gary Public Transportation Corporation and serves as a multi-modal hub. It serves both as the Downtown Gary South Shore train station and an intercity bus stop.

Tolleston is one of Gary's oldest neighborhoods, predating much of the rest of the city. It was platted by George Tolle in 1857 when the railroads were constructed in this area. This area is west of Midtown and south of Ambridge Mann. Tarrytown is a subdivision located in Tolleston between Whitcomb Street and Clark Road.

==== South ====
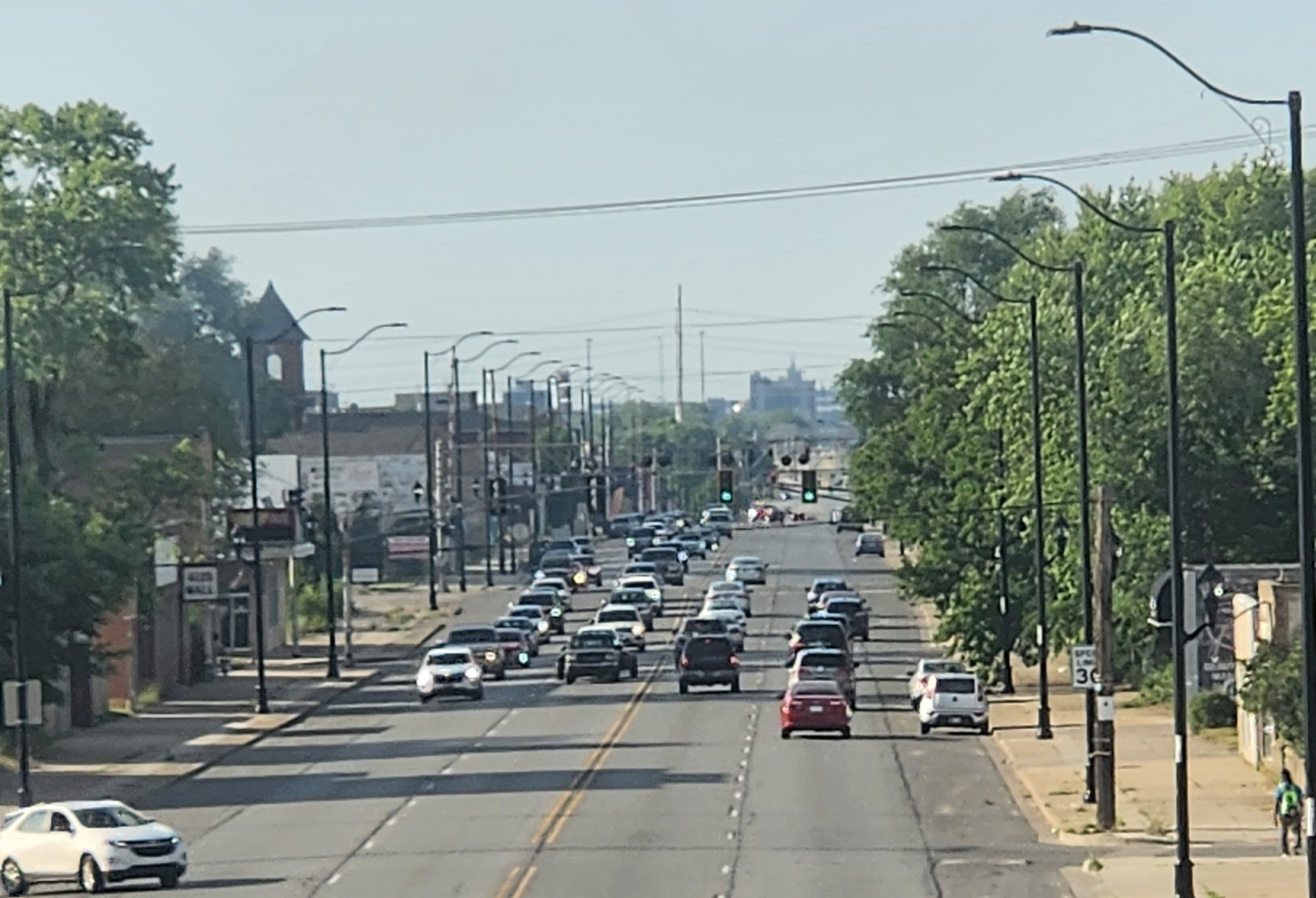
Broadway in the Glen Park neighborhood

Black Oak is located on the far southwest side of Gary, in the vicinity of the Burr Street exit to the Borman Expressway. It was annexed in the 1970s. Prior to that, Black Oak was an unincorporated area informally associated with Hammond, and the area has Hammond telephone numbers. After three referendums, the community voters approved annexation, having been persuaded by Mayor Hatcher that they would benefit more from services provided by the city than from those provided by the county. In the 21st century, it is the only majority-white neighborhood in Gary.

Glen Park is located on Gary's far south side and is made up mostly of mid-twentieth-century houses. Glen Park is divided from the remainder of the city by the Borman Expressway. The northern portion of Glen Park is home to Gary's Gleason Park Golf Course and the campus of Indiana University Northwest. The far western portion of Glen Park is home to the Village Shopping Center. Glen Park includes the 37th Avenue corridor at Broadway.

Midtown is located south of Downtown Gary, along Broadway. In the pre-1960s days of de facto segregation, this developed historically as a "black" neighborhood as African Americans came to Gary from the rural South in the Great Migration to seek jobs in the industrial economy.

==== North and East ====
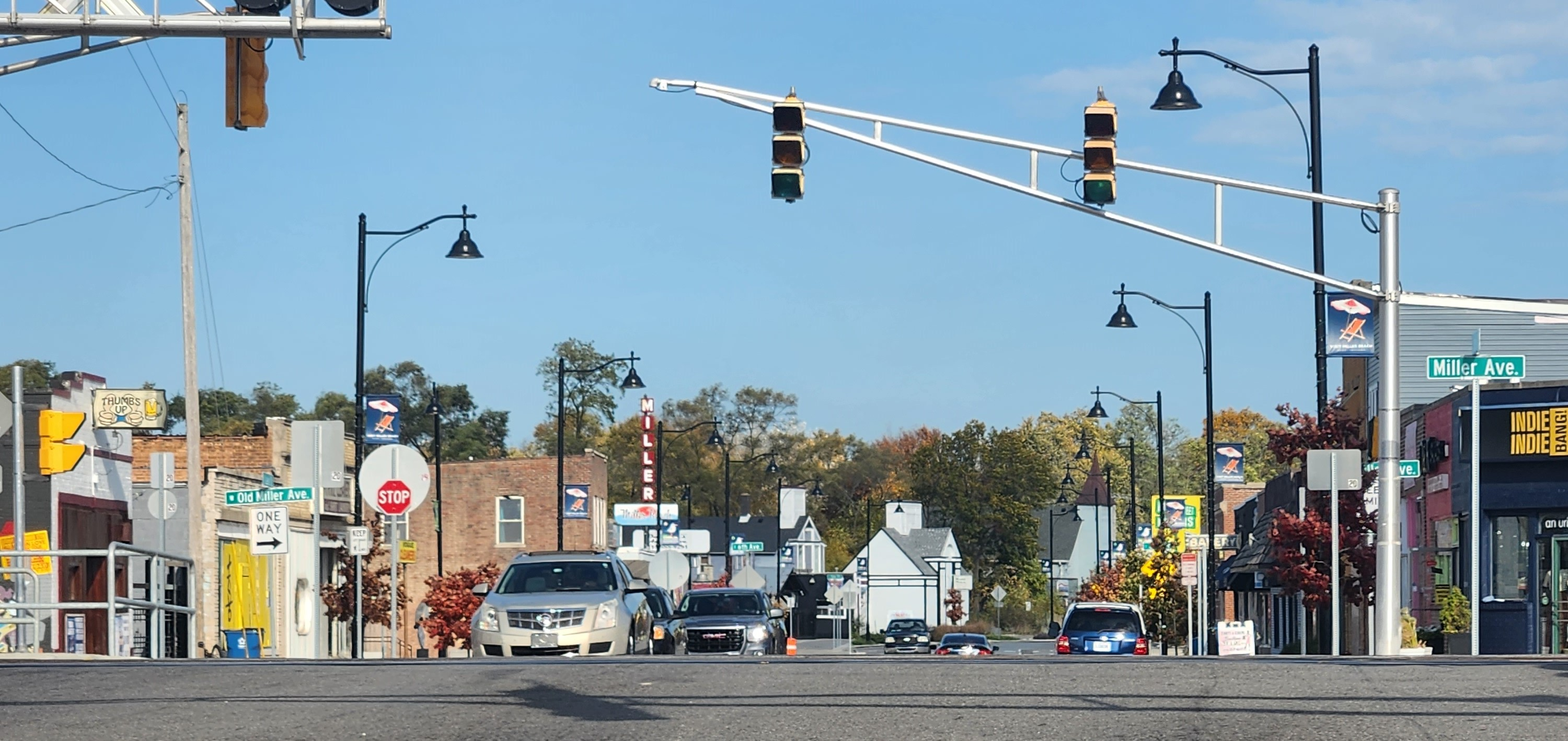
Commercial district in the Miller Beach neighborhood

Aetna is located on Gary's far east side along the Dunes Highway. Aetna predates the city of Gary. This company town was founded in 1881 by the Aetna Powder Works, an explosives company. Their factory closed after the end of World War I.

The Town of Aetna was annexed by Gary in 1928, around the same time that the city annexed the Town of Miller. In the late 1920s and early 1930s, Gary's prosperous industries helped generate residential and other development in Aetna, resulting in an impressive collection of art deco architecture. The rest of the community was built after World War II and the Korean War in the 1950s, in a series of phases. On its south and east, Aetna borders the undeveloped floodplain of the Little Calumet River.

Emerson is located in north-central Gary on the east side of Broadway. Located just south of Interstate 90, Gary City Hall is located in Emerson, along with the Indiana Department of Social Services building and the Calumet Township Trustee's office. A 6,000-seat minor league baseball stadium for the Gary SouthShore RailCats, U.S. Steel Yard, was constructed in 2002, along with contiguous commercial space and minor residential development.

Miller Beach, also known simply as Miller, is on Gary's far northeast side. Settled in the 1850s and incorporated as an independent town in 1907, Miller was annexed by the city of Gary in 1918. Miller developed around the old stagecoach stop and train station known by the 1850s as Miller's Junction or Miller's Station. Miller Beach is racially and economically diverse. It attracts investor interest due to the many year-round and summer homes within walking distance of Marquette Park and Lake Michigan.

Prices for lakefront property are affordable compared to those in Illinois suburban communities. Lake Street provides shopping and dining options for Miller Beach visitors and residents. East Edge, a development of 28 upscale condominium, townhome, and single-family homes, began construction in 2007 at the eastern edge of Miller Beach along County Line Road, one block south of Lake Michigan.

== Demographics ==
Historical population
Census	Pop.	Note	%±
1910	16,802		—
1920	55,378		229.6%
1930	100,666		81.8%
1940	111,719		11.0%
1950	133,911		19.9%
1960	178,320		33.2%
1970	175,415		−1.6%
1980	151,968		−13.4%
1990	116,646		−23.2%
2000	102,746		−11.9%
2010	80,294		−21.9%
2020	69,093		−13.9%
2025 (est.)	67,289		−2.6%
U.S. Decennial Census; 2020 Census

The change in the economy and resulting loss of jobs has caused a drop in population by nearly two thirds since its peak in 1960.

=== Racial and ethnic composition ===
Gary city, Indiana – racial and ethnic composition Note: the US Census treats Hispanic/Latino as an ethnic category. This table excludes Latinos from the racial categories and assigns them to a separate category. Hispanics/Latinos may be of any race.
Race / ethnicity (NH = Non-Hispanic)	Pop 2000	Pop 2010	Pop 2020	% 2000	% 2010	2020
White alone (NH)	10,338	7,151	6,374	10.06%	8.91%	9.23%
Black or African American alone (NH)	85,704	67,363	54,660	83.41%	83.90%	79.11%
Native American or Alaska Native alone (NH)	162	197	112	0.16%	0.25%	0.16%
Asian alone (NH)	123	156	124	0.12%	0.19%	0.18%
Native Hawaiian or Pacific Islander alone (NH)	15	5	11	0.01%	0.01%	0.02%
Other race alone (NH)	124	69	390	0.12%	0.09%	0.56%
Mixed race or multiracial (NH)	1,215	1,225	2,201	1.18%	1.53%	3.19%
Hispanic or Latino (any race)	5,065	4,128	5,221	4.93%	5.14%	7.56%
Total	102,746	80,294	69,093	100.00%	100.00%	100.00%

=== 2020 census ===
In the 2020 census, Gary had a population of 69,093 and 28,610 households, including 16,459 families. The median age was 38.3 years. 26.5% of residents were under the age of 18, including 7.0% under the age of 5, and 17.9% were 65 years of age or older. For every 100 females there were 85.2 males, and for every 100 females age 18 and over there were 79.9 males age 18 and over.

99.9% of residents lived in urban areas, while 0.1% lived in rural areas.

Of the 28,610 households, 29.5% had children under the age of 18 living in them. Of all households, 20.6% were married-couple households, 24.8% were households with a male householder and no spouse or partner present, and 48.0% were households with a female householder and no spouse or partner present. About 37.6% of all households were made up of individuals and 15.1% had someone living alone who was 65 years of age or older.

There were 37,274 housing units, of which 23.2% were vacant. The homeowner vacancy rate was 2.8% and the rental vacancy rate was 9.9%. The population density was 1,388.9 inhabitants per square mile (536.3/km^{2}).

Racial composition as of the 2020 census
Race	Number	Percent
White	7,339	10.6%
Black or African American	55,444	80.2%
American Indian and Alaska Native	269	0.4%
Asian	131	0.2%
Native Hawaiian and Other Pacific Islander	15	0.0%
Some other race	2,286	3.3%
Two or more races	3,609	5.2%

=== 2010 census ===
In the 2010 census, there were 80,294 people, 31,380 households, and 19,691 families residing in the city. The population density was 1,610.2 inhabitants per square mile (621.7/km^{2}). There were 39,531 housing units at an average density of 792.7 per square mile (306.1/km^{2}). The racial makeup of the city was 84.8% African American, 10.7% White, 0.3% Native American, 0.2% Asian, 1.8% from other races, and 2.1% from two or more races. Hispanic or Latino people of any race were 5.1% of the population. Non-Hispanic Whites were 8.9% of the population in 2010, down from 39.1% in 1970.

There were 31,380 households, of which 33.5% had children under the age of 18 living with them, 25.2% were married couples living together, 30.9% had a female householder with no husband present, 6.7% had a male householder with no wife present, and 37.2% were non-families. 32.8% of all households were made up of individuals, and 11.9% had someone living alone who was 65 years of age or older. The average household size was 2.54 and the average family size was 3.23.

The median age in the city was 36.7 years. 28.1% of residents were under the age of 18; 8.6% were between the ages of 18 and 24; 21.8% were from 25 to 44; 27.1% were from 45 to 64; and 14.5% were 65 years of age or older. The gender makeup of the city was 46.0% male and 54.0% female.

=== 2000 census ===
In the 2000 census, there were 102,746 people, 38,244 households, and 25,623 families residing in the city. The population density was 2,045.5 inhabitants per square mile (789.8/km^{2}). There were 43,630 housing units at an average density of 868.6 per square mile (335.4/km^{2}). The racial makeup of the city was 84.03% African American, 11.92% White, 0.21% Native American, 0.14% Asian, 0.02% Pacific Islander, 1.97% from other races, and 1.71% from two or more races. Hispanic or Latino people of any race were 4.93% of the population.

There were 38,244 households, out of which 31.2% had children under the age of 18 living with them, 30.2% were married couples living together, 30.9% had a female householder with no husband present, and 33.0% were non-families. 28.9% of all households were made up of individuals, and 9.4% had someone living alone who was 65 years of age or older. The average household size was 2.66 and the average family size was 3.28.

29.9% of the population were under the age of 18, 10.1% from 18 to 24, 25.1% from 25 to 44, 22.2% from 45 to 64, and 12.8% who were 65 years of age or older. The median age was 34 years. For every 100 females, there were 84.6 males. For every 100 females age 18 and over, there were 78.0 males.

The median income for a household in the city was $27,195, and the median income for a family was $32,205. Males had a median income of $34,992 versus $24,432 for females. The per capita income for the city was $14,383. About 22.2% of families and 25.8% of the population were below the poverty line, including 37.9% of those under age 18 and 14.1% of those age 65 or over.

== Arts and culture ==
=== Arts and film ===
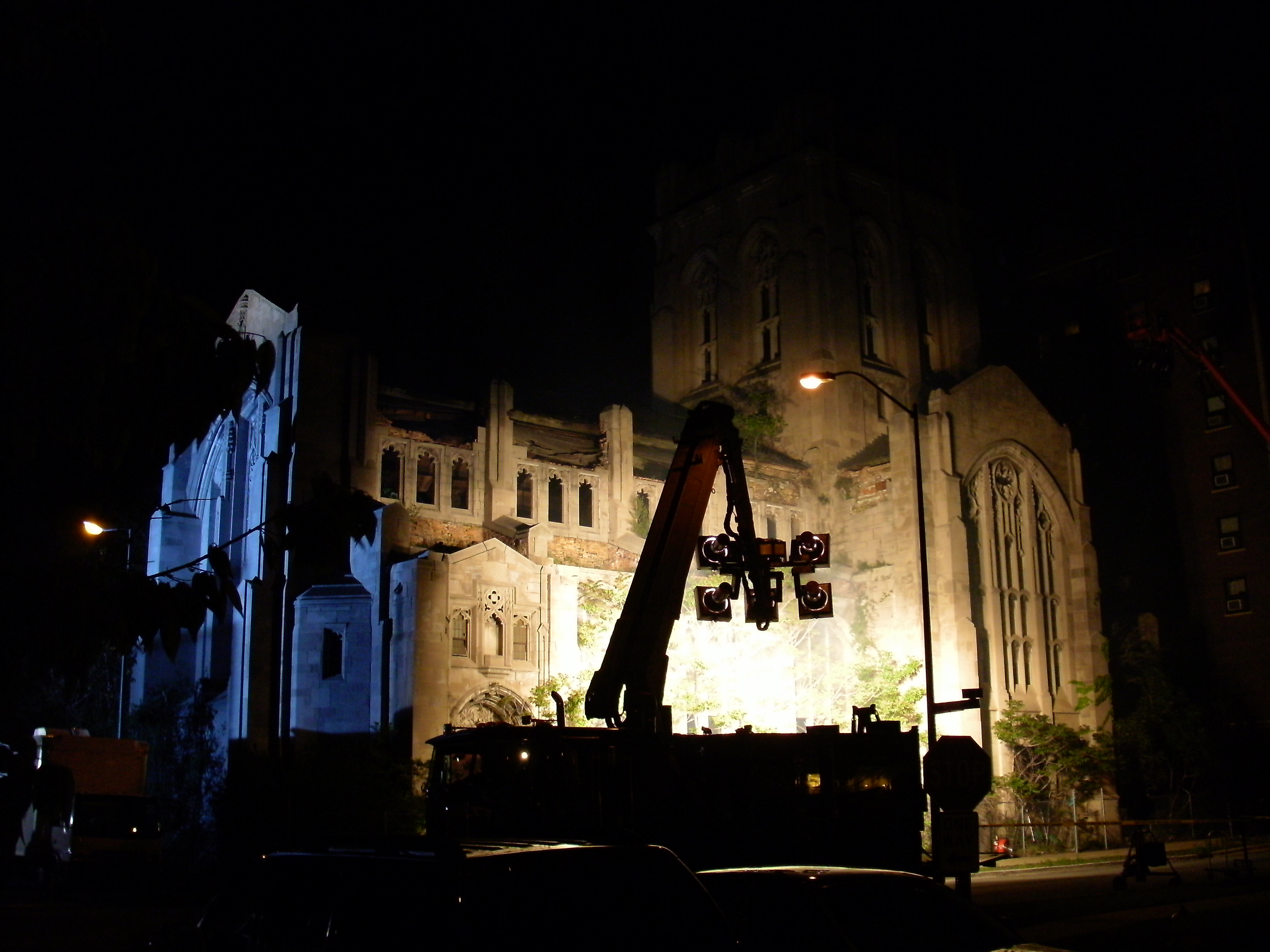
A Nightmare on Elm Street being filmed in Gary

Meredith Willson's 1957 Broadway musical The Music Man featured the song "Gary, Indiana", in which lead character (and con man) Professor Harold Hill wistfully recalls his purported hometown, which then was prosperous. Hill claims to be an alumnus of "Gary Conservatory of Music, Class of '05", but this is later revealed to be another of his lies. The City of Gary was not founded until 1906. Willson's musical, set in 1912, was adapted both as a film of the same name released in 1962, and as a television film, produced in 2003.

The 1996 urban film Original Gangstas was filmed in the city. It starred Gary native Fred Williamson, Pam Grier, Jim Brown, Richard Roundtree, and Isabel Sanford, among others. Since the early 2000s, Gary has been the setting for numerous films made by Hollywood filmmakers. In 2009, scenes for the remake of A Nightmare on Elm Street were filmed in Gary. Scenes from Transformers: Dark of the Moon wrapped up filming on August 16, 2010.

The History Channel documentary Life After People was filmed in Gary, exploring areas that have deteriorated or been abandoned because of the loss of jobs and residents.

In John Mellencamp's 1985 song "Minutes to Memories", an old man on a bus recalls his humble life and tells the young man beside him, "I worked my whole life in the steel mills of Gary."

In the song "YA YA", on Beyoncé's 2024 Grammy–winning Album of the Year, Cowboy Carter, Gary is mentioned as the intermediary stop on a three-city tour along the Chitlin' Circuit.

The 2024 Netflix series The Deliverance, set in Gary, is based on the Ammons haunting case which also occurred in Gary.

=== Historic places on the National Register ===
The following single properties and national historic districts are listed on the National Register of Historic Places:

- American Sheet and Tin Mill Apartment Building
- Louis J. Bailey Branch Library-Gary International Institute
- Combs Addition Historic District
- Ralph Waldo Emerson School
- Eskilson Historic District
- Gary Bathing Beach Aquatorium
- Gary City Center Historic District
- Gary Land Company Building
- Gary Public Schools Memorial Auditorium
- Jackson-Monroe Terraces Historic District
- Jefferson Street Historic District
- Knights of Columbus Building
- Lincoln Street Historic District
- Horace Mann Historic District
- Miller Town Hall
- Monroe Terrace Historic District
- Morningside Historic District
- Polk Street Concrete Cottage Historic District
- Polk Street Terraces Historic District
- Theodore Roosevelt High School
- Barney Sablotney House
- St. Augustine's Episcopal Church
- Van Buren Terrace Historic District
- West Fifth Avenue Apartments Historic District
- St. John's Evangelical Lutheran Church and School

=== Public libraries ===
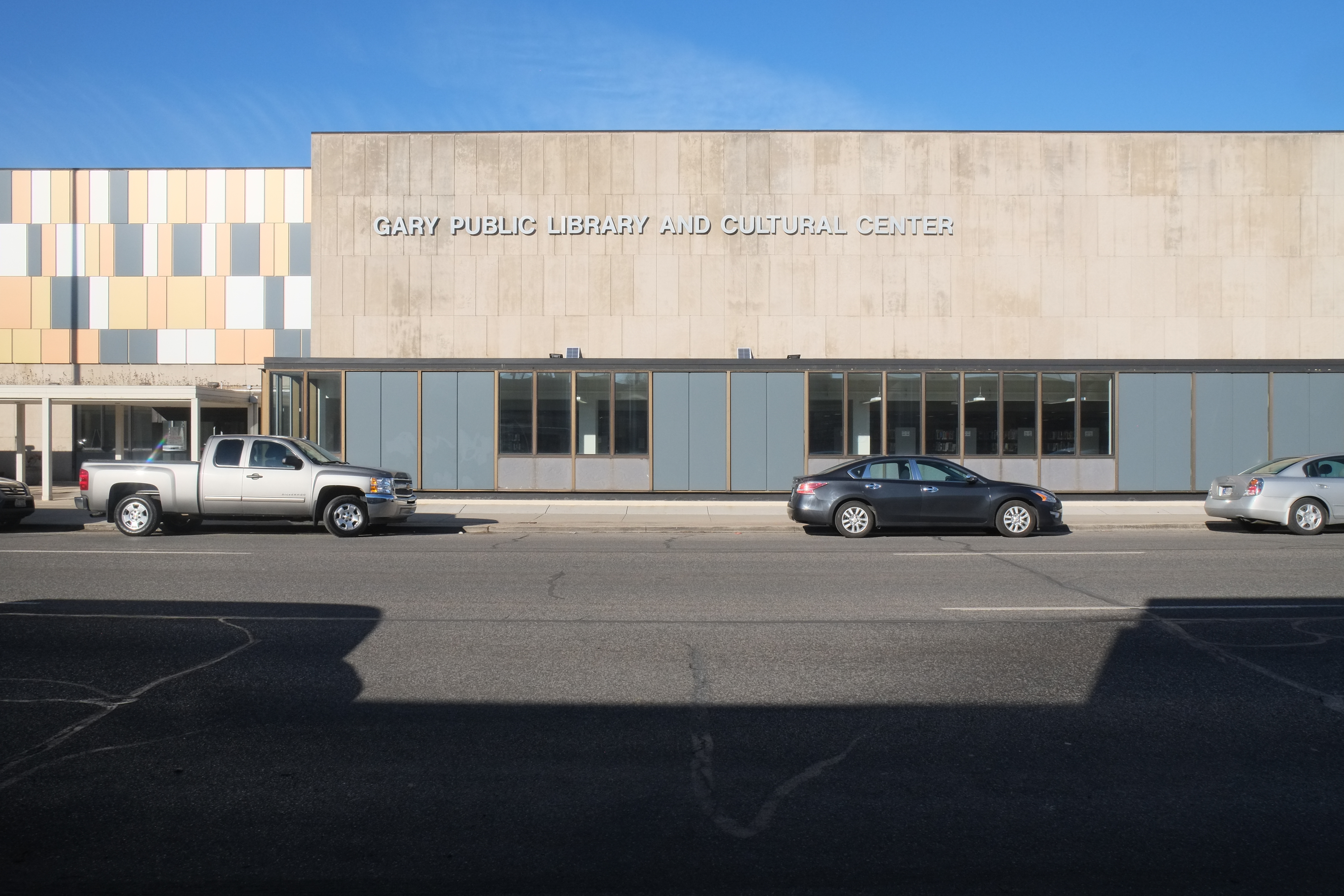
Gary Public Library and Cultural Center in 2019

The Gary Public Library System consists of the main library at 220 West 5th Avenue and several branches: Brunswick Branch, W. E. B. DuBois Branch, J. F. Kennedy Branch, Tolleston Branch, and Woodson Branch. In March 2011, the Gary Library Board voted to close the main library on 5th Avenue and the Tolleston branch in what officials said was their best economic option. The main library closed at the end of 2011. The building now houses a museum.

Lake County Public Library operates the Black Oak Branch at 5921 West 25th Avenue in the Gary city limits. In addition, Indiana University Northwest operates the John W. Anderson Library on its campus.

== Sports ==
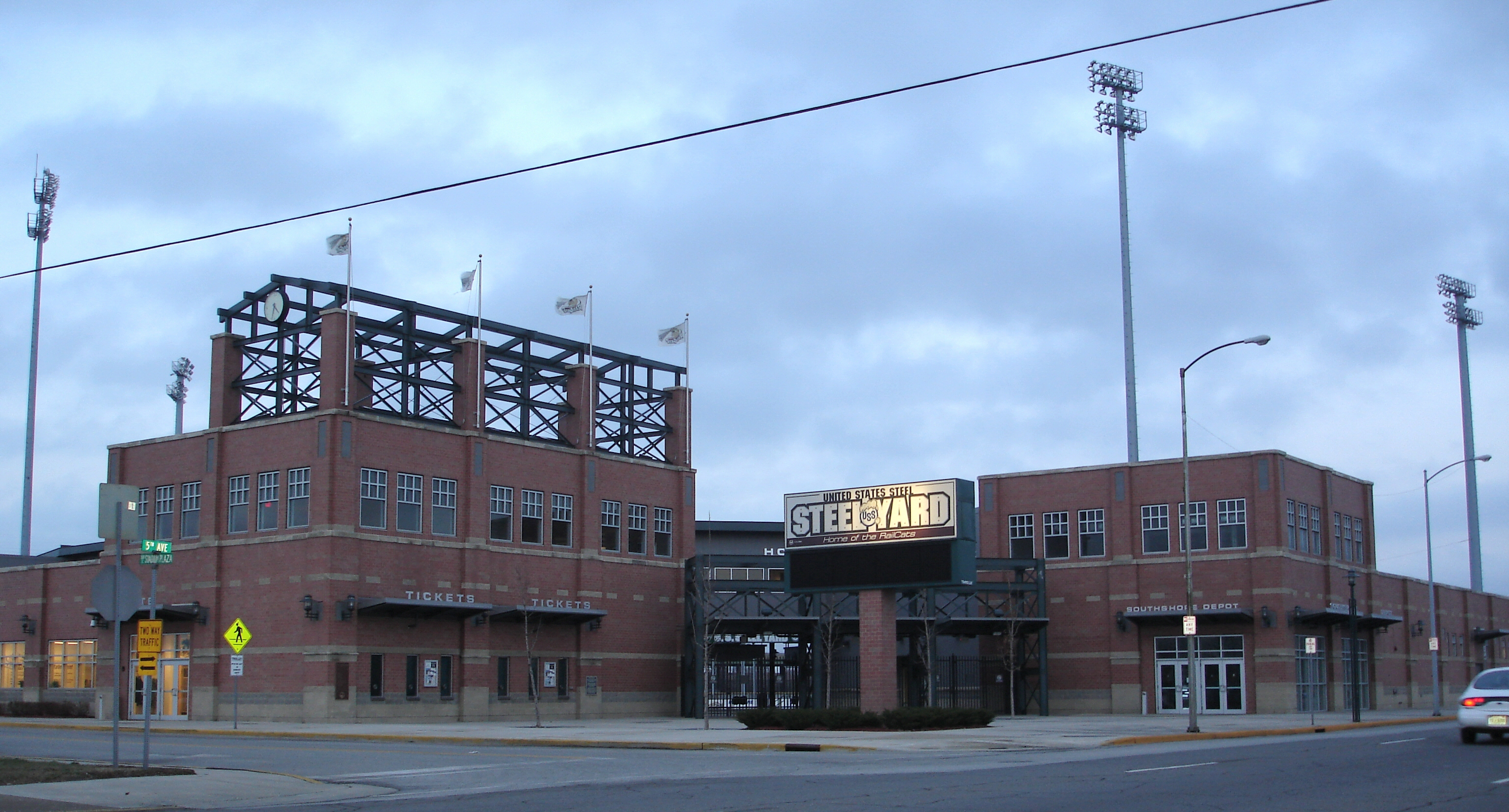
U.S. Steel Yard, home of the Gary SouthShore RailCats

The following sports franchises are based in Gary:

- The Gary SouthShore RailCats are an American Association, professional baseball team. The team plays in Gary's U.S. Steel Yard baseball stadium. The RailCats played in the Northern League from 2002 until 2010. They now play in the modern American Association. The team won league championships in 2005, 2007, and 2013.
- Gary has hosted two professional basketball franchises. The Gary Splash played in the International Basketball League from 2010 to 2013, at the Genesis Convention Center. Previously, the Gary Steelheads played in the Genesis Convention Center as part of the IBL (1999–2001), CBA, USBL, and IBL.

== Education ==
Three school districts serve the city, and multiple charter schools are located within the city.

=== Public schools ===
Most areas of Gary are within the Gary Community School Corporation. Other areas within the city are administered by Lake Ridge Schools Corporation, which is the school system for the Black Oak neighborhood and unincorporated Calumet Township. Due to annexation law, Black Oak residents retained their original school system and were not required to attend Gary public schools. In 1927, it was mandated that Black students attend a separate high school. A few parts of Gary to the southeast are in the River Forest Community School Corporation.

=== Charter schools ===
Charter schools in Indiana, including those in Gary, are granted charters by one of a small number of chartering institutions. Indiana charter schools are generally managed in cooperation between the chartering institution, a local board of parents and community members, salaried school administrators, and a management company. Charter schools in Gary as of 2011 include Thea Bowman Leadership Academy, Charter School of the Dunes, Gary Lighthouse Charter School (formerly Blessed Sacrament Parish and Grade School), and 21st Century Charter.

=== Higher education ===
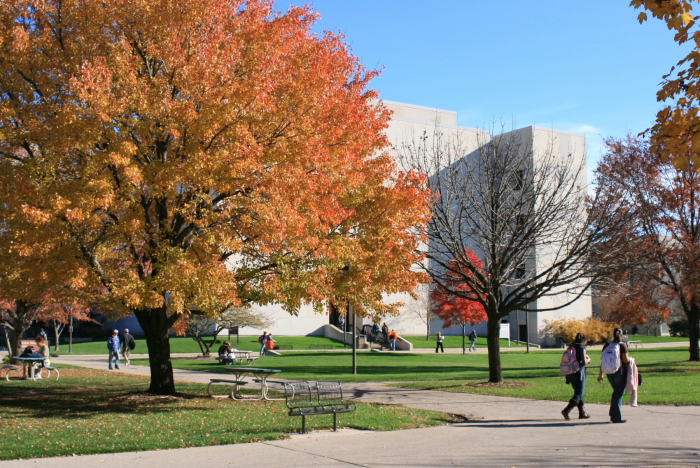
Indiana University Northwest

Gary is home to two regional state college campuses:

- Indiana University Northwest
- Ivy Tech Community College Northwest

== Media ==
=== Newspapers ===
Gary is served by two major newspapers based outside the city, and by a Gary-based, largely African-American interest paper. These papers provide regional topics, and cover events in Gary.

- The Post-Tribune, originally the Gary Post-Tribune, is now based in the nearby town of Merrillville.
- The Times, previously known as the Hammond Times. Offices and facilities for The Times are in nearby Munster.
- The Gary Crusader, based in Gary and largely focused on African-American interests and readership
- The INFO Newspaper, based in Gary and largely focused on African-American interests and readership
- The Chicago Tribune and the Chicago Sun-Times, based in Chicago, are also distributed in Gary.

=== Television and radio ===
Gary is served by five local broadcasters plus government access and numerous Chicago area radio and TV stations, and by other nearby stations in Illinois and Indiana.

- WPWR-TV (Channel 50) is the Chicago MyNetworkTV affiliate but is licensed to Gary. Studios and transmitters are co-located with WFLD's in Chicago, and are also owned by Fox Television Stations.
- WYIN (Channel 56) is a PBS affiliate licensed to Gary. Their studios are in Merrillville.
- WGVE (FM 88.7) is owned by the Gary Community School Corporation, and is used primarily as a teaching facility. Programming is maintained by students in the broadcast program at the Gary Career Center. WGVE also carries limited NPR programming.
- WLTH (AM 1370) primarily carries talk programming, as well as other local programs.
- WWCA (AM 1270) is a Relevant Radio owned-and-operated radio station, carrying programming from the Catholic-oriented Relevant Radio network.

== Infrastructure ==
=== Medical facilities ===
- Gary Community Health Center
- Methodist Hospital

=== Gary Police Department ===
Gary is served by the Gary Police Department and the Lake County Sheriff.

According to the ODMP, since 1912 to the present day, 16 officers and 1 K9 of the Gary Police Department have been killed in the line of duty.

=== Fire department ===
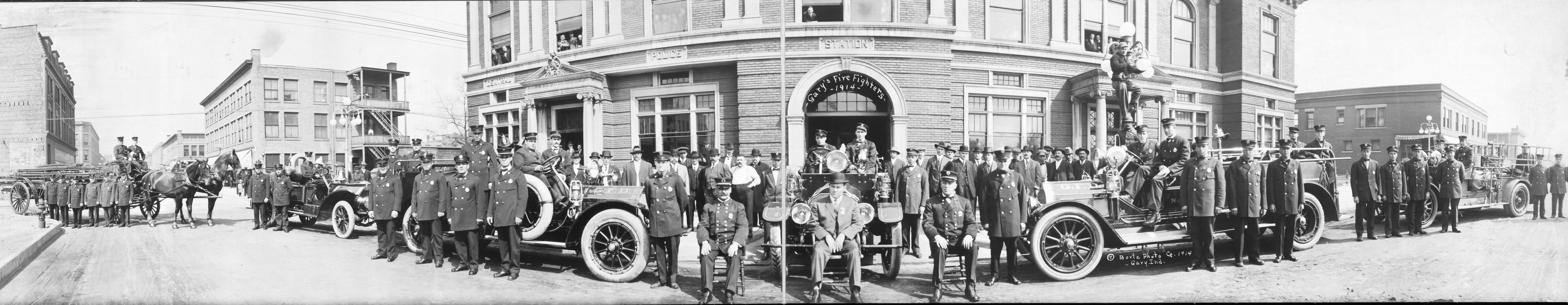
The Gary Fire Department in 1914

The Gary Fire Department (GFD) provides fire protection and emergency medical services to the city of Gary.

=== Transportation ===
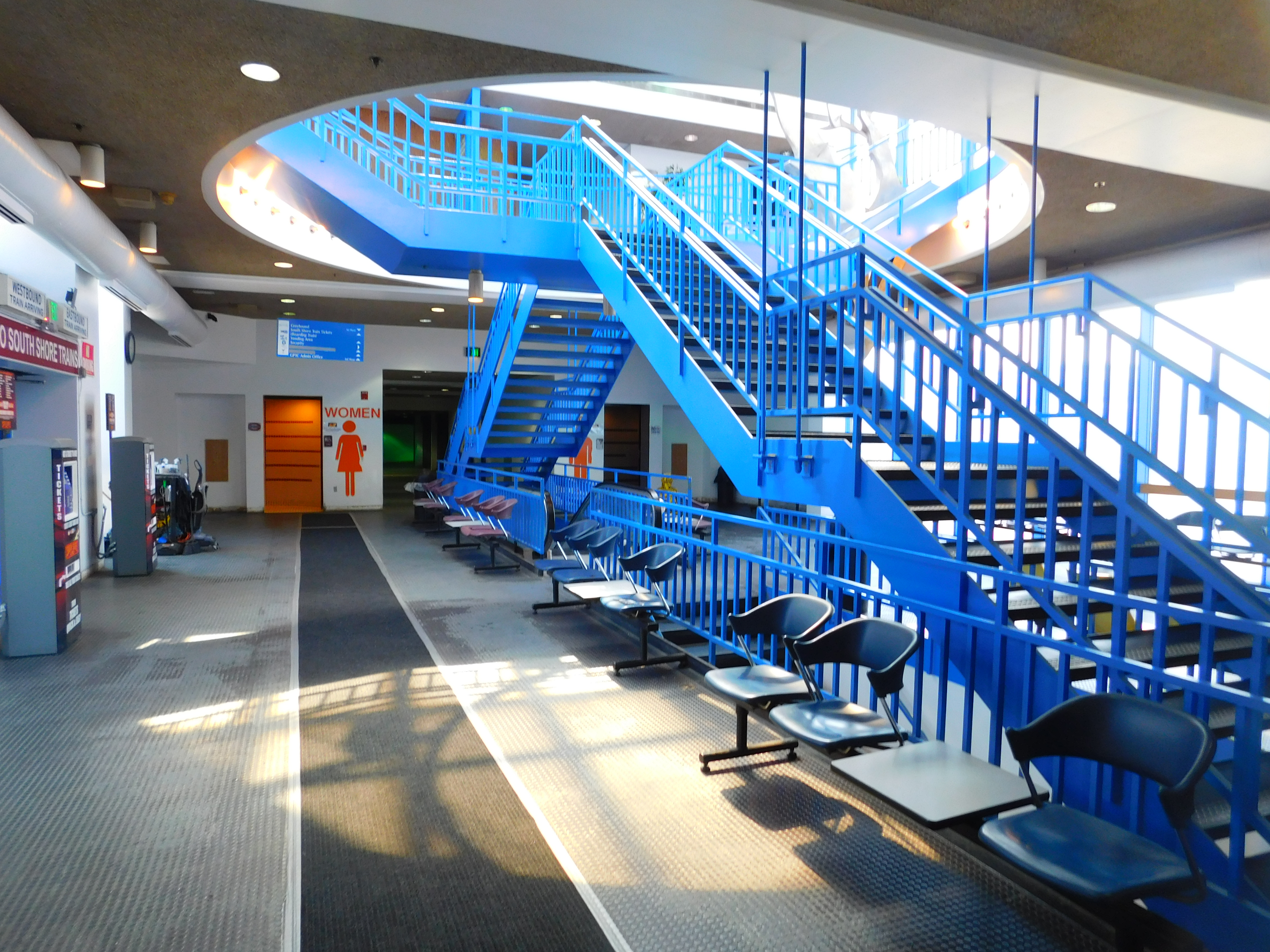
Gary Metro Center is the city's intermodal public transit center.

- Gary Public Transportation Corporation (GPTC) is a public transit system that offers service to numerous stops throughout the city and neighboring suburbs. GPTC also has express service, such as the Broadway Metro Express to locations outside the city, including connections to Chicago transit. Front-door pickup is available for disabled citizens at no extra cost.
- Gary/Chicago International Airport is operating as the "third airport" for the Chicago area. With a runway that was inaugurated in 2015, it previously underwent a federally funded expansion, and the administration has been courting airlines aggressively. The National Guard has based its Chicago area air operation there as well.
- Interstate 90 (I-90, Indiana Toll Road), I-80, I-94, and I-65 run through Gary, as well as U.S. Highway 6 (US 6), US 12 and US 20, and State Road 912 (SR 912, Cline Avenue). A former stretch of SR 312 has been decommissioned.
- The Northern Indiana Commuter Transportation District (NICTD) operates the South Shore Line, a commuter rail system between Chicago and South Bend. It is one of the last original operating interurban railway systems in the US.

== Notable people ==
=== The Jacksons ===
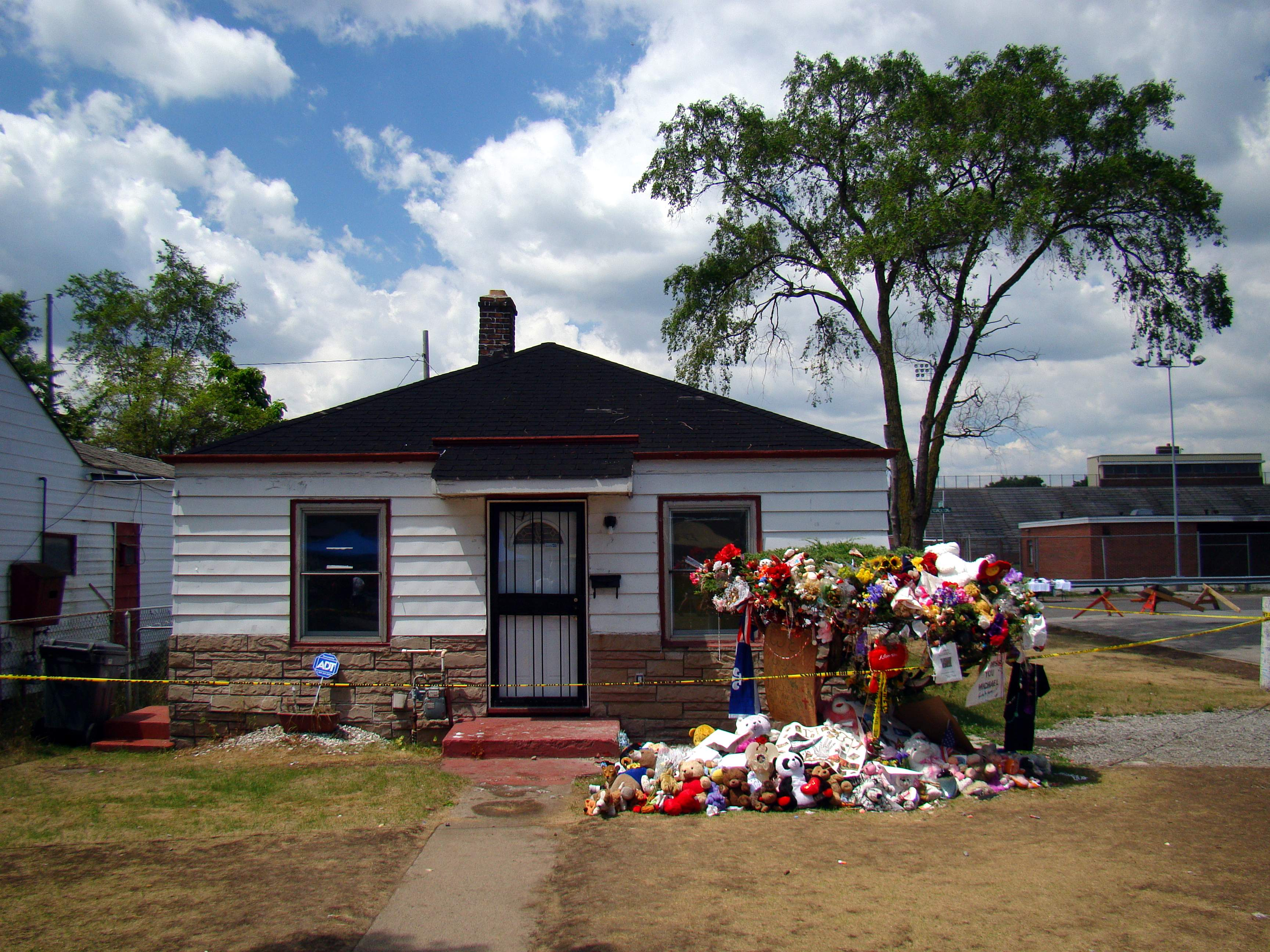
Michael Jackson's childhood home in Gary shortly after his death in 2009

Gary is the hometown of the Jackson family, a family of musicians who influenced the sound of modern popular music. In 1950, Joe and Katherine Jackson moved from East Chicago, Indiana, into their two-bedroom house at 2300 Jackson Street. They had married on November 5, 1949. Their entertainer children later recorded a song entitled "2300 Jackson Street" (1989). The Jackson children include:

- Rebbie Jackson
- Jackie Jackson
- Tito Jackson
- Jermaine Jackson
- La Toya Jackson
- Marlon Jackson
- Michael Jackson
- Randy Jackson
- Janet Jackson

=== Other notable people ===
- Charles Adkins, Olympic boxer
- Forddy Anderson, NCAA basketball coach
- Monroe Anderson, (born 1947), journalist, author, was Chicago's press secretary for mayor Eugene Sawyer
- Dan Barreiro, sports radio talk show host
- Adam Benjamin Jr. was an American politician of Armenian descent and a United States Representative from Indiana's 1st congressional district
- Bob Benoit, horse racing executive
- Albert M. Bielawski, early 20th century Michigan politician
- Frank Borman, crew member of Apollo 8
- Lyman Bostock, Major League Baseball (MLB) player
- John Brim, bluesman
- Donna Britt, journalist and author
- Eugene Britt, serial killer
- Avery Brooks, actor, director
- Vic Bubas, NCAA basketball coach
- John A. Bushemi, WWII photographer killed in action
- Vivian Carter, music producer
- John Chickerneo, National Football League (NFL) player
- Rudolph M. Clay, Mayor of Gary 2006–12
- William Coyne, DuPont Company executive
- Branden Dawson (born 1993), basketball player
- Tony DeSantis (1914–2007), founder of Drury Lane theaters
- Polly Draper (born 1955), actress, Thirtysomething
- Dianne Durham (1967–2021), first Black national gymnastics champion
- Richard Esteras, actor The Bear
- Clarissa Pinkola Estés, writer and psychoanalyst
- Dana Evans, WNBA guard for the Las Vegas Aces
- Karen Fairchild, country music singer
- Bianca Ferguson (born 1955), actress, General Hospital
- Harry Flournoy (1943–2016), basketball player
- Tellis Frank (born 1965), basketball player
- Karen Freeman-Wilson (born 1960), Mayor of Gary 2012–19, former Indiana Attorney General
- Maurice Friedman (1903–1991), reproductive-physiology researcher
- Winston Garland (born 1964), basketball player
- Darius Garland (born 2000), basketball player
- Joe Gates (1954–2010), baseball player
- Freddie Gibbs (born 1982), rapper
- Eugene German (born 1997), basketball player in the Israeli Basketball Premier League
- A. J. Hammons (born 1992), basketball player
- Tom Harmon (1919–1990), 1940 Heisman Trophy winner for Michigan, sportscaster, father of actor Mark Harmon
- Richard G. Hatcher (1933–2019), Mayor of Gary 1968–87
- LaTroy Hawkins (born 1972), MLB pitcher for 21 years
- Chuck Higgins, saxophonist, best known for the song "Pachuko Hop"
- Eric Hillman (born 1966), MLB and Japan pitcher
- Gerald Irons (born 1947), NFL linebacker for Oakland Raiders and Cleveland Browns 1970–1979
- Johnny Jackson (1955–2006), drummer for Jackson 5; murdered in Gary in 2006
- Tim Jankovich, basketball head coach, SMU
- Elijah Johnson (born 1990), basketball player in the Israeli Basketball Premier League
- Jason Johnson (born 1965), NFL player
- Tank Johnson (born 1981), NFL player
- Alex Karras (1935–2012), winner of Outland Trophy, member of College Football Hall of Fame and Pro Football Hall of Fame, NFL player and actor (Blazing Saddles, Webster)
- Lou Karras (1927–2018), NFL player 1950–1952
- Ted Karras Jr. (born 1964), football player and coach
- Ted Karras Sr. (1934–2016), NFL player 1958–1966
- Robert Kearns (1927–2005), inventor of intermittent windshield wiper systems, subject of Flash of Genius
- Big Daddy Kinsey (1927–2002), blues singer, guitarist, harmonica player and bandleader of The Kinsey Report with his sons
- Ron Kittle (born 1958), Chicago White Sox outfielder and 1983 American League Rookie of the Year
- Milo Komenich (1920–1977), basketball player for 1943 national champion Wyoming
- Bob Kuechenberg (1947–2019), NFL lineman, two-time Super Bowl champion with Miami Dolphins
- Barney Liddell (1921–2003), trombonist in the Lawrence Welk Orchestra, 1948–1982
- Kevin Magee (1959–2003), basketball player
- R. Ellen Magenis (1925–2014), pediatrician, medical geneticist and cytogeneticist
- Karl Malden (1912–2009), Academy Award–winning actor; born in Chicago, raised in Gary
- William Marshall (1924–2003), stage and film actor
- Milt May (born 1950), professional baseball player
- Kym Mazelle (born 1960), singer
- Willie McCarter (born 1946–2023), NBA player, Los Angeles Lakers
- Lloyd McClendon (born 1959), professional baseball player, manager of Pittsburgh Pirates, Seattle Mariners
- Matt McConnell (born 1963), television broadcaster for the Utah Mammoth, National Hockey League
- James McCracken, opera singer
- Robert A. McDonald (born 1953), CEO of Procter & Gamble, Secretary of Veterans Affairs under Barack Obama
- Karen McDougal, Playboy model who was Playmate of the Month in December 1997 and Playmate of the Year in 1998.
- Ralph McQuarrie (1929–2012), conceptual designer and illustrator for Star Wars
- Eddie Melton, Indiana state senator, Mayor of Gary (2024–present)
- Larry Moffett (1954–2011), basketball player
- Brandon Moore (born 1980), NFL player
- Gary Paul Nabhan (born 1952), agricultural ecologist, ethnobotanist
- Sista Monica Parker (1956–2014), electric blues, gospel and soul singer, songwriter, producer
- Jerilynn Patton, known as Jlin, electronic musician
- Jon Petrovich (1947–2011), television executive, CNN
- Dan Plesac (born 1962), MLB pitcher with 18-year career, MLB Network analyst
- Jesse Powell (1971–2022), recording artist
- Elizabeth Brown Pryor (1951–2015), author and diplomat
- Jimmy Reed (1925–1976), musician, Blues Hall of Fame
- Glenn Robinson (born 1973), NBA player and league's No. 1 draft pick, father of Glenn Robinson III
- Glenn Robinson III (born 1994), NBA player
- Paul Samuelson (1915–2009), economist, recipient of John Bates Clark Medal (1947) and Nobel Prize (1970)
- Sharmell (born 1970), WWE wrestler and valet
- Jerry Shay (born 1944), NFL player 1966–1971
- Jana Naomi Smith, filmmaker and writer, 2024 Tribeca Festival award winner
- Helene Stanley (1929–1990), film actress
- Rosie Stephenson-Goodknight (born 1953), Wikipedia editor known for addressing gender bias on Wikipedia and 2016 co-Wikimedian of the Year
- Joseph Stiglitz (born 1943), economist, recipient of John Bates Clark Medal (1979) and Nobel Prize (2001)
- Hank Stram (1923–2005), NFL head coach 1960–1977, member of Pro Football Hall of Fame
- Jeanne Stunyo (1936–2025), diver, Olympic silver medalist
- Robert Summers (1922–2012), economist, American Economic Association Distinguished Fellow
- George Taliaferro (1927–2018), First Black NFL Player and quarterback in College Football Hall of Fame
- Crystal Taliefero (born 1963), singer
- Ernest Lee Thomas (born 1949), actor (What's Happening!!)
- Todd Wagner (born 1960), entrepreneur
- Deniece Williams (born 1950), Grammy Award-winning R&B artist
- Fred Williamson (born 1938), NFL player, linebacker for Kansas City Chiefs in Super Bowl I, three-time AFL All-Star, actor, director, producer
- Tony Zale (1913–1997), twice middleweight champion, member of International Boxing Hall of Fame

== Sister cities ==
- Fuxin, Liaoning, China
- Lagos, Nigeria

== See also ==
- Northwest Indiana
- Neighborhoods in Gary, Indiana
- Magnitogorsk, a city in Russia modeled after Gary
- King assassination riots
- 1968 Chicago riots
- List of U.S. communities with African-American majority populations in 2020
