= Jefferson Street Historic District (Gary, Indiana) =

Historic district in Indiana, United States

- U.S. National Register of Historic Places
- U.S. Historic district
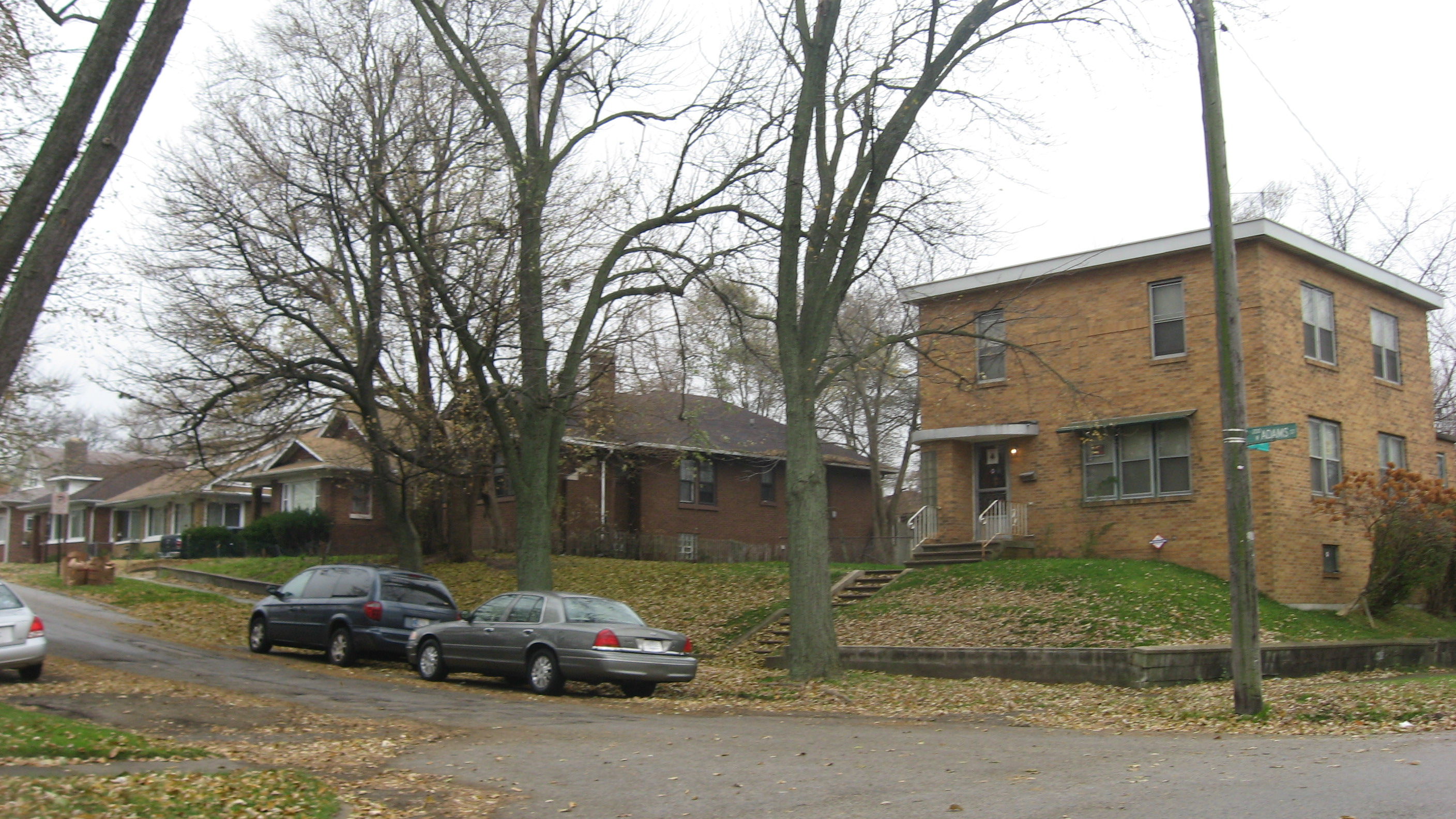
- Adams from 36th, November 2013

- Location within Indiana Location within the United States
- Location: Roughly bounded by Washington St. and 37th, 35th, Jefferson, and Madison Aves., Gary, Indiana
- Coordinates: 41°33′10″N 87°20′21″W
- Area: 22.3 acres (9.0 ha)
- Built: 1922
- Architectural style: Colonial Revival, Tudor Revival, Late Gothic Revival, Mission Revival, Bungalow/Craftsman
- MPS: Historic Residential Suburbs in the United States, 1830-1960 MPS
- NRHP reference No.: 13000723
- Added to NRHP: September 18, 2013

Jefferson Street Historic District is a national historic district located at Gary, Indiana. The district encompasses 81 contributing buildings in an exclusively residential section of Gary. They were largely built between 1922 and 1945, and many reflect the American Small House Movement. Architectural styles include examples of Colonial Revival, Tudor Revival, Late Gothic Revival, Spanish Colonial Revival, and Bungalow / American Craftsman architecture.

It was listed in the National Register of Historic Places in 2013.
