= Louis J. Bailey Branch Library =

- Louis J. Bailey Branch Library-Gary International Institute
- U.S. National Register of Historic Places
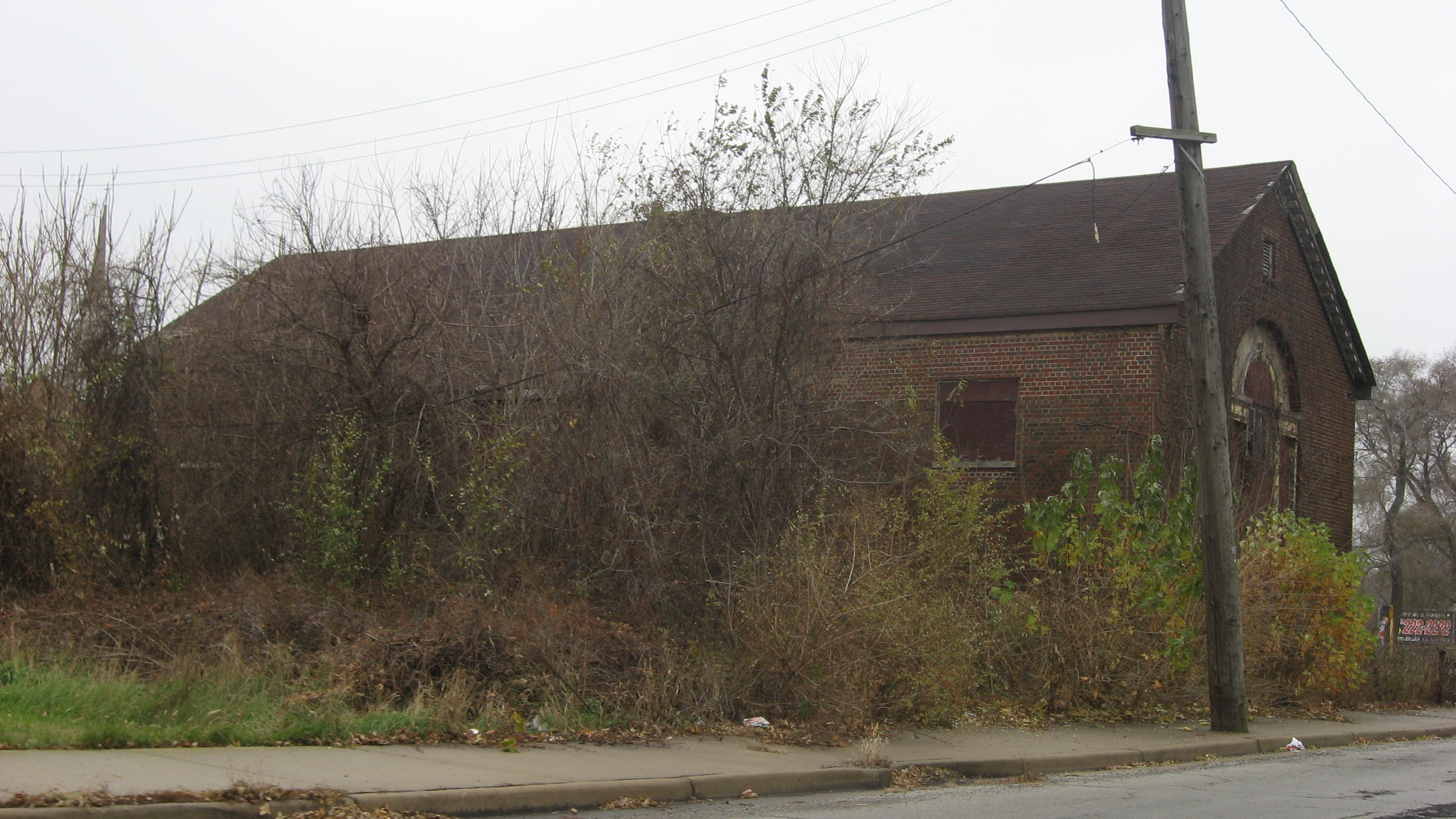
- Louis J. Bailey Branch Library, November 2013

- Location within Indiana Location within the United States
- Location: 1501 W. Madison St., Gary, Indiana
- Coordinates: 41°35′15″N 87°20′28″W
- Area: less than one acre
- Built: 1918
- Built by: Marcellus Gerometta
- Architect: Frank A. Wickes
- Architectural style: Colonial Revival
- NRHP reference No.: 04001102
- Added to NRHP: September 29, 2004

The Louis J. Bailey Branch Library is a historic Carnegie library building located at Gary, Indiana. It was built in 1918, and is a one-story, Colonial Revival style brick building on a raised basement. It has a slate gable roof and projecting entrance block with Corinthian order pilasters. The building was constructed with a $25,000 grant from the Carnegie Foundation. Beginning in 1919, it housed the Gary International Institute in the building's basement. The branch closed about 1963.

It was listed on the National Register of Historic Places in 2004 as the Louis J. Bailey Branch Library-Gary International Institute.
