= Household Saints =

- Theatrical release poster
- Directed by: Nancy Savoca
- Written by: Nancy Savoca; Richard Guay
- Based on: Household Saints by Francine Prose
- Produced by: Peter Newman; Richard Guay
- Starring: Tracey Ullman; Vincent D'Onofrio; Lili Taylor; Judith Malina
- Cinematography: Bobby Bukowski
- Edited by: Elizabeth Kling
- Music by: Stephen Endelman
- Production companies: Jones Entertainment; Peter Newman Productions
- Distributed by: Fine Line Features
- Release date: September 15, 1993; (limited)
- Running time: 124 minutes
- Country: United States
- Language: English
- Box office: $712,418

Household Saints is a 1993 film starring Tracey Ullman, Vincent D'Onofrio and Lili Taylor. It is based on the novel by Francine Prose and directed by Nancy Savoca. The film explores the lives of three generations of Italian-American women over the course of the latter half of the 20th century. The film's executive producer is Jonathan Demme, a long-time friend of Savoca's, and her first real employer in the world of film. In 2023, the film received a 4K restoration from Milestone Films, who later gave the film a theatrical release.

== Plot ==
The film follows three generations of a New York Italian American family, beginning in the 1950s with the courtship and marriage of Catherine Falconetti to local butcher Joseph Santangelo, who wins her hand after beating her father in a game of pinocle. The first half focuses on Catherine adjusting to her new life as a mother and housewife, as well as her strained relationship with her overbearing Old World mother-in-law, Carmela.

The second half focuses on Catherine and Joseph's daughter Teresa, a devout Catholic more similar to her superstitious grandmother than her modernized and secularized parents. As a child and young adult, Teresa puts herself through a series of trials so that she might one day be canonized as a saint. Her desire to become a nun is challenged, however, when she becomes involved with Leonard, an ambitious young man who wishes to marry her.

The film explores both family dynamics over the course of time as well as, on a larger level, the relationship between religious faith in miracles and modernity.

== Cast ==
- Tracey Ullman as Catherine Falconetti
- Vincent D'Onofrio as Joseph Santangelo
- Lili Taylor as Teresa Carmela Santangelo
  - Rachael Bella as young Teresa
- Judith Malina as Carmela Santangelo
- Michael Rispoli as Nicky Falconetti
- Victor Argo as Lino Falconetti
- Michael Imperioli as Leonard Villanova
- Illeana Douglas as Evelyn Santangelo
- Joe Grifasi as Frank Manzone
- Sebastian Roché as Jesus

== Production ==
Nancy Savoca cast many favorite New York City actors for the film which was shot in DeLaurentis/Carolco (now EUE Screen Gems) Studios in Wilmington, North Carolina. The film reunited Lili Taylor with Savoca, with whom she'd previously worked on Dogfight, and Vincent D'Onofrio, with whom she'd appeared in 1988's Mystic Pizza.

Tracey Ullman and Vincent D'Onofrio, as Lili Taylor's screen parents, are only eight years older than she is.

== Release ==
Although the film was met with critical success on release, it had only been released on VHS and remained out of print for years, including the beginnings of the DVD era. By the late 2010s, the film appeared lost, as the only known archival prints had been damaged irreparably.

In 2023, it was announced that Milestone Films had acquired distribution rights to the film, and that a new restoration would have its world premiere at that year's New York Film Festival, preceded by Savoca's 1982 student short Renata. A print had been found amongst the estate of a deceased investor. The 4K restoration began a limited theatrical run in January 2024.

Finally, in April 2024, Kino Lorber released this 4K restoration on both DVD and Blu-ray.

== Reception ==
On review aggregator Rotten Tomatoes, Household Saints has an approval rating of 72% based on 18 reviews. Roger Ebert gave the film four out of four stars and called it a "warm-hearted jewel of a movie" with many scenes that rang true to his Catholic upbringing. He added:

Savoca wants to show how, in only three generations, an Italian family that is comfortable with the mystical turns into an American family that is threatened by it. And she wants to explore the possibilities of sainthood in these secular days. That she sees great humor in her subject is perfect; it is always easier to find the truth through laughter.

=== Accolades ===
The film made The New York Times' Best Films of 1993 list. It was nominated for an Independent Spirit Award for Best Screenplay by Nancy Savoca and Richard Guay. Lili Taylor won an Independent Spirit Award for Best Supporting Female.
