= Jessica Wallenfels =

American choreographer and actress

- Born: Tacoma, Washington, U.S.
- Education: California Institute of the Arts
- Occupations: Actress; choreographer; movement and theatre director; graphic designer

Jessica Wallenfels (sometimes credited as "Jessica Wallenfells") is an American actress, choreographer, movement and theatre director, and graphic designer, notable for her early cult roles in Twin Peaks and the movie Dogfight, along with her later work as a choreographer, director, and stage actress.

Born in Tacoma, Washington, she lived in Los Angeles for many years, and is now artistic director of a non-profit organization in Portland, Oregon called Many Hats Collaboration as well as continuing to work on stage productions and media projects.

== Early life ==
Since the age of 12, Jessica was a dancer and choreographer with her local dance school in Tacoma, and later a Little Red Riding Hood costume character at Never Never Land Amusement Park in Tacoma. She moved to Los Angeles in 1997 to attend California Institute of the Arts.

== Acting roles ==
=== Twin Peaks ===
While still in Washington and in her early teens, she landed a role as an actress working with David Lynch on Twin Peaks (1990). She played Harriet Hayward, the little sister of Lara Flynn Boyle's character, Donna Hayward, and older sister of Gersten Hayward, played by Alicia Witt. She appeared in the acclaimed Pilot Episode and Episode 8, the second-season premiere, both feature-length episodes directed by Lynch. In both appearances, her character Harriet reads poetry she has written, one about the show's iconic character, Laura Palmer.

Entertainment Weekly picked her role as one of "The 30 Best Things About the Twin Peaks Pilot".

=== Other roles ===
She also appeared in Nancy Savoca's Dogfight (1991), an episode of The Tom Show, and in the movies Born to Love You (1999) and String Theory (2004).

=== Stage Roles ===
Among her stage roles, she played Ismene in Antigone. Tertiary. Sexxx. at the Oasis Theatre Company in Los Angeles in 2001, which The LA Times called "tasty.... though not for all tastes".

== Media work ==
In the late 90s, she was a production artist and news reporter for UltimateTV, now Zap2it, and wrote freelance interviews with celebrities for Tribune Media Services's now defunct website TV Quest and various newspaper articles about pop culture. She worked as a graphic designer, designing the Readbooks 2000 website for Hyperion Publishing, plus additional websites for Disney/Hyperion properties, including: Dinosaur, L.A.F., Jump at the Sun, The Cheetah Girls. She also worked with Go.com to promote Disney Books.

== Theatre ==
=== Early projects ===
After moving to LA, she joined Theatre of NOTE after moving there in the late 90s, where her work included choreography for Eden. NOTE was also the development home and venue for her original movement work, Soul Geek.

In 1998, she choreographed movement for Chay Yew's play A Beautiful Country at the Mark Taper Forum.

She choreographed Cornerstone Theatre's "Magic Trix" (Critic's Choice, Backstage West), was named an Associate Artist with CTC, and worked on the award-winning "Broken Hearts - A BH Mystery" (Backstage West Garland), and also choreographed an adaptation of Much Ado About Nothing in Los Angeles.

She conceived, choreographed, directed, and performed in the original movement work Losing It at Glaxa Studios for producer Anthony Byrnes from Mark Taper Forum.

The New York Times mentioned some of her early projects, including a multimedia piece called Bling, part of The New American Living Room festival, saying it "examined black and white consumerism", and The Bridge, a dance-theatre series.

=== Later projects ===
In 2010, she staged a production in Portland of "Find Me Beside You", a rock opera ballet of Van Morrison's Astral Weeks.

In 2017, she directed "Appropriate”, a play about racism and white privilege written by Branden Jacobs-Jenkins, as her MFA project at the University of Portland.

She debuted “The Undertaking”, an original work, in 2019.

In 2020, she was movement director on Charles Grant's Matter (aka Matter 2.0) (2020), a theatre piece and short video inspired by Black Lives Matter, at the Portland Playhouse.

Other work includes Win the War or Tell Me a Story, “Into the Woods” (Broadway Rose), and “The Wolves” (Portland Playhouse).

She co-directed “Everybody” (Artists Repertory Theatre) and the musical “Scarlet” at Portland Playhouse. At Oregon Children's Theatre, she directed “Ella Enchanted”, “Dragons Love Tacos,” and “Pete the Cat”.

She was a choreographer at the Oregon Shakespeare Festival. Regional choreography includes several Shakespeare plays there, “Dancing at Lughnasa” at Seattle Repertory Theatre, original pieces at HERE Arts Center and many more in New York, Walt Disney Concert Hall in Los Angeles, and "Ainadamar" (Tanglewood Music Center).

She has launched work at CoHo Summerfest and intergenerational queer programs.

== Education and teaching ==
Wallenfels has a BFA in Acting from California Institute of the Arts and an MFA from University of Portland. She also attended Dell’Arte International.

She created choreography for productions at Willamette University, Lewis & Clark College, Portland State, and Portland Community College. She directed at Pacific University and Western Oregon University, including Why Cross Chaos at the WOU Theatre (Spring 2018). She taught movement and acting at School of the Arts (California State) between 2011 and 2018.

She has been adjunct faculty at Mt. Hood Community College, University of Portland, and Portland State University. She taught the Portland Playhouse apprentices, worked as an instructor for Dance for Parkinson's in Oregon and - since 2013 - taught for Staged! Conservatory.

== Awards and nominations ==
- Winner (four times): Drammy Award - Outstanding Choreography (shares the 2014-2015 Drammy with Coho Production)
- Winner: PAMTA Award for Outstanding Choreography
- Nominee: The Richard E. Sherwood Award (nominated by The Center Theatre Group and Gordon Davidson)
