= Johanna Went =

American performance artist

Johanna Went is an American performance artist who primarily works in the Los Angeles area.

She started her career in the late 1970s as musician in the punk scene. Music is still an important element of her shows. She has often worked with musician Mark Wheaton, whose fast, rhythmic music beats provide the background noise in several of her performances. Further predominant elements of Went's shows are the use of elaborate costumes, which Went herself creates from various found objects, and the use of artificial blood. The latter played an especially important role in her early work. Went's performances are not strictly text-based. She typically works based on a sketch that determines the rough sequence of actions, but leaves much room for improvisation. Went rarely uses language in her shows as means of communication. She rather sings, screams, whines and murmurs, thus rendering large parts of the spoken words incomprehensible.

In a typical show Went goes through several costume changes, dances, jumps around, sings, plays with often very big props that she frequently tears apart and tosses into the auditorium. Several of her shows culminate in the pouring of artificial blood over her own body, costumes and props. Went's performances thus could be said to foreground the aesthetic quality of fast, spontaneous bodily movement and the material quality of voice and words. The creation of a certain dynamic or energy on stage as well as a certain formalist concern with the quality of colors and material take priority over conveying any particular message.

Critics have frequently characterized Went's shows as "chaotic", "wild" or "shocking". Her work is often seen in context of other women artists of the 1980s, whose performances are regarded as daring and transgressive, such as Karen Finley, Lydia Lunch, Diamanda Galas or Dancenoise.

== Selected performances ==
- Hyena (1982)
- Knifeboxing (1984)
- Interview with Monkey Woman (1986)
- Primate Prisoners (1987)
- Twin, Travel, Terror (1987)
- Ablutions of a Nefarious Nature (2007)

Several of Went's early performances can be seen on her DVD Johanna Went: Club Years (Soleilmoon Recordings, 2007).
