= Dixon Place =

Theater organization in New York City

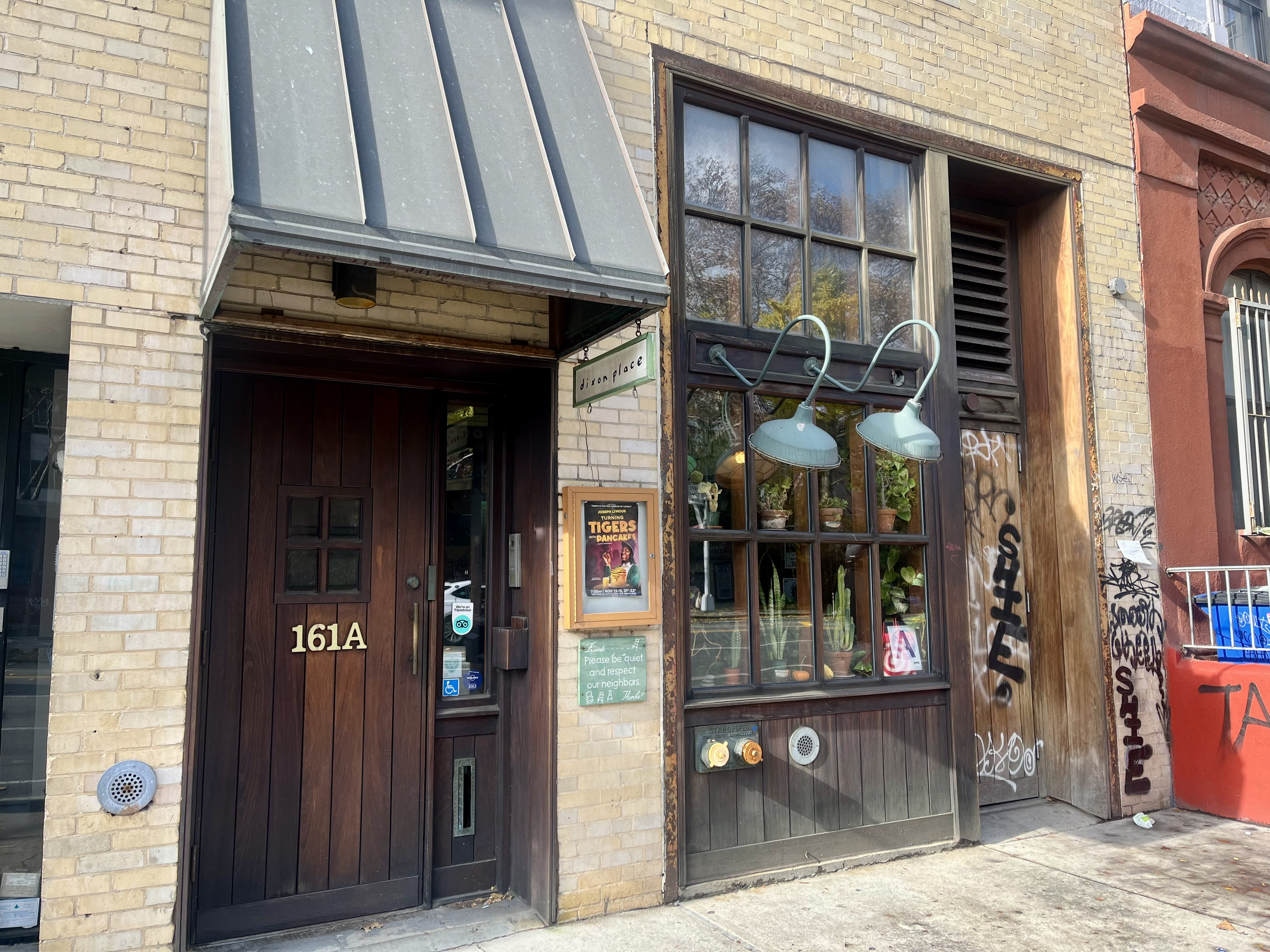
- Dixon Place in 2025
- Interactive map of Dixon Place
- Address: 161A Chrystie Street; New York City; United States
- Coordinates: 40.720428°N 73.992681°W
- Capacity: 130
- Type: Off-Off-Broadway

Construction
- Opened: 1986

Website
- www.dixonplace.org

Dixon Place is a theater organization in New York City dedicated to the development of works-in-progress from a broad range of performers and artists. It exists to serve the creative needs of artists—emerging, mid-career and established—who are creating new work in theater, dance, music, literature, puppetry, performance, variety and visual arts.

Many well-known artists, including Ivy Baldwin, Blue Man Group, Laura Peterson, Monica Bill Barnes, John Leguizamo, Lisa Kron, David Cale, Jane Comfort, Risa Jaroslow, Penny Arcade, Katy Pyle, Peggy Shaw, Douglas Dunn, Deb Margolin and Reno, began their careers at Dixon Place.

Dixon Place offers 14 shows a week, 7–8 commissions a year, and more than twenty different programs across artistic disciplines, featuring work by more than 1,500 emerging and established artists each year. All artists presenting work in Dixon Place's main-stage programs receive compensation, from work-in-progress showings to artists-in-residence and commissioned artists.

== History ==
=== Origins ===
Dixon Place was founded in 1985 by Artistic Director Ellie Covan. After starting Dixon Place as a salon in her Paris apartment in the summer of 1985, Covan re-launched the endeavor in her East Village living room the following year. Her apartment was half of a storefront; she set up folding chairs for audiences and sold drinks and snacks to defray her expenses. After five years at the East Village location, Dixon Place needed to expand. In order to accommodate a growing audience, Dixon Place moved to a larger space on the Bowery in 1991. The loft also served as living space for Covan.

Expanded programming, along with an increased staff and audience, prompted another move in 1999, when Dixon Place became the resident company at the Vineyard Theater's 26th Street space. Success in this professional environment led to the decision to secure a permanent home. In 2002, in partnership with a dedicated Board and a forward-thinking developer, Dixon Place purchased an industrial space on Chrystie Street in Lower Manhattan. After a six-year capital funding project, Dixon Place's laboratory theater and lounge, featuring expanded amenities for artists and audiences and new earned income for Dixon Place, had its grand opening in December 2009.

=== Performances ===
Many notable artists started their careers at Dixon Place. This includes Reno.

== Facility ==
In addition to a laboratory theater, the new space, designed by Meyer + Gifford Architects, includes artist amenities.

=== Commissions ===
In 1994, Dixon Place began the Mondo Cane! Commissioning Program that supports eight theater, dance and music creators annually by providing them with 1-3 months of workshop time, followed by 1-4 weeks of production performances. Mondo Cane! has offered commissions to such artists as The Civilians, The Debate Society and Sibyl Kempson.

=== Curated Series ===
Dixon Place offers over twenty year-round, curated programs:

- Mondo Cane! Commissioning Program - theater, music, and dance commissions; 7-8 per year.
- Artists-in-Residence - 3-4 month residencies for emerging artists/ensembles; three per year.
- Performance Works-In-Progress - new, developing work by theater, dance, music, and performance artists; ongoing.
- Puppet Blok - new puppetry, mask, animation and other alternative forms; ongoing.
- Carousel - a wide array of comic strip makers, graphic novelists, visual artists and luminaries presenting new work; 4-5 per year.
- Little Theatre - OBIE award-winning series that presents experimental theater, performance art, music and dance; ten per year.
- Bindlestiff Open Stage Variety Show - an "uncompromising" theatrical experience that includes aerial artists, wire walkers, sword swallowers, Kung Fu juggling, clown bands, trained rats, and more; ten per year.
- No Holds Barred - a "magical night" featuring gifted professional and student aerial, circus, theater and dance artists, 3-6 per year.
- Crossing Boundaries - choreographers who cross cultural, geographical and disciplinary boundaries; 5-6 per year.
- Under Exposed - emerging choreographers, 6-8 per year.
- Brink - a platform for innovative and investigatory choreographers to show longer, more developed works in progress; 5-6 per year.
- Moving Men - choreography by both male and female choreographers working with only male dancers, 2-3 per year.
- NYC10 - a monthly dance project that gives ten emerging dance companies up to ten minutes to showcase their work; 5-6 per year.
- Gershwin Live at Dixon Place - an evolving 21st century salon, artists with "fearless and distinctive voices" are given free rein to present theater, film, cabaret, ghost stories, music and uncategorizable hybrids; monthly.
- Experiments & Disorders - fiction, nonfiction, poetry and performance texts by adventurous, cross-genre, established and emerging writers; 6-8 per year - curated by Christen Clifford.
- QT - a quarterly literary series exploring the lives of LGBTQ writers; three per year.
- Communitas - this literary series brings together writers, authors, readers, storytellers, and audiences from the many communities of New York City and beyond to showcase what's next for the city; three per year.
- Secret City - features performance, visual art, music, food, and literature; monthly.
- Lounge Music - free, acoustic music of all genres; 4-6 nights per week.
- The Gallery - rotating solo and group exhibitions with an emphasis on showcasing work by NYC-)-based artists.
- HOT! The NYC Celebration of Queer Culture - annual summer festival featuring LGBTQ works from across genres.
- Murrin Award ("Tommies") – The Tom Murrin Performance Award is an annual award selected by a panel of artistic directors and producers granted to an emerging artist who "embodies Tom's generous artistic spirit & gift for unearthing big, meaningful ideas by creating enlightening performance". First awarded in 2013 to ANIMALS (Nikki Calonge, Michael De Angelis and Mike Mikos) and in 2014 to Andrew Schneider.

== Awards ==
In 1990, The Village Voice awarded Dixon Place a special OBIE Award.

- 1989: Covan received the New York Dance and Performance Award—–a "Bessie"—–for service to the community.
- 1998: Dixon Place received the City University of New York’s Edwin Booth Award for excellence in theater.
- 1999: Covan was awarded The Voice’s Ross Wetzsteon Award for contributions to the community.
- 2002: Covan received the Brooklyn Arts Exchange BAXten Award for paving the way for others through arts administration.
- 2004: Dixon Place was awarded the Alliance of New York State Arts Organization’s Celebrate the Arts Award for outstanding contributions to the state of New York.
- 2010: The organization received the Stewardship Award from the New York Innovative Theater Foundation.
- 2022: Covan included in 50 Key Figures in Queer US Theatre, with a profile written by performance scholar Jeff McMahon.

== Sources of funding ==
Private and Corporate Support for Dixon Place is provided by: Axe-Houghton Foundation, Bernstein Family Foundation, New York Department of Cultural Affairs, Doris Duke Foundation, Harkness Foundation for Dance, The Jim Henson Foundation, Jerome Foundation, Andrew W. Mellon Foundation, Mertz Gilmore Foundation, Jerome Robbins Foundation, Fan Fox & Leslie R. Samuels Foundation, New York State Council on the Arts, The Peg Santvoord Foundation, The Shubert Foundation.
