= Grace Santos =

Grace Santos may refer to:

- Grace Santos, character in The 24 Hour Woman
- Grace Santos, character in Aso ni San Roque
