= Crown Point, Indiana =

- City
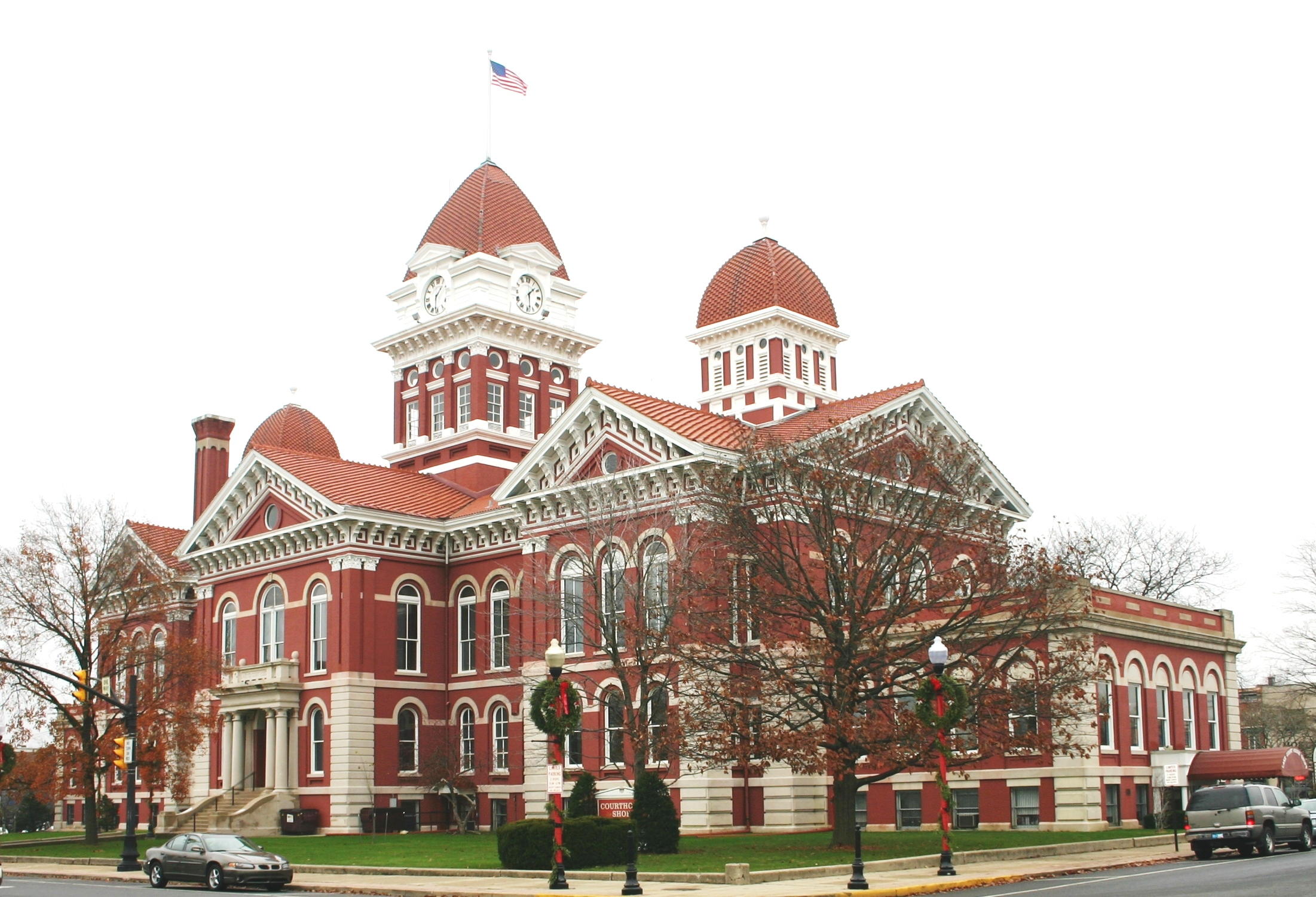
- Lake County courthouse in Crown Point

- Seal
- Nickname: Hub of Lake County
- Interactive map of Crown Point, Indiana
- Location within Indiana Location within the United States
- Coordinates: 41°24′05″N 87°21′22″W
- Country: United States
- State: Indiana
- County: Lake
- Townships: Center and Ross
- Established: October 31, 1834
- Incorporated (town): June 3, 1868
- Incorporated (city): June 6, 1911

Government
  - Type: City Council
  - Mayor: Pete Land (D)

Area
  - Total: 17.98 sq mi (46.58 km^{2})
  - Land: 17.93 sq mi (46.44 km^{2})
  - Water: 0.054 sq mi (0.14 km^{2})
- Elevation: 717 ft (219 m)

Population (2020)
  - Total: 33,899
  - Density: 1,890.6/sq mi (729.98/km^{2})
- Time zone: UTC-6 (CST)
  - Summer (DST): UTC-5 (CDT)
- ZIP codes: 46307-46308
- Area code: 219
- FIPS code: 18-16138
- GNIS feature ID: 2393682
- Website: crownpoint.in.gov

Crown Point is a city in and the county seat of Lake County, Indiana, United States. The population was 34,884 per the 2023 American Community Survey. The city was incorporated in 1868. On October 31, 1834, Solon Robinson and his family became the first settlers to an area that later became Crown Point. Due to its location, Crown Point is known as the "Hub of Lake County".

The city is surrounded by Merrillville to the north, Winfield to the east, Cedar Lake to the southwest, St. John to the west, and unincorporated Schererville to the northwest. The southern and southwestern parts of Crown Point border some unincorporated areas of Lake County.

== History ==
On October 31, 1834, Solon Robinson and his family became the first settlers to stake a claim in the area that would eventually become Crown Point. In February 1837, Lake County was incorporated, with Liverpool, Indiana, as the county seat. Later that year, Solon Robinson funded a US$500 project to build a new wooden county courthouse in Crown Point, and the legislature was delighted to designate it as the county seat. It was not until 1868 that Crown Point was incorporated as a town.

In 1878, construction began on a new, larger county court house and clock tower. This new court house, now known as the Grand Old Lady, was built in the center of town and became the dominant feature of Crown Point (further additions to this courthouse would be made from 1907 to 1928). Campaigning for the presidency of the United States, William Jennings Bryan addressed a crowd from the steps of the courthouse in 1896. In 1897 a crowd of 4,000 gathered to watch a winning harness racing horse bred by noted Chicago theater manager Will J. Davis and his famous wife, contralto Jessie Bartlett Davis. The Davises bred trotters and dogs at their Crown Point farm c. 1885–1917. Crown Point was the site of the first Cobe Trophy automobile race, won by Louis Chevrolet in 1909.

On June 6, 1911, Crown Point was reincorporated as a city.

The Old Lake County Courthouse was placed on the National Register of Historic Places in 1974, and the new Lake County Government Center opened on the north side of the city the next year.

Because Crown Point had no waiting period for marriage licenses, the city became a popular place for couples to marry; it became known as the "Marriage Mill". Many famous people came to Crown Point to marry, including Tom Mix, Rudolph Valentino, Muhammad Ali, and Jackson 5 patriarch Joseph Jackson and their wives. Certain online sources claim that Ronald Reagan and Jane Wyman were married in Crown Point. But Reagan and Wyman were married in Glendale, California, according to sources such as Fox News, The Washington Post, and the Los Angeles Times.

The Walter Allman House, Wellington A. Clark House, Crown Point Courthouse Square Historic District, Lake County Courthouse, Lake County Tuberculosis Sanatorium, Nurses Home and Superintendent's House, Lake County Sheriff's House and Jail, Albert Maack House, and William Whitaker Landscape and House are listed on the National Register of Historic Places.

Locally designated residential historic districts include:

- Sunnyside Historic District, includes St. Mary's Church and School and surrounding homes.
- Holley Historic District, includes 20 homes and one church, including former Sheriff Lillian Holley's home at the southeast corner of South and East streets.

=== Gangster era ===
On March 3, 1934, FBI "Public Enemy #1" John Dillinger escaped from the "escape-proof" (as it was dubbed by local authorities at the time) Lake County Jail, which was guarded by many police and national guardsmen. Dillinger apparently escaped while brandishing a hand-carved wooden gun blackened with shoe polish, although this was disputed by some witnesses. Dillinger further embarrassed the city, as well as the 42-year-old female sheriff Lillian Holley, by driving off in her brand new V-8 Ford. The press augmented her chagrin with such headlines as: "Slim woman, mother of twins, controlled Dillinger as sheriff." Incensed, Holley declared at the time, "If I ever see John Dillinger again, I'll shoot him dead with my own gun. Don't blame anyone else for this escape. Blame me. I have no political career ahead of me and I don't care." Furthermore, Holley made certain the Dillinger name would have no standing in Crown Point up until Holley's death in 1994 at 103.

=== Public Enemies (film) ===
In March 2008, a Universal Studios team, under the direction of Michael Mann, visited Crown Point to film parts of the movie Public Enemies at the former county jail facility from which Dillinger escaped. The crime drama is set during The Great Depression with the focus on FBI agent Melvin Purvis's attempt to stop criminals John Dillinger, Baby Face Nelson, and Pretty Boy Floyd. Christian Bale plays FBI agent Purvis, and Johnny Depp plays Dillinger. Actress Lili Taylor portrayed Sheriff Holley in the film. The shoot took three days to complete and involved a number of scenes inside the former Sheriff's house and jail. A scene was constructed for filming the exterior. Depp was on the set for all three days and stayed late into the evenings each night to shake hands with hundreds of fans who stood for hours to see him and the film shoot. The movie was released in June 2009.

== Geography ==
Crown Point lies on the Valparaiso Moraine.

According to the 2010 census, Crown Point has a total area of 17.725 square miles (45.91 km^{2}), of which 17.71 square miles (45.87 km^{2}) (or 99.92%) is land and 0.015 square miles (0.04 km^{2}) (or 0.08%) is water.

Crown Point is situated approximately 40 miles southeast of Chicago's Loop.

== Demographics ==
Historical population
Census	Pop.	Note	%±
1880	1,708		—
1890	1,907		11.7%
1900	2,336		22.5%
1910	2,526		8.1%
1920	3,232		27.9%
1930	4,046		25.2%
1940	4,643		14.8%
1950	5,839		25.8%
1960	8,443		44.6%
1970	10,931		29.5%
1980	16,455		50.5%
1990	17,728		7.7%
2000	19,806		11.7%
2010	27,317		37.9%
2020	33,899		24.1%
Source: US Census Bureau

=== Racial and ethnic composition ===
Crown Point city, Indiana – Racial and ethnic composition Note: the US Census treats Hispanic/Latino as an ethnic category. This table excludes Latinos from the racial categories and assigns them to a separate category. Hispanics/Latinos may be of any race.
Race / Ethnicity (NH = Non-Hispanic)	Pop 2000	Pop 2010	Pop 2020	% 2000	% 2010	% 2020
White alone (NH)	18,354	22,606	25,326	92.67%	82.75%	74.71%
Black or African American alone (NH)	275	1,687	2,419	1.39%	6.18%	7.14%
Native American or Alaska Native alone (NH)	28	29	41	0.14%	0.11%	0.12%
Asian alone (NH)	194	475	961	0.98%	1.74%	2.83%
Native Hawaiian or Pacific Islander alone (NH)	6	2	2	0.03%	0.01%	0.01%
Other race alone (NH)	16	42	87	0.08%	0.15%	0.26%
Mixed race or Multiracial (NH)	140	263	1,148	0.71%	0.96%	3.39%
Hispanic or Latino (any race)	793	2,213	3,915	4.00%	8.10%	11.55%
Total	19,806	27,317	33,899	100.00%	100.00%	100.00%

=== 2020 census ===
As of the 2020 census, Crown Point had a population of 33,899. The median age was 40.2 years. 23.0% of residents were under the age of 18 and 18.6% of residents were 65 years of age or older. For every 100 females there were 96.3 males, and for every 100 females age 18 and over there were 93.2 males age 18 and over.

99.2% of residents lived in urban areas, while 0.8% lived in rural areas.

There were 12,815 households in Crown Point, of which 32.4% had children under the age of 18 living in them. Of all households, 52.7% were married-couple households, 15.7% were households with a male householder and no spouse or partner present, and 26.0% were households with a female householder and no spouse or partner present. About 26.8% of all households were made up of individuals and 12.9% had someone living alone who was 65 years of age or older.

There were 13,375 housing units, of which 4.2% were vacant. The homeowner vacancy rate was 0.9% and the rental vacancy rate was 7.2%.

Racial composition as of the 2020 census
Race	Number	Percent
White	26,508	78.2%
Black or African American	2,505	7.4%
American Indian and Alaska Native	121	0.4%
Asian	982	2.9%
Native Hawaiian and Other Pacific Islander	4	0.0%
Some other race	994	2.9%
Two or more races	2,785	8.2%
Hispanic or Latino (of any race)	3,915	11.5%

=== 2010 census ===
As of the census of 2010, there were 27,317 people, 10,394 households, and 7,001 families residing in the city. The population density was 1,542.5 inhabitants per square mile (595.6/km^{2}). There were 10,976 housing units at an average density of 619.8 per square mile (239.3/km^{2}). The racial makeup of the city was 88.2% White, 6.3% African American, 0.2% Native American, 1.8% Asian, 1.9% from other races, and 1.6% from two or more races. Hispanic or Latino of any race were 8.1% of the population.

There were 10,394 households, of which 29.5% had children under the age of 18 living with them, 53.6% were married couples living together, 10.0% had a female householder with no husband present, 3.8% had a male householder with no wife present, and 32.6% were non-families. 27.5% of all households were made up of individuals, and 11.7% had someone living alone who was 65 years of age or older. The average household size was 2.45 and the average family size was 3.01.

The median age in the city was 39.6 years. 21.2% of residents were under the age of 18; 8% were between the ages of 18 and 24; 27.7% were from 25 to 44; 26.9% were from 45 to 64; and 16.1% were 65 years of age or older. The gender makeup of the city was 50.0% male and 50.0% female.

=== 2000 census ===
As of the census of 2000, there were 19,806 people, 7,824 households, and 5,359 families residing in the city. The population density was 1,191.7 inhabitants per square mile (460.1/km^{2}). There were 8,166 housing units at an average density of 491.3 per square mile (189.7/km^{2}). The racial makeup of the city was 95.32% White, 1.41% African American, 0.18% Native American, 0.98% Asian, 0.04% Pacific Islander, 1.02% from other races, and 1.04% from two or more races. Hispanic or Latino of any race were 4.00% of the population.

There were 7,824 households, out of which 29.2% had children under the age of 18 living with them, 57.1% were married couples living together, 8.9% had a female householder with no husband present, and 31.5% were non-families. 27.3% of all households were made up of individuals, and 11.7% had someone living alone who was 65 years of age or older. The average household size was 2.45 and the average family size was 3.01.

In the city, the population was spread out, with 22.5% under the age of 18, 7.7% from 18 to 24, 27.2% from 25 to 44, 25.3% from 45 to 64, and 17.3% who were 65 years of age or older. The median age was 40 years. For every 100 females, there were 90.3 males. For every 100 females age 18 and over, there were 87.2 males.

=== Income ===
The estimated median income for a household in the city in 2013 was $63,121 while the mean income for a household in the town was $78,090. Additionally, the median income for a family was $75,112 and the mean income for a family was $90,507. The estimated per capita income for the town was $31,177. About 4.3% of families and 7.0% of the population were estimated to be below the poverty line.

== Government ==
The government consists of a mayor and a city council. The mayor is Pete Land, the former chief of police. The city council consists of seven members. Five are elected from individual districts. Two are elected at-large.

== Education ==
Crown Point residents who live in Center Township are served by the Crown Point Community School Corporation. Residents who live in Ross Township are served by the Merrillville Community School Corporation.

Public schools in Crown Point are administered by the Crown Point Community School Corporation:

- Crown Point High School
- Robert A. Taft Middle School
- Colonel John Wheeler Middle School
- Timothy Ball Elementary School
- Eisenhower Elementary School
- Lake Street Elementary School
- Solon Robinson Elementary School
- Crossroads Alternative Achievement Center

Private schools:

- Pathway Christian School
- Trinity Lutheran School
- St. Mary Catholic Community School
- Avicenna Academy

Private Colleges:

- Hyles-Anderson College
- University of Saint Francis

Public library: The city has a lending library, the Crown Point Community Public Library with two branches.

== Transportation ==
=== Commuter Bus ===
Gary Public Transportation Corporation provides bus service along the 93rd Avenue corridor; with plans to expand bus service within the city along the Broadway corridor from 93rd Avenue to the north terminating at US-231 to the south. These plans are known as the "Livable Broadway Plan" that aims to allow easy travel by public transportation between Gary, Merrillville, and Crown Point and to encourage transit-oriented development at each hub. The first steps of this plan were realized with the Broadway Metro Express.

In 2017, the city explored commuter bus service to Chicago similar to the ChicaGo Dash service that Valparaiso has operated since 2008; however, the plans have not yet come to fruition.

=== Commuter Rail ===
Most Crown Point commuters to Chicago are served by the South Shore Line rail stations via either Gary Metro Center in Gary or East Chicago station in East Chicago; however beginning in 2026, many Crown Point residents--particularly those in the western part of the city--may find it more convenient to be served by Munster/Dyer station in Munster, Indiana. It opened on March 31, 2026. The main station and parking lots are in Munster while overflow parking is in Dyer.

=== Intercity Rail ===
The Pennsylvania Railroad's Chicago to Columbus line and the Erie Lackawanna's Jersey City to Chicago line served Crown Point and had commuter service to and from Chicago. Both rail lines have been abandoned.

== Lake County Court House ==
The old Lake County Court House is prominently situated in the center of Crown Point, which is commonly referred to simply as the square. The first portion of the court house was erected in 1878, with portions being added on all the way up to 1928. Inside the "Grand Old Lady", there are gift shops, a record shop, and a museum which is located on the second floor.

== Lake County Fairgrounds ==
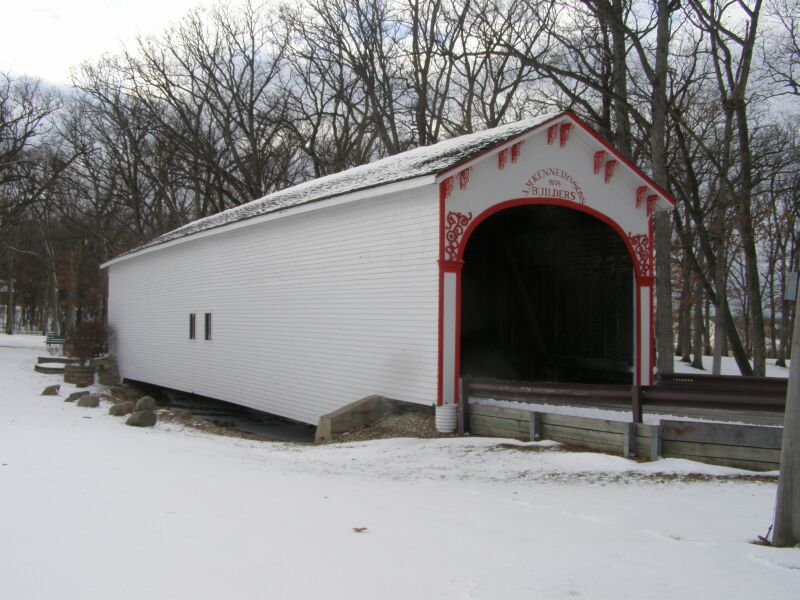
The Crown Point Bridge

The Lake County Fairgrounds are located near the southern portion of Crown Point. The fairgrounds include historic brick exhibition buildings, tree covered hills, rambling walking paths and a historic grandstand near the retired swimming area at Fancher Lake. The Crown Point Bridge, an 85-foot, single span Burr Arch Truss bridge, is the county's only covered bridge. It was originally built in 1878 near Milroy in Rush County and relocated to the northwest area of the fairgrounds over a gully in 1933.

== Crown Point Sportsplex ==
The Crown Point Sportsplex is a 95-acre multi-use outdoor sports and event destination conveniently located off I-65. The facility currently features two synthetic turf multi-purpose fields, 10 natural grass, illuminated fields, and champion field with stadium seating. Accompanying these sports amenities, are two fully equipped support buildings that include restrooms, concessions and storage.

== Events ==
The Lake County Fair, the 2nd-largest county fair in the state of Indiana, is held on the fairgrounds each year in early August for 10 days. The Lake County Fair always boasts monster trucks, demolition derby, and an entire arena for horse shows.

The Corn Roast and the Taste of Crown Point, annual festivals featuring food and entertainment, are held downtown around the historic courthouse.

There are also parades held on Memorial Day, Independence Day, and St. Patrick's Day.

== Notable people ==
- Logan Gomez, Racing driver
- William G. Haan, World War I general
- Ambrose Stephen McDonald, Wisconsin state legislator and businessman
- Chad Patrick, Milwaukee Brewers pitcher
- Dan Plesac, Former Major League pitcher and MLB Network analyst
- Zach Plesac, Los Angeles Angels pitcher
- Richie Roberts, Wide receivers coach
- Jerry L. Ross, Astronaut
- Sasha Stefanovic, Former Purdue basketball guard
- Thelma Strabel, Novelist
- John Wheeler, Civil War officer
- Dean White, entrepreneur and billionaire
- Ralph H. Young, former head football coach at Michigan State
- Jesse Mendez, Wrestler
- Nabeel Ashraf, co-recipient of the 2008 Nobel Prize in Physiology or Medicine

== See also ==
- Lake County Sheriff's Department
- Indiana State Police
