= Lake County Sheriff's Department (Indiana) =

- Abbreviation: LCSD

Agency overview
- Formed: 1837; 189 years ago
- Employees: 494

Jurisdictional structure
- Operations jurisdiction: Lake County, Indiana, United States
- Jurisdiction of Lake County Sheriff's Department
- Area: Total 627 sq mi (1,623 km^{2}): Land 499 sq mi (1,292 km^{2}); Water 128 sq mi (330 km^{2})
- Population: 496,005 (2010)
- Legal jurisdiction: Lake County, Indiana
- General nature: Local civilian police

Operational structure
- Headquarters: 2293 North Main Street; Crown Point, Indiana
- Merit officers: 168 (police officers); 170 (corrections officers)
- Civilian employees: 156
- Agency executives: Oscar Martinez, Jr., Sheriff; Vincent M. Balbo, Chief of Police; Edward G. Jenkins, Deputy Chief of Police

Facilities
- Police Boats: 7
- Helicopters: 3

Website
- Lake County Sheriff's Website

The Lake County Sheriff's Department is the county law enforcement agency for Lake County, Indiana.

== History ==
The first sheriff was elected in 1837, when Lake County was organized.

Notorious gangster John Dillinger was held in the Lake County jail from January 1934 to March, when he escaped. The sheriff at the time was Lillian Holley, who held the office after the previous sheriff, her husband Roy, was shot and killed: although the media mocked her for Dillinger's escape, the fault lay with the prison warden and his officers.

In 1975, the Sheriff was found in contempt for failing to improve conditions at the jail.

In 1985, Sheriff Rudy Bartolomei was indicted on corruption charges. Bartolomei later turned state witness and was placed in witness protection after providing testimony against several Lake County political figures.

In 1990 the burned body of a deputy and his wife were found in a car in Gary, Indiana. The deputy was due to testify in a federal racketeering trial against a Merrillville town councilman.

In 2016, Sheriff John Buncich was indicted on federal public corruption and bribery charges. His chief deputy and another person were also named in the charges.

In 2021, officers of the Crown Point, Indiana police department began to pursue a vehicle for speeding 90 mph in a posted 45 mph zone. The vehicle was being driven by Sheriff Oscar Martinez Jr., who activated the emergency lights on the vehicle, after which the police stopped their pursuit. The county commissioners soon sent a letter to the county prosecutor asking for an investigation into alleged misuse of county vehicles. In January 2022, Martinez was indicted on charges of resisting law enforcement and reckless driving. Martinez called the indictment a "witch hunt" and nevertheless ran for office in the 2022 election. In February 2024, Martinez pleaded guilty to reckless driving, a misdemeanor, in exchange for a felony charge of resisting law enforcement to be dropped by prosecutors and was sentenced to sixty days probation.

== Organization ==
The Lake County Sheriff's Department employs 168 sworn police officers, 170 sworn corrections officers and 156 civilians under the sheriff's direction.

The command staff includes a chief of police and four commanders, each responsible for a division, who are assisted by deputy commanders. The Corrections Division is led by a chief warden, an assistant warden and three deputy wardens.

- Staff Services Division consists of the Bureau of Information, Bookkeeping, Human Resources, Property/Evidence Management, Telecommunications, Training and Vehicle Maintenance Operations.
- Civil Division is charged with serving summons, subpoenas, evictions and writs of the Lake County Superior and Circuit courts as well as from other jurisdictions.
- Corrections Division operates the Lake County Jail and administers the Work Release Program designed as an alternative to incarceration for non-violent offenders. The modern Lake County Jail opened in 1975 in a five-floor facility with 286 beds. In 1991, capacity was increased to 460 beds and additions in 2000 provided for a total of 1,085 beds. A Special Operations Response Team (SORT) is utilized in controlling inmate disturbances and restoring order in emergency situations.
- Criminal Investigations Division comprises the General Assignment, Auto Theft, Special Victims Unit, and Warrant units as well as the Crime Laboratory and officers assigned to multi-jurisdictional task forces.
- Uniform Division primarily provides police service to the unincorporated areas of the county and in the town of Winfield which does not have an established police department. This division also maintains an organized Bicycle Unit as well as a Traffic Unit which utilizes both patrol vehicles and motorcycles for enforcement and has trained accident reconstructionists. The Court Security Unit provides security at all county courts located at the Lake County Government Center and at facilities in East Chicago, Gary and Hammond.

The department also has a number of Special Operations Units with specifically trained personnel assigned for Aquatics Underwater Recovery and Rescue, Aviation, Bomb Squad, Chaplains, K-9, Marine, Tactical (SWAT) and a mobile communications Command Center.

== Aircraft ==
The Lake County Sheriff's Department has three helicopters used for law enforcement in the county and for assistance to local police agencies. They are maintained by the Aviation Unit and are operated from the Griffith-Merrillville Airport in Griffith, Indiana.

According to FAA records, the helicopters currently registered to the agency include a Bell OH-58A N512LC, a Bell OH-58A N513LC and a Eurocopter EC120B N516RD.

== Demographics ==
Demographics
Male	93%
Female	7%
White	71%
African-American	16%
Hispanic	13%
Asian	0%

== Fallen officers ==
In the history of the Lake County Sheriff's Department, seven officers have been killed in the line of duty.

Name	Date of death	Age	Tenure	Cause of death
Deputy Sheriff George R. Zorodny	March 14, 1930	38	1 year	Motorcycle accident
Sheriff Roy F. Holley	January 17, 1933	43	2 years	Gunfire
Special Deputy Sheriff Charles E. McKinney	March 21, 1984	51	10 years	Gunfire
Sergeant William G. Paterson	January 25, 1994	44	18 years	Vehicular pursuit
Deputy Paul W. Mitchell	June 12, 1999	24	1 year	Automobile accident
Deputy Chief Gary L. Martin	August 22, 2006	63	28½ years	Bicycle accident
Correctional Officer Britney R. Meux	March 6, 2012	25	3 years	Vehicular assault

== See also ==
- Lake County, Indiana
- List of law enforcement agencies in Indiana
- Sheriff
