= Reno (comedian) =

American stand-up comedian and actress (born 1956)

- Born: Karen Reno; 1956 (age 69–70); United States

Comedy career
- Medium: Stand-up, television, film
- Genres: Observational comedy, satire, political satire, sarcasm
- Subjects: American culture, sex, everyday life, human behavior, American politics, pop culture

Reno is an American stand-up comedian and actress known for such films as Quiz Show, The Manchurian Candidate, The Hard Way and Kinsey.

"The comic grew up as Karen Reno, but dropped the first name when she began performing, perhaps to rank up there with such single-named celebs as Cher and Madonna (well, why not?)," wrote Joe Brown in The Washington Post. "An untamed peroxide blonde, with dark roots, Reno was an Hispanic orphan adopted as an infant by a white middle-class couple on Long Island, and the experience gave her an outsider's perspective and anger. 'I just felt left out,' she says. 'If I walked down the street and looked at the houses, I wanted to cry. ... I wasn't one of the groovy kids. The only time I had a good time was when I was being funny.'"

She started her career performing in San Francisco troupes such as Lilith and Strange Fruit. As a solo act, she performed at so-called "alternative spaces" in San Francisco and New York such as the Pyramid Club, King Tut's Wah-Wah Hut, and P.S. 122 in New York's East Village. It was while on stage at the latter venue that she was approached by an HBO talent scout, which led to the 1995 special Reno: In Rage and Rehab. The special was adapted from her Off-Broadway show that featured material including her addiction to crystal meth.

Reno has been frequently described as "a Latina lesbian with radical political leanings" noted for having a cult following as well as being "queen of wild tangents."

Reno Finds Her Mom was a 1998 "semidocumentary about her search for the birth mother who abandoned her." Directed by Lydia Dean Pilcher, it was described by Chicago Reader as spanning styles "from comic-book graphics to gritty film noir." In the film, "Reno gets harebrained advice from fairy godmother Lily Tomlin, while Mary Tyler Moore appears as Reno’s mother, an icy WASP straight out of Ordinary People. The real-life stuff is even more absorbing, especially when Reno confronts the arrogant adoption agency that guards the secret of her origins. Reno’s meeting with her mother proves anticlimactic–the woman refused to be filmed–but the real payoff comes from watching Reno howl with delight at each revelation. In the end she discovers how little her past matters: she can never go home."

She also hosted her own 2001 reality documentary television series on Bravo entitled Citizen Reno which was produced by Lily Tomlin and Jane Wagner.

She also starred in the 2002 concert film Reno: Rebel without a Pause directed by Nancy Savoca. Her stage persona was described as "a combination of Richard Lewis, Ethel Merman, and a raving derelict," according to The A.V. Club's Scott Tobias.

Reno has remained in relative obscurity due to her often incendiary political commentary. "I'm way too underground for people to give a shit, I guess," she told Salon, "although the whole time I've been performing I've been purposefully excluded from the main shows -- like Dave Letterman, the night before I was supposed to go on his show, someone called and said I would freak him out.

"I only go so far as people want me to. It's very important to be funny: If you're not funny, you're a politician, and no one trusts politicians."
