= Albert Maack House =

Historic house in Indiana, United States

- U.S. National Register of Historic Places
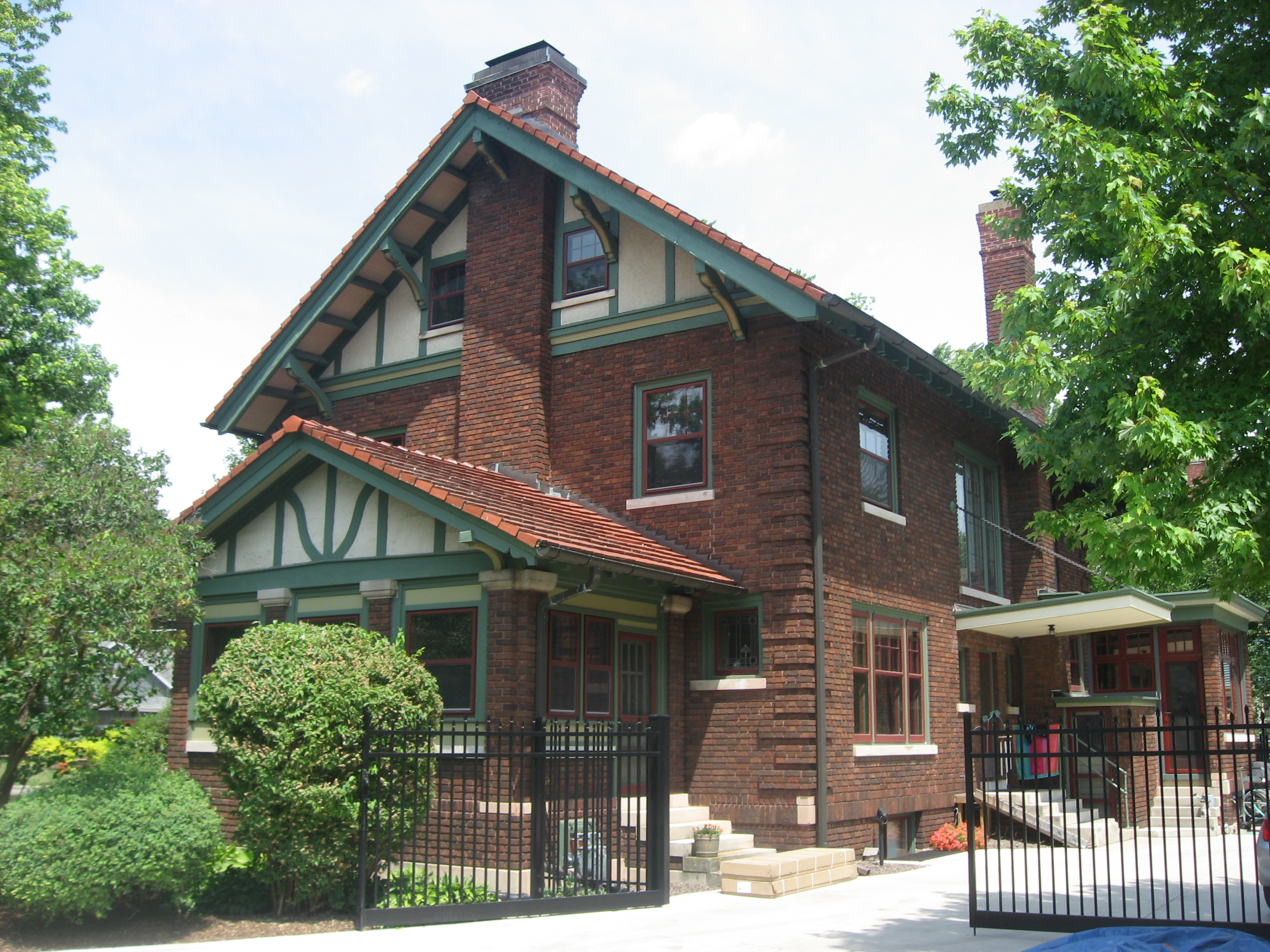
- Albert Maack House, June 2012

- Location within Indiana Location within the United States
- Location: 498 S. Court St., Crown Point, Indiana
- Coordinates: 41°24′34″N 87°21′58″W
- Area: Less than 1 acre (0.40 ha)
- Built: 1913
- Architectural style: Tudor Revival
- NRHP reference No.: 11000383
- Added to NRHP: December 27, 2010

Albert Maack House is a historic home located at Crown Point, Indiana, United States. It was built in 1913, and is a 2 1/2-story, Tudor Revival style brick dwelling with a cross gable roof sheathed in clay tile. It features stucco walls with exposed timbers on the gables, cut stone window sills, and leaded, stained glass windows.

It was listed in the National Register of Historic Places in 2010.
