= Wellington A. Clark House =

Historic house in Indiana, United States

- U.S. National Register of Historic Places
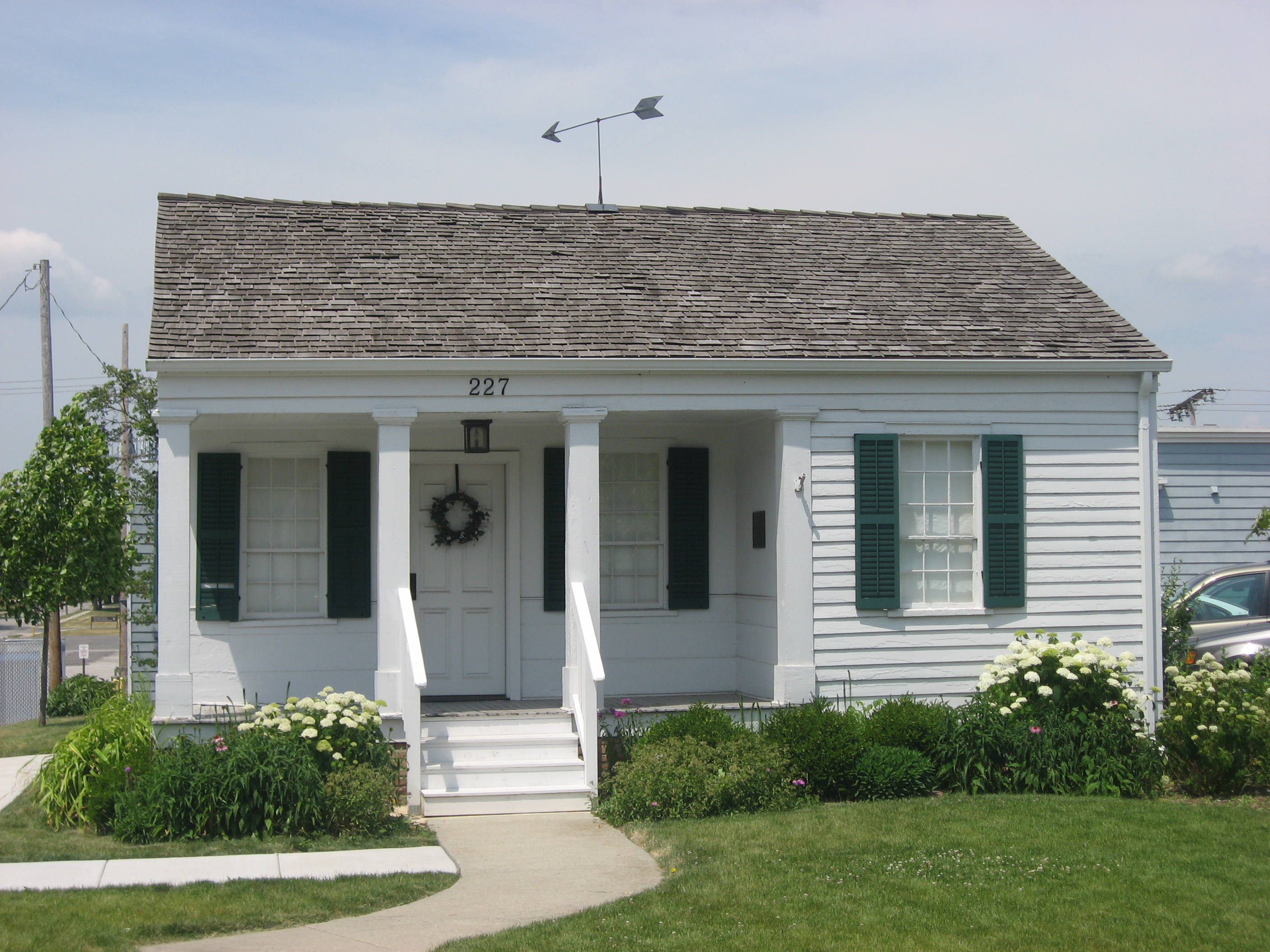
- Wellington A. Clark House, June 2012

- Location within Indiana Location within the United States
- Location: 227 S. Court St., Crown Point, Indiana
- Coordinates: 41°24′57″N 87°21′57″W
- Area: less than one acre
- Built: 1847
- Architectural style: Greek Revival, Hall and Parlor
- NRHP reference No.: 01000619
- Added to NRHP: June 6, 2001

Wellington A. Clark House, also known as The Old Homestead, is a historic home located at Crown Point, Indiana. It was built in 1847, and is a one-story, vernacular Greek Revival style timber frame dwelling with a hall and parlor plan. It has an L-shaped rear extension and is sheathed in clapboard siding. It was listed in the National Register of Historic Places in 2001.

Wellington A. Clark was a native New Yorker. In the winter of 1837, he traveled to northwest Indiana by way of ship from Cleveland to Chicago. After arriving in northern Indiana he settled on a farm south of Crown Point. In 1846, he and his wife, Mary C. Hackley, built “The Old Homestead”. Before finally settling into “The Old Homestead” full-time in 1875, they split their time between Crown Point and their farm in rural Lake County. During his life he pursued a number of different commercial ventures including farming, real estate and was a frequent contributor for the local newspaper. Notably, he opened the first cheese factory in Crown Point. He was a member of a couple fraternal organizations and was an active member of the Presbyterian church. As one of the original settlers in the area, he was one of the founding member of the Old Settlers and Historic Association. He remained in Crown Point till his death at 97 in 1912. As for “The Old Homestead”, it remained in family hands until his grand daughter, Claribel Clark Bevan died in 1965. Prior to her death Mrs. Bevan made arrangements to donate "The Old Homestead" to the city of Crown Point. In celebration of the State's sesquicentennial "The Old Homestead" was opened to the public for tours on May 4, 1966.
