= Lili Taylor =

American actress (born 1967)

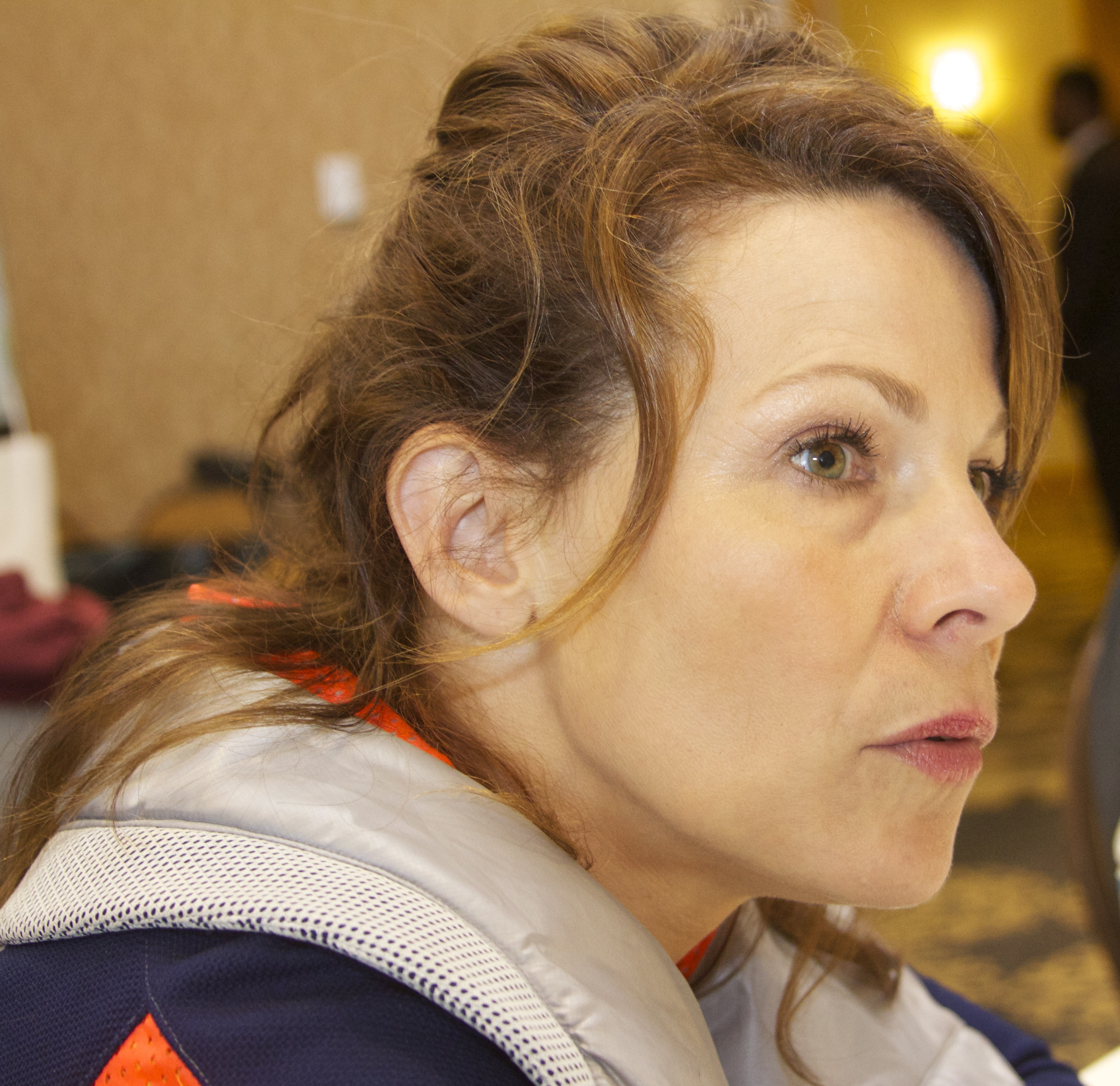
- Taylor in 2013
- Born: February 20, 1967 (age 59); Glencoe, Illinois, U.S.
- Education: DePaul University (attended)
- Occupation: Actress
- Years active: 1986–present
- Spouse: Nick Flynn (m. 2009)
- Children: 1

Lili Anne Taylor (born February 20, 1967) is an American actress. She came to prominence with supporting parts in the films Mystic Pizza (1988) and Say Anything... (1989), before establishing herself as one of the key figures of 1990s independent cinema through starring roles in Bright Angel (1990), Dogfight (1991), Household Saints, Short Cuts (both 1993), The Addiction (1995), I Shot Andy Warhol (1996), and Pecker (1998). Taylor is the recipient of four Independent Spirit nominations, winning once in the category of Best Supporting Female.

Alongside her work on smaller-scale projects, Taylor has encountered mainstream success with parts in films such as Born on the Fourth of July (1989), Rudy (1993), Ransom (1996), The Haunting (1999), High Fidelity (2000), Public Enemies (2009), The Conjuring (2013), and Maze Runner: The Scorch Trials (2015). Other credits include Factotum, The Notorious Bettie Page (both 2005), To the Bone (2017), and Paper Spiders (2020).

Outside film, Taylor has appeared in an array of television series. She was nominated for the Primetime Emmy for Outstanding Lead Actress for her portrayal of Anne Blaine on the ABC drama series American Crime (2015–2017). She received a further two Emmy nominations for her guest role as Marty Glenn in the X-Files episode "Mind's Eye" (1998) and her recurring portrayal of Lisa Kimmel on HBO's Six Feet Under (2002–2005). Taylor's stage credits include Broadway productions of Anton Chekhov's Three Sisters (1997) and Scott McPherson's Marvin's Room (2017).

== Early life ==
Taylor, the fifth of six children, was born in Glencoe, Illinois, a north suburb of Chicago, to an artist and hardware store operator. She grew up in a "warm family environment", and has described herself as being "a bit of a searcher" during her childhood. She graduated from New Trier High School in Winnetka, Illinois, in 1985. Thereafter, she attended The Theatre School at DePaul University before being cut from the acting program for a policy violation, and the Piven Theatre Workshop.

== Career ==
Much of Taylor's work has been in independent films and theater. She played supporting roles in Mystic Pizza (1988) and Say Anything... (1989). She starred in Dogfight (1991) directed by Nancy Savoca, in which she played an unattractive young woman who is taken to a cruel contest by a Marine (played by River Phoenix) under the pretense of a date; in his 1993 book Alternate Oscars, Danny Peary argued that Taylor deserved a Best Actress Academy Award for her performance in Dogfight.

In 1991, Taylor played Grace, the witty and romantic step-daughter of Faye Dunaway, in Arizona Dream (released 1993), directed by Emir Kusturica, co-starring Johnny Depp, Vincent Gallo and Jerry Lewis. In 1993, she re-teamed with Savoca for Household Saints. Director Robert Altman hired Taylor in 1993 for his epic Los Angeles drama Short Cuts, in which Taylor shared scenes with Lily Tomlin. The same year, she appeared in the film Rudy. In 1995, Taylor played the lead role in Abel Ferrera's The Addiction as a doctoral philosophy student who becomes a vampire. Taylor was nominated for an Independent Spirit Award for her performance.

Taylor portrayed Valerie Solanas, who attempted to assassinate Andy Warhol, in Mary Harron's I Shot Andy Warhol (1996). The same year, she co-starred in Girls Town with Bruklin Harris and Aunjanue Ellis, where three inner-city friends dealt with a friend's suicide, and later in Ransom, as caterer who helps her corrupt policeman boyfriend kidnap a rich man's son.

In 1998 she appeared in the X-Files episode "Mind's Eye", and was nominated for a Primetime Emmy Award for Outstanding Guest Actress in a Drama Series. The same year, she appeared in John Waters' film Pecker, alongside Edward Furlong, Christina Ricci and Mary Kay Place. In 1999, Taylor starred in Jan de Bont's remake of The Haunting. In 2001, Taylor appeared in the independent feature Julie Johnson. The film, co-starring Courtney Love, centered on a Long Island mother and housewife who leaves her husband to pursue her dream of studying science. She played Lisa Kimmel Fisher (mostly in the second and third seasons) in the HBO drama Six Feet Under for which she was nominated for an Emmy Award. In early 2004, Taylor made her New York City stage debut in Wallace Shawn's Aunt Dan and Lemon in the role of Lemon.

Taylor won the 2005 Best Actress award at the Copenhagen International Film Festival for her role in Factotum. In 2006, Taylor worked again with Mary Harron in The Notorious Bettie Page. She starred in the Lifetime cable network's hour-long comedy-drama series State of Mind, as a New Haven therapist dealing with a divorce and a parade of quirky clients. She played the daughter of Frank Langella's character in Andrew Wagner's 2007 drama Starting Out in the Evening. In the 2008 film The Promotion, Taylor played Lori Wehlner, the wife of John C. Reilly's character. In 2009, Taylor played Sheriff Lillian Holley of Lake County, Indiana, who incarcerates John Dillinger (played by Johnny Depp), in Michael Mann's Public Enemies. In 2011, Fence Books released Taylor's audio recording of poet Ariana Reines' Save The World. In 2013, Taylor starred in the horror hit The Conjuring.

In 2014, Taylor starred alongside Chloë Grace Moretz in the off-Broadway play The Library directed by Steven Soderbergh. The following year she co-starred in Maze Runner: The Scorch Trials, as Dr. Mary Cooper, "a doctor who helps Thomas and his fellow Gladers". Filming began at the end of October, and the movie was released on September 18, 2015. In 2020, Taylor starred opposite Stefania LaVie Owen in Paper Spiders.

Taylor will portray Mags in The Hunger Games: Sunrise on the Reaping set to be released in November 2026. Taylor also appeared in the second season of the Marvel Cinematic Universe television series Daredevil: Born Again as New York Governor Marge McCaffrey.

== Personal life ==
Taylor met actor Michael Imperioli on the set of I Shot Andy Warhol and the two had a brief romantic relationship.

In May 1997, Taylor's former boyfriend, actor Michael Rapaport, was arrested for harassing Taylor and charged with two counts of aggravated harassment. He pleaded guilty to the charges. New York Supreme Court Justice Arlene Goldberg issued a protection order forbidding him from contacting Taylor and requiring him to undergo counseling.

In 2009, Taylor married writer Nick Flynn. They have a daughter, who was born sometime around 2008.

Taylor is an activist for conservation issues, particularly those having to do with birds, and sits on the boards of the American Birding Association and National Audubon Society. She wrote a book of essays, Turning to Birds, The Power and Beauty of Noticing, published in 2025.

Taylor introduced Louise Post to Nina Gordon, and they went on to found the 1990s alternative band Veruca Salt in the early 1990s.

== Awards ==
Taylor is a three-time Primetime Emmy Award nominee. Also recognized for her extensive work in American independent film, she has been nominated for four Independent Spirit Awards, winning Best Supporting Female for her performance in Household Saints (1993). She was nominated for Best Female Lead for Bright Angel (1990) and The Addiction (1995), and again for Best Supporting Female for Girls Town (1996). In 1996, she received a Special Recognition award from the Sundance Film Festival for her performance in Mary Harron's I Shot Andy Warhol, in which she portrayed Valerie Solanas. Ten years later, in 2006, she was honored with the Excellence in Acting Award at the Provincetown International Film Festival.

== Filmography ==
=== Film ===
Key
†	Denotes films that have not yet been released

Year	Title	Role	Notes
1988	She's Having a Baby	Lab Technician O. Palmer	
1988	Mystic Pizza	Josephina "Jojo" Barbosa	
1989	Say Anything...	Corey Flood	
1989	Born on the Fourth of July	Jamie Wilson – Georgia	
1990	Bright Angel	Lucy	Nominated—Independent Spirit Award for Best Female Lead
1991	Dogfight	Rose	
1993	Arizona Dream	Grace Stalker	
1993	Watch It	Brenda	
1993	Short Cuts	Honey Bush	Golden Globe Special Ensemble Cast Award (non-competitive); Volpi Cup for Best Ensemble Cast
1993	Household Saints	Teresa Carmela Santangelo	Independent Spirit Award for Best Supporting Female
1993	Rudy	Sherry	
1994	Touch Base	Darcy Winningham	Short film
1994	Mrs. Parker and the Vicious Circle	Edna Ferber	
1994	Prêt-à-Porter	Fiona Ulrich	National Board of Review for Best Acting by an Ensemble
1995	The Addiction	Kathleen Conklin	Málaga International Week of Fantastic Cinema: Best Actress; Sant Jordi Award for Best Foreign Actress; Nominated—Independent Spirit Award for Best Female Lead
1995	Cold Fever	Jill	Seattle International Film Festival: Best Actress (also for I Shot Andy Warhol and Girls Town)
1995	Four Rooms	Raven	Segment: "The Missing Ingredient"
1995	Killer: A Journal of a Murder	Woman In Speakeasy (uncredited)	
1996	Plain Pleasures	Unknown	Short film
1996	Girls Town	Patti Lucci	Seattle International Film Festival: Best Actress (also for I Shot Andy Warhol and Cold Fever); Nominated—Independent Spirit Award for Best Supporting Female
1996	I Shot Andy Warhol	Valerie Solanas	Seattle International Film Festival: Best Actress (also for Girls Town and Cold Fever); Stockholm International Film Festival: Best Actress; Sundance Film Festival: Special Recognition; Nominated—Chicago Film Critics Association Award for Best Actress; Nominated—National Society of Film Critics Award for Best Actress (3rd place)
1996	Cosas que nunca te dije	Ann	Thessaloniki International Film Festival: Best Actress
1996	Illtown	Micky	
1996	Ransom	Maris Conner	Blockbuster Entertainment Award for Favorite Supporting Actress—Suspense
1997	Kicked in the Head	'Happy'	
1998	OK Garage	Rachel	
1998	The Impostors	Lily 'Lil'	
1998	Come to	Angela	Short film
1998	Pecker	Rorey Wheeler	
1999	A Slipping-Down Life	Evie Decker	Indianapolis International Film Festival: Special Jury Prize (shared with Sara Rue); Newport Beach Film Festival: Outstanding Achievement in Acting
1999	The Haunting	Nell Vance	Nominated—Blockbuster Entertainment Award for Favorite Supporting Actress – Horror; Nominated—Golden Raspberry Award for Worst Screen Couple (with Catherine Zeta-Jones)
2000	High Fidelity	Sarah Kendrew	
2001	Julie Johnson	Julie Johnson	
2001	Gaudi Afternoon	Ben	
2003	Casa de los Babys	Leslie	
2005	Factotum	Jan	Copenhagen International Film Festival: Best Actress; San Diego Film Critics Society Award for Best Supporting Actress; Nominated—St. Louis Gateway Film Critics Association Award for Best Supporting Actress
2005	The Notorious Bettie Page	Paula Klaw	
2007	Starting Out in the Evening	Ariel Schiller	
2007	The Secret	Hannah Marris	
2008	The Promotion	Lori Wehlner	
2009	Tired of Being Funny	Lee	Short film
2009	Brooklyn's Finest	Angela Procida	Nominated—Black Reel Award for Best Ensemble
2009	Public Enemies	Sheriff Lillian Holley	
2011	The Pier	Grace Ross	
2012	About Cherry	Phyllis	
2012	Being Flynn	Joy	
2012	The Courier	Mrs. Capo	
2012	Future Weather	Ms. Markovi	
2013	The Cold Lands	Nicole	
2013	The Conjuring	Carolyn Perron	Fangoria Chainsaw Award for Best Supporting Actress; Fright Meter Award for Best Actress in a Supporting Role
2013	Blood Ties	Marie Pierzynski	
2015	Maze Runner: The Scorch Trials	Dr. Mary Cooper	
2015	A Woman Like Me	Anna Seashell	
2017	To the Bone	Judy	
2017	Leatherface	Verna Sawyer-Carson	
2018	The Nun	Carolyn Perron	Cameo
2019	Eli	Dr. Isabella Horn	
2020	The Evening Hour	Ruby Freeman	
2020	Paper Spiders	Dawn	
2021	The Winter House	Eileen	
2022	Yield	Celia	Short film
2022	There There	One Night Stand	
2025	Fear Street: Prom Queen	VP Dolores Brekenridge	
2025	The Gettysburg Address	Emily Souder (voice)	
2025	The Conjuring: Last Rites	Carolyn Perron	Cameo
2026	Anima	Julia	
2026	Freaks Part II	Erica Lang	
2026	The Hunger Games: Sunrise on the Reaping	Mags Flanagan	
TBA	The Bell Jar †	Jay Cee	Post-production
TBA	Preppy †		Filming

=== Television ===
Year	Title	Role	Notes
1986	Crime Story	Waitress	Episode: "Hide and Go Thief"
1987	Night of Courage	Marina	Television film
1990	Monsters	Jamie Neal	Episode: "Habitat"
1990	American Playhouse	Younger Marianne	Episode: "Sensibility and Sense"
1990	Family of Spies	Laura Walker	Television film
1997	SUBWAYStories: Tales from the Underground	Belinda	Television film
1997–1998	Mad About You	Arley	2 episodes
1998	The X-Files	Marty Glenn	Episode: "Mind's Eye"; Nominated—Primetime Emmy Award for Outstanding Guest Actress in a Drama Series
2000–2001	Deadline	Hildy Baker	Main role; 13 episodes
2001	Anne Frank: The Whole Story	Miep Gies	Main role; 2 episodes
2002	Live from Baghdad	Judy Parker	Television film
2002–2005	Six Feet Under	Lisa Kimmel Fisher	Recurring role; 25 episodes Screen Actors Guild Award for Outstanding Performance by an Ensemble in a Drama Series; Nominated—Primetime Emmy Award for Outstanding Guest Actress in a Drama Series (2002)
2003	Penguins Behind Bars	Doris Fairfeather (voice)	Television film
2007	State of Mind	Ann Bellows, M.D.	Main role; 8 episodes
2010	The Good Wife	Donna Seabrook	Episode: "Poisoned Pill"
2013–2014	Hemlock Grove	Lynda Rumancek	Recurring role; 11 episodes
2013–2014	Almost Human	Captain Sandra Maldonado	Main role; 13 episodes
2014	Gotham	Patti	Episode: "Selina Kyle"
2015	Law & Order: Special Victims Unit	Martha Thornhill	2 episodes
2015–2017	American Crime	Nancy Straumberg / Anne Blaine / Claire Coates	Main role; 21 episodes Nominated—Primetime Emmy Award for Outstanding Lead Actress in a Limited Series or Movie; Nominated—Critics' Choice Television Award for Best Actress in a Movie/Limited Series
2019	Chambers	Ruth Pezim	Recurring role; 7 episodes
2020	Perry Mason	Birdy McKeegan	Recurring role; 7 episodes
2022–2024	Outer Range	Cecilia Abbott	Main role; 14 episodes
2024	Manhunt	Mary Todd Lincoln	Recurring role; 4 episodes
2025	Poker Face	FBI Agent Darville	2 episodes
2026	Daredevil: Born Again	Governor Marge McCaffrey	Main role; 5 episodes

== Stage credits ==
Year	Title	Role	Notes
1997	Three Sisters	Irina	Roundabout Theatre Company, New York
2001	The Dead Eye Boy	Shirley-Diane	MCC Theater, New York
2006	Landscape of the Body	Betty	Off-Broadway, Peter Norton Space, New York
2009	Mourning Becomes Electra	Christine Mannon	Off-Broadway, Acorn Theatre, New York
2014	The Library	Dawn Sheridan	Off-Broadway, Public Theater, New York
2017	Marvin's Room	Bessie Wakefield	Broadway, American Airlines Theatre
