= Mind's Eye (The X-Files) =

- The X-Files episode
- Episode no.: Season 5 Episode 16
- Directed by: Kim Manners
- Written by: Tim Minear
- Production code: 5X16
- Original air date: April 19, 1998
- Running time: 45 minutes

Guest appearances
- Lili Taylor as Marty Glenn; Blu Mankuma as Detective Pennock; Richard Fitzpatrick as Charles Wesley Gotts; Henri Lubatti as Dr. Wilkenson; Peter Kelamis as ADA Costa

Episode chronology
← Previous "Travelers"	Next → "All Souls"
- The X-Files season 5

"Mind's Eye" is the sixteenth episode of the fifth season of the American science fiction television series The X-Files. The episode first aired in the United States on April 19, 1998 on the Fox network. It was written by Tim Minear and directed by Kim Manners. The episode is a "Monster-of-the-Week" story, a stand-alone plot which is unconnected to the series' wider mythology. "Mind's Eye" received a Nielsen household rating of 10.4 and was watched by 16.53 million viewers. The episode received moderately positive reviews, with many critics praising Lili Taylor's performance as Glenn. Taylor was nominated for a Primetime Emmy award in the category of Outstanding Guest Actress in a Drama Series.

The show centers on FBI special agents Fox Mulder (David Duchovny) and Dana Scully (Gillian Anderson) who work on cases linked to the paranormal, called X-Files. In this episode, Mulder and Scully investigate a murder that seems to have been committed by a blind woman, Marty Glenn (Lili Taylor), but Mulder suspects that she is capable of seeing images in some other way. Eventually, it is revealed that Glenn, while blind, can see the actions of her murderous father via her mind's eye.

"Mind's Eye" was inspired by the concept of "remote viewing", or being able to see events beyond the range of normal vision. Minear sought to make Glenn the opposite of Audrey Hepburn's character in the 1967 film Wait Until Dark, in which Hepburn played the part of an innocent but terrorized blind woman. Taylor, an actress who at this point was known primarily for her work in independent films, appeared in the episode after requesting a part.

== Plot ==
In Wilmington, Delaware, a blind woman named Marty Glenn (Lili Taylor) is in her apartment when she suddenly experiences a vision of someone with a knife approaching a man standing in a bathroom. Later, the police are called to a motel, where they find the man in Marty’s vision dead in the bathroom of one of the rooms; the police also discover Marty hiding in the shower. Assuming she is the murderer, the police go to arrest her but quickly realize that she is blind. Not sure of how a blind woman could commit the crime, Detective Lloyd Pennock (Blu Mankuma) contacts Fox Mulder (David Duchovny) and Dana Scully (Gillian Anderson). Pennock believes that Marty possesses a "sixth sense" that allowed her to kill. Marty comes under further suspicion when she says things only the guilty party should know under questioning. Mulder becomes convinced that Marty somehow observed the murder, despite her disability. Meanwhile, Scully discovers a leather glove hidden behind an old razor disposal bin at the crime scene.

Suddenly, Marty experiences another vision: the murderer approaches a woman, Susan Forester, at a bar. Marty is able to see the name of the bar in her vision, so when her premonition ends, she asks to make a phone call to the bar; there, she warns a man named Gotts (Richard Fitzpatrick) to leave Forester alone. Later, Scully shows the glove to Marty, who informs her that her fingerprints were found on it and that it fits her. Pennock concludes that the evidence is enough to charge Marty, but Mulder still does not think she is guilty. After Scully raises the possibility that Marty may not be blind, an eye examination is undertaken, during which Marty experiences another vision. During this event, Mulder notes that the device used to measure Marty's eyesight has a reaction. While the examiner believes Marty to truly be blind, Mulder believes that she might be reacting to visions in her mind's eye.

With insufficient evidence to charge her, Marty is released. Making her way home, she once again has a vision, this time of Gotts attacking Forester. Marty is too late to save Forester, and so she returns to the police station, confessing to the murders. Mulder—convinced that Marty is innocent—talks to Marty about her mother's murder. It is revealed that Gotts is actually Marty's father, and he killed her mother when she was still in the womb. Mulder tells Marty that he believes she was given her ability to "see" visions in her mind's eye. It is also revealed that Gotts had spent thirty years (Marty’s whole life) in prison until being recently paroled. Marty reveals Gotts’ last known location, while Pennock takes her back to her apartment to pick up some things before entering protective custody. While packing, Marty has a vision of Gotts in the lobby of her apartment; she knocks Pennock out, takes his gun and waits for Gotts to find her. Mulder figures out that Marty had been experiencing Gotts' sight for the thirty years he was in prison, which effectively meant she too had spent her whole life in prison. The agents arrive at Marty's apartment only to find that Marty has killed Gotts. She is sent to prison but is finally freed from her father.

== Production ==
=== Writing ===
"Mind's Eye" was written by Tim Minear—his second credit for the series—and directed by Kim Manners. Minear was inspired to write the episode after learning about "remote viewing": the parapsychological practice of seeking impressions about a distant or unseen target, purportedly using extrasensory perception (ESP) or "sensing" with the mind. Reportedly, the Central Intelligence Agency spent $20 million on "Stargate Project", which was a research project to determine if the ability exists.

Minear initially had trouble conceptualizing his idea, noting, "It might be a good idea for a short story, but how do you make the whole thing work visually?" To combat this issue, Minear decided to make the remote viewer blind. He sought to make the blind woman "not Audrey Hepburn", a reference to the 1967 film Wait Until Dark, in which Hepburn played the part of an innocent but terrorized blind woman. He later said, "I wanted to make [Glenn] a bitch, because the fact is that disability doesn't necessarily ennoble a person."

=== Casting and filming ===
"Mind's Eye" guest-starred Lili Taylor, an actress who at the time was known for largely working in the independent film scene. Taylor, a fan of the series, appeared in the episode after asking the show's casting director, Rick Milikan, if they were interested in working with her. Blu Mankuma, who played the part of Detective Pennock, had previously appeared in the first season episode "Ghost in the Machine". Mulder's line "even if the gloves do fit – you can still acquit", a reference to the leather gloves of the O. J. Simpson murder case, was improvised by Duchovny during filming.

During the filming of the episode, art director Greg Loewen got into a discussion with the lighting department when he pointed out that Glenn, being blind, had no need for lamps and other lights. The department quipped back: "Although The X-Files [i]s a dark show, it [i]sn't that dark." The "staccato" and "nightmarish" remote visions that Glenn experiences were created in post-production by visual effects supervisor Laurie Kallsen-George.

== Broadcast and reception ==
"Mind's Eye" premiered on the Fox network in the United States on April 19, 1998. It earned a Nielsen household rating of 10.4, with a 16 share, meaning that roughly 10.4 percent of all television-equipped households, and 16 percent of households watching television, were tuned in to the episode. It was viewed by 16.53 million viewers. "Mind's Eye" also was nominated for several Emmy Awards. Taylor was nominated for an award in the category of Outstanding Guest Actress in a Drama Series—a nomination shared by fellow X-Files guest star Veronica Cartwright—although Cloris Leachman won. Editor Casey O Rohrs was nominated for Outstanding Single-Camera Picture Editing.

The episode received moderately positive reviews from television critics, with many praising Taylor's performance as Glenn. Zack Handlen from The A.V. Club gave the episode a moderately positive review and awarded it a B+. He was slightly critical that Glenn's ability to see visions was not sufficiently expanded upon; he ultimately called Mulder's explanation "crap". However, Handlen praised guest star Taylor and Duchovny, noting that "Taylor is convincing in the role, and Duchovny does a good job making his lines sound more logical than they actually are." He ultimately concluded that the entry is "not a bad episode, exactly" but that "it's far from a great one."

Paula Vitaris from Cinefantastique gave the episode a moderately positive review and awarded it two-and-a-half stars out of four. Vitaris drew comparisons between the installment and the third season episode "Oubliette". " She did praise Taylor's performance, writing "it is [Taylor] who makes 'Mind's Eye' truly memorable." Robert Shearman and Lars Pearson, in their book Wanting to Believe: A Critical Guide to The X-Files, Millennium & The Lone Gunmen, rated the episode three stars out of five. The two called the entry "solid, if unspectacular", noting that, once the premise is developed, "there's really not much depth to be mined from it." Shearman and Pearson, however, concluded that "the episode works nonetheless, thanks to a superb central performance from Lili Taylor [who] gives the best guest star turn of the year, lending a strength, an anger, and a redeeming humour to a blind woman who has adapted the world to her disability."

== Bibliography ==
- Hurwitz, Matt & Knowles, Chris (2008). The Complete X-Files: Behind the Series the Myths and the Movies. New York, US: Insight Editions. ISBN 978-1933784724.
- Meisler, Andy (1999), Resist or Serve: The Official Guide to The X-Files, Vol. 4, London: HarperCollins, ISBN 0-00-257133-1
- Shearman, Robert; Pearson, Lars (2009). Wanting to Believe: A Critical Guide to The X-Files, Millennium & The Lone Gunmen. Mad Norwegian Press. ISBN 978-0975944691.
