= William Whitaker Landscape and House =

Historic house in Indiana, United States

- U.S. National Register of Historic Places
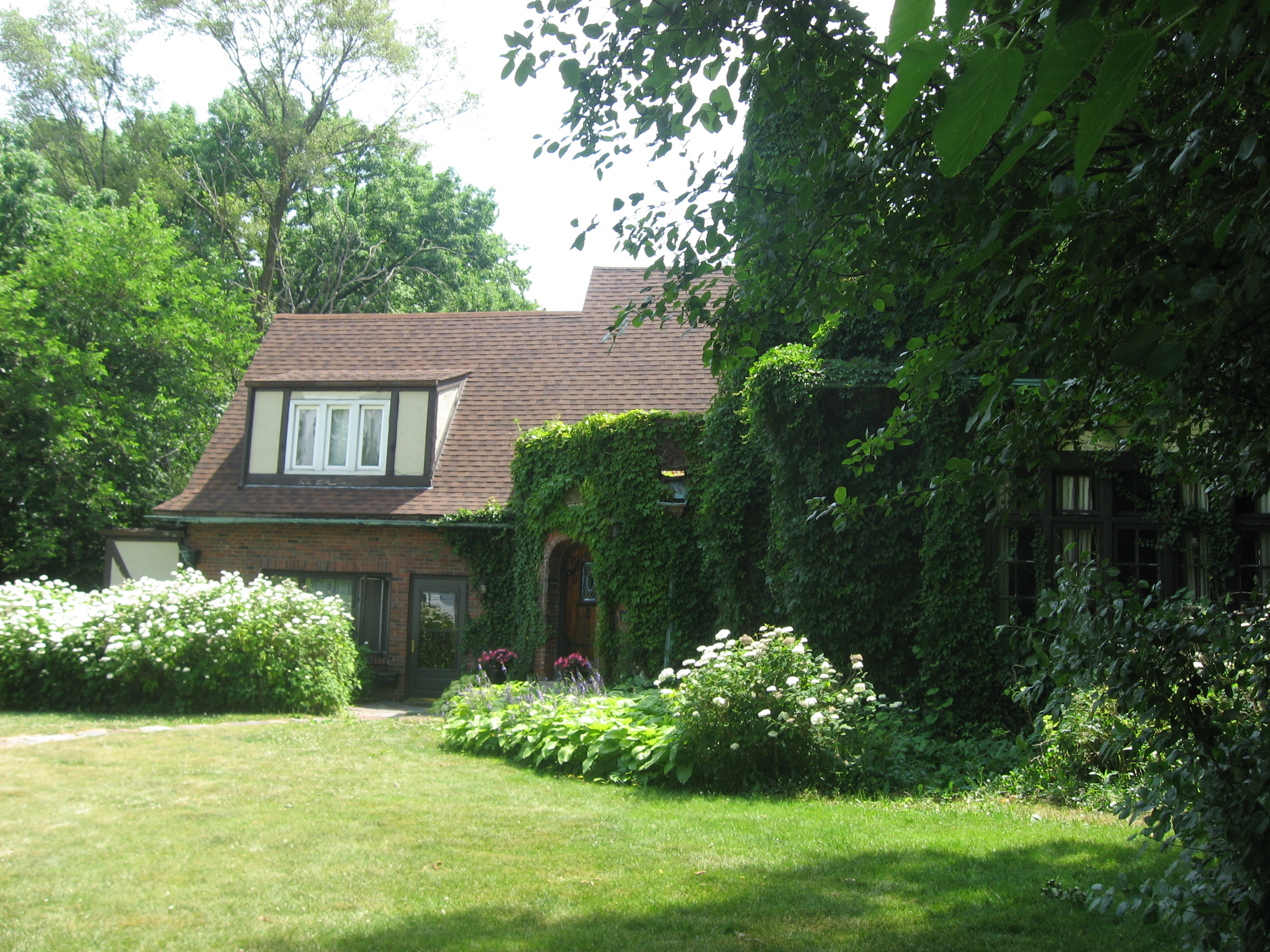
- William Whitaker House, June 2012

- Location within Indiana Location within the United States
- Location: 472 S. Main, Crown Point, Indiana
- Coordinates: 41°24′36″N 87°21′50″W
- Area: less than one acre
- Built: 1926, 1929
- Architect: Jensen, Jens; Hess & Greenwood
- Architectural style: Prairie School, Tudor Revival
- NRHP reference No.: 99001107
- Added to NRHP: September 9, 1999

William Whitaker Landscape and House is a historic home and garden located at Crown Point, Indiana. The house was built in 1926, and is a two-story, L-shaped, Tudor Revival style brick dwelling. It has a steeply pitched cross-gable roof with cross-timbering on the gable ends. A two-story addition was built in 1967. The landscape was designed in the Prairie School style by Jens Jensen and built in 1929.

It was listed in the National Register of Historic Places in 1999.
