= Reno: Rebel without a Pause =

- Directed by: Nancy Savoca
- Written by: Reno
- Starring: Reno
- Release date: 2002
- Running time: 75 minutes
- Country: United States

Reno: Rebel without a Pause is a 2002 comedy concert film directed by Nancy Savoca.

== Overview ==
A filmed performance of the stage act, Reno: Rebel Without a Pause, starring stand-up comedian Reno. "With a stage presence that suggests a combination of Richard Lewis, Ethel Merman, and a raving derelict, stream-of-consciousness comedian Reno paces the stage like a street-corner prophet, belting out breathless sociopolitical monologues to anyone within shouting range," stated AV Club critic Scott Tobias.

"Instantly identifiable as a New Yorker in her pugnacious manner and adenoidal tone," he adds, "Reno witnessed the fall of the [World Trade Center] towers from her nearby Manhattan apartment building, and her memories vividly recapture the day's surreal quality. Though the sound of the first plane crashing jostled her from a deep slumber, the habitual night owl recalls falling back asleep until friends called her answering machine, pleading for her to get up, all reflexively apologizing for ringing before 1 p.m. She talks about the weird sensation of watching the towers burning outside and on network news simultaneously, a rumor about terrorists with machetes walled up in a local bistro, and a telephone conversation in which her mother, reassured of her immediate health, asks 'What else is new?'"

== Critical reception ==
Stephen Holden of The New York Times wrote "If Reno is to the left of liberal on the political spectrum, her tough, funny, rather chaotic show isn't subversive so much as it is nit-picky about the hypocrisies of our time."
