= Lake County Tuberculosis Sanatorium, Nurses Home and Superintendent's House =

- U.S. National Register of Historic Places
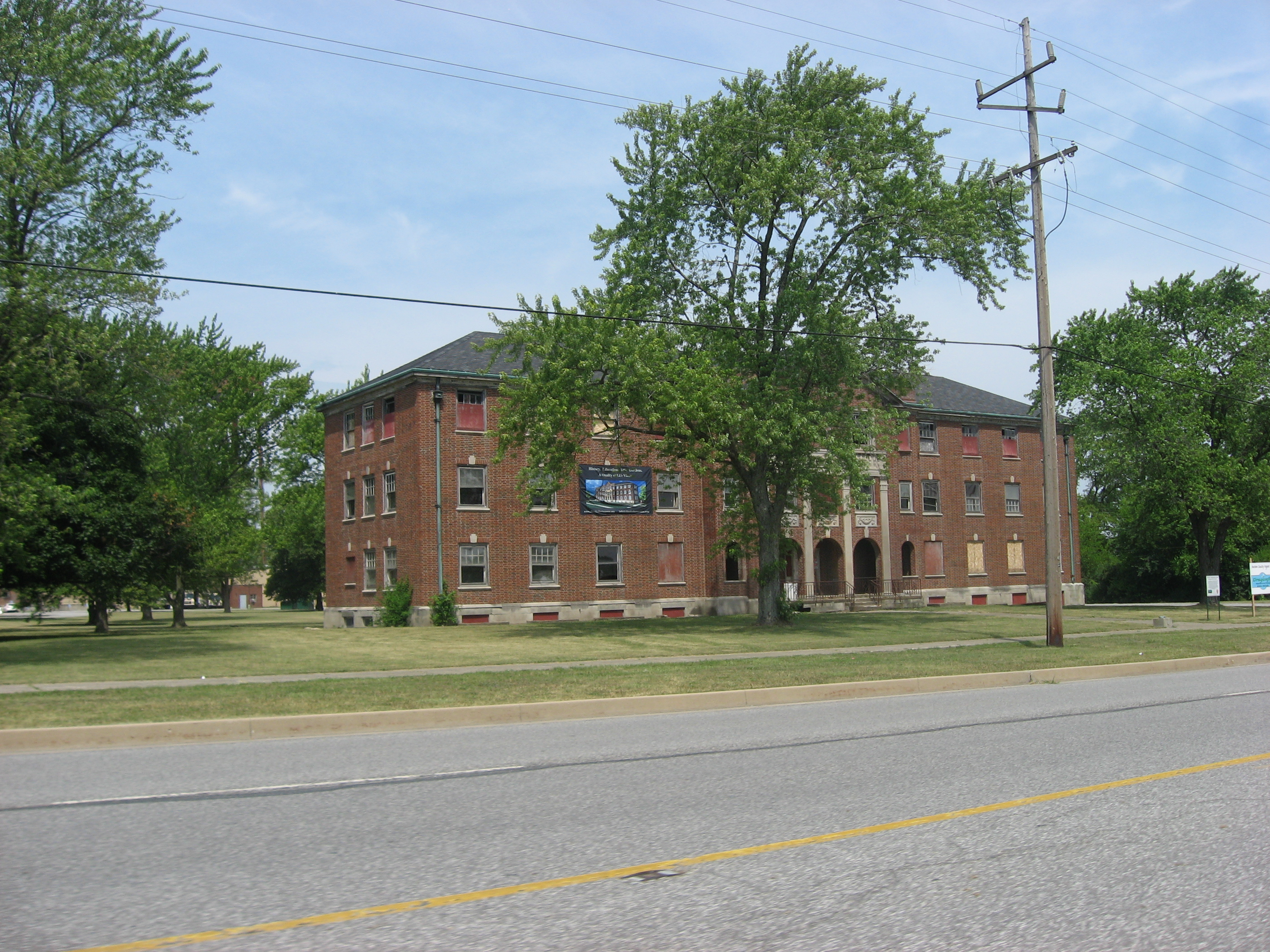
- Lake County Sanatorium Nurses Home, June 2012

- Location within Indiana Location within the United States
- Location: 2323 N. Main St. and 425 W. 93rd Ave., Crown Point, Indiana
- Coordinates: 41°27′4″N 87°21′55″W
- Area: 2.86 acres (1.16 ha)
- Built: 1930
- Architect: Norris, Karl D.
- Architectural style: Georgian Revival, Colonial Revival
- NRHP reference No.: 05000608, 12001150 (Boundary Increase)
- Added to NRHP: June 17, 2005, January 9, 2013 (Boundary Increase)

Lake County Tuberculosis Sanatorium, Nurses Home and Superintendent's House is a historic tuberculosis sanatorium located at Crown Point, Indiana. The Nurses Home was built in 1930, and is a three-story, Georgian Revival style brick building on a raised concrete basement. It has a hipped roof with pediment. It features a three-bay projecting entrance portico with an arcade and variation of Corinthian order pilasters. The Superintendent's House was built in 1930, and is a 2 1/2-story, Colonial Revival style brick building with a one-story flat roofed wing. The Lake County Tuberculosis Sanatorium closed around 1971.

It was added to the National Register of Historic Places in 2005, with a boundary increase in 2013.
