= The 24 Hour Woman =

1999 film by Nancy Savoca

- Film poster
- Directed by: Nancy Savoca
- Written by: Nancy Savoca; Richard Guay
- Produced by: Larry Meistrich
- Starring: Rosie Perez; Marianne Jean-Baptiste; Patti LuPone; Karen Duffy; Diego Serrano; Wendell Pierce
- Cinematography: Teresa Medina
- Edited by: Camilla Toniolo
- Production company: The Shooting Gallery
- Distributed by: Artisan Entertainment
- Release dates: January 22, 1999 (Sundance); January 29, 1999 (United States)
- Running time: 93 minutes
- Country: United States
- Language: English
- Box office: $109,535 (US)

The 24 Hour Woman is a 1999 comedy film directed and co-written by Nancy Savoca. It stars Rosie Perez, Marianne Jean-Baptiste, Patti LuPone, Karen Duffy, Diego Serrano, and Wendell Pierce. The film is about a woman who struggles to be both a successful television producer and a new mother. The film premiered at the 1999 Sundance Film Festival and had a limited theatrical release on January 29, 1999.

== Plot ==
Grace Santos is a producer for a New York City daytime talk show called The 24 Hour Woman. She is expecting a baby with her husband, Eddie, the show's co-host. When her pregnancy is leaked to Eddie on air, Grace's boss Joan turns it into the subject of the talk show in order to drum up ratings. Madeline, a mother of three who is married to Roy, interviews for a job at the show, seeking a return to work after time away raising her family. Although she is overqualified for the position, Grace hires her as her assistant when Madeline says she is eager to start anywhere. The unemployed Roy becomes a stay-at-home dad, which he has some difficulties adjusting to and is shamed by his peers for.

The show ratings become successful and help the show move from cable to a network. After Grace gives birth to baby Lily, she finds it difficult to juggle new motherhood and the demands of her job. Eddie struggles to share parenting duties and is often away filming movies for his burgeoning acting career. Joan has Grace return to work immediately. The couple hires a nanny, Cheryl, but Grace misses Lily when she is at work.

On Lily's first birthday, Eddie is in Los Angeles filming an action movie, so his mother and mother-in-law are helping with party festivities. At work, Grace is tasked with securing an interview with author Dr. Suzanne Pincus, but hopes to make it home in time for the party. However, she has difficulty talking with Suzanne's publicist on the phone, so she is forced to go to Suzanne's book signing to speak to her in person and convince her to come on the show. After securing the interview, Grace has to buy a present for Lily at Herald Square. As the store is sold out of the toy that Grace needs, she buys the one on display for $300 and tries to rush home during the Christmas holiday traffic. When her subway fare is rejected, she tries to sneak under the turnstile, prompting an argument with a police officer that culminates in her arrest. She manages to come home, but has already missed the party. Grace's mother and mother-in-law play video from the party, and Grace feels ashamed that she missed her daughter taking her first steps. The following day, Grace tries to recreate footage from the birthday on video to make it appear as if she made it home in time.

Grace finds herself wanting to spend more time with Lily than going to work. When Eddie finds out that she relieved Cheryl, they have a big argument about her work load, Eddie's job, and the division of parenting duties. Grace decides to quit her job and goes to the office, where everyone is dressed in drag as part of a Sex Switcheroo-themed day. She goes to Joan to say she's quitting, and Joan is unsympathetic towards Grace's situation. Grace accuses Joan of devaluing her work on the show and storms out. While trying to clean out her office, Grace sees Eddie talking on air about Lily and lying about what a supportive father he's been, which infuriates her. She finds a Luger that was left in her drawer from a news segment and angrily confronts Eddie with it live on air. Eddie manages to calm Grace down and she puts the gun down, just as police burst in and arrest her.

As Grace is led away by police, she tells Eddie "I wish I never met you." Meanwhile, the incident has become a media sensation. Later, Eddie goes to Grace's apartment and apologizes for not being more helpful. Grace says she didn't mean what she said about meeting him because their relationship gave her a lot of nice things, including Lily. As Eddie babysits Lily one day, Grace goes to pitch a new talk show that will be about the "little everyday stuff that drives us crazy." An executive jokingly suggests to "give her a shot" and her pitch is accepted. Grace boards a taxi and is joined by Madeline, who will be joining her new show.

== Cast ==
- Rosie Perez as Grace Santos
- Marianne Jean-Baptiste as Madeline Labelle
- Patti LuPone as Joan Marshall
- Karen Duffy as Margo Lynn
- Diego Serrano as Eddie Diaz
- Melissa Leo as Dr. Suzanne Pincus
- Wendell Pierce as Roy Labelle
- Aida Turturro as Brenda
- Rosanna DeSoto as Linda
- Chris Cooper as Ron Hacksby
- Kristin Sentman as Cheryl
- Cari Gorostiza as Abuela
- Jerry Springer as himself

== Release ==
The film premiered at the Sundance Film Festival on January 22, 1999. On January 29 a week later, it was the opening feature for the series "The Feminine Eye: Twenty Years of Women's Cinema" at the Brooklyn Academy of Music. The series included films such as Sally Potter's Orlando, Julie Dash's Daughters of the Dust, Euzhan Palcy's Sugar Cane Alley, Jane Campion's Sweetie, Claire Denis's Chocolat, Agnieszka Holland's Angry Harvest, and Barbara Kopple's American Dream.

== Critical reception ==
Roger Ebert of the Chicago Sun-Times enjoyed the film, awarding it 3 out of 4 stars. He wrote, "The 24 Hour Woman is a message picture wrapped inside a screwball comedy, with a touch of satire aimed at TV talk shows. It doesn't all work, but it happens so fast we don't get stuck in the awkward parts. Rosie Perez's Grace is the engine that pulls the story, with so much energy she seems to vibrate. Some will see her character as exaggerated. Not me. She's half Brooklynite-half TV producer, and from what I've seen of both species, hyperactivity is built in."

Marjorie Baumgarten of The Austin Chronicle also gave a mostly positive review. She wrote, "Too much of The 24 Hour Woman is constructed in [a] paradigmatic manner; too often it smacks of having points to make rather than the urgency of a story to tell. Yet observations of such things as Grace hooked up to a breast pump or a woman's comment that she enjoyed work because at least 'no one threw food around' lend the film a reality that's hard to mistake." Though she said the film "is too obvious and too inconclusive to be considered Savoca's best work…[it] goes places that few movies even dare to reach".

The Film Journal's Kevin Lally wrote "The 24 Hour Woman is a movie of modest ambitions, but it does reflect a very real dilemma in this era where worth, for both sexes, is often measured by career achievement. Savoca and producer husband Richard Guay's script never strays from the theme of job vs. children, so it feels more like a high-concept sitcom than a movie. Fortunately, it has something special in Rosie Perez, who brings a terrific raw energy to the assignment and has never been more appealing." Merle Bertrand wrote in Film Threat that "Perez, equal parts spitfire and cuddly kitten, is dynamite as Grace while the soothing, almost motherly Jean-Baptiste is her perfect foil."

The film's satirization of daytime TV and talk shows was lauded by Ebert, Lally, and Dennis Harvey of Variety, though critics also said the film times veers too much into a sitcom-like tone. Janet Maslin of The New York Times said, "What's best about The 24-Hour Woman is its refusal, most of the time, to buy into Hollywood's usual happily-ever-after solutions to this very contemporary dilemma", and "to the film's credit it has no easy answers about such mixed feeling [on parenthood]". However, she criticized the ending as too neatly resolved and said the film's "use of supporting characters as straw men and women also robs the story of life". She concluded, "In leaping from the real world to an idealized one, The 24-Hour Woman loses track of its most important thought about mixing work and parenthood. It's not this easy."

On review aggregator website Rotten Tomatoes, The 24 Hour Woman has an approval score of 50% based on 16 critics' reviews, with an average rating of 5.6/10.

== Accolades ==
At the 2000 ALMA Awards, Rosie Perez was nominated for Outstanding Film Actress and Nancy Savoca was nominated for Outstanding Film Director. At the 2000 Black Reel Awards, Perez was nominated for Best Actress in a Film.
