= Walter Allman House =

Historic house in Indiana, United States

- U.S. National Register of Historic Places
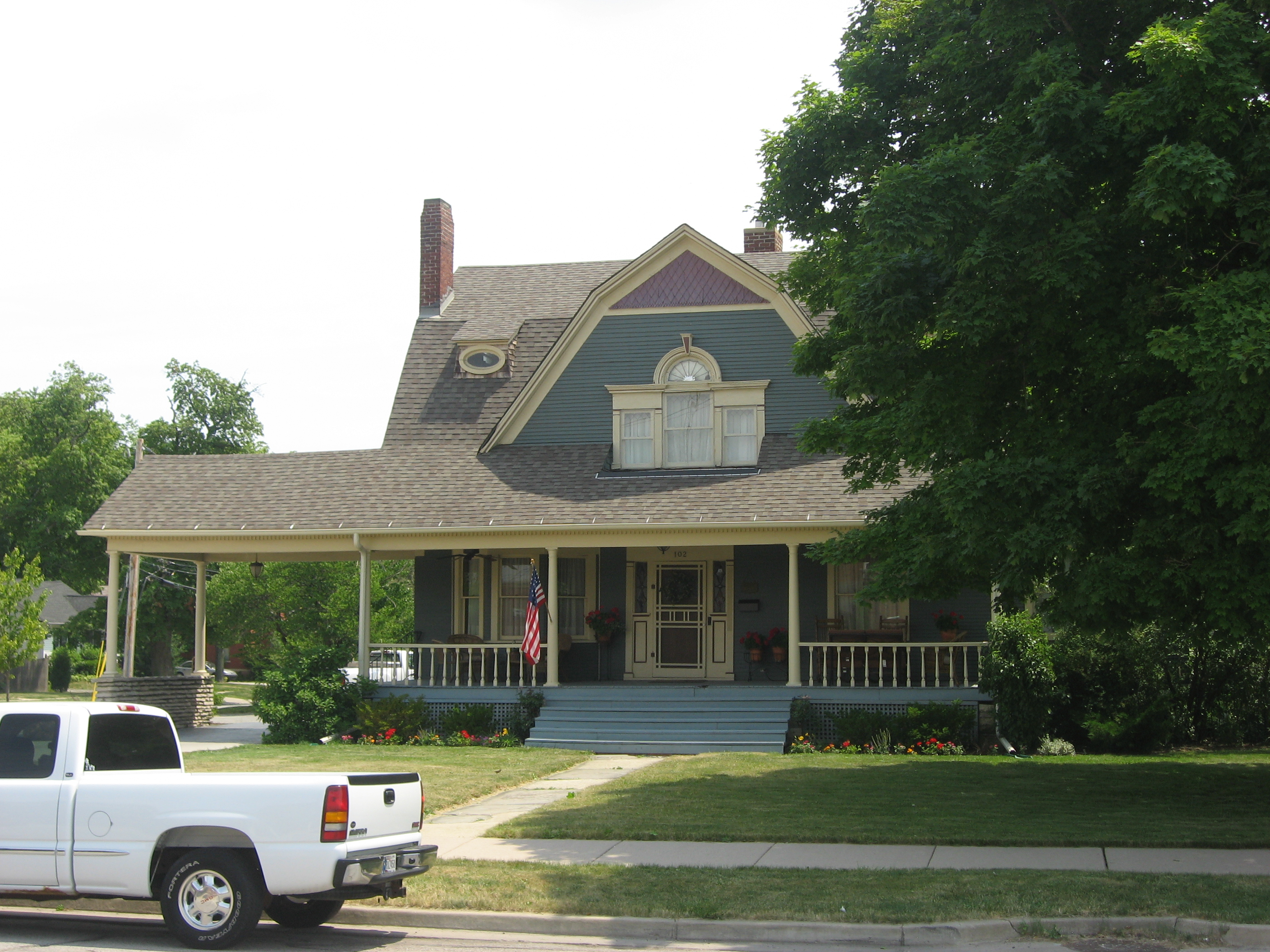
- Walter Allman House, June 2012

- Location within Indiana Location within the United States
- Location: 102 S. East St., Crown Point, Indiana
- Coordinates: 41°25′04″N 87°21′43″W
- Area: Less than 1 acre (0.40 ha)
- Built: 1902
- Architect: Lambert, William
- Architectural style: Shingle style
- NRHP reference No.: 10001077
- Added to NRHP: December 27, 2010

Walter Allman House is a historic home located at Crown Point, Indiana. It was built in 1902, and is a three-story, Shingle style frame dwelling sheathed in horizontal clapboard shingles. It sits on a limestone foundation and has a central brick chimney. It features an imposing gambrel roof and wraparound porch.

It was listed in the National Register of Historic Places in 2010.
