= Bob Comfort =

Canadian-born American screenwriter and producer (1940–2010)

- Born: Robert John Comfort; September 17, 1940; Calgary, Canada
- Died: January 8, 2010 (aged 69); Portland, Oregon, US
- Occupations: Screenwriter, producer

Robert John Comfort (September 17, 1940 – January 8, 2010) was a Canadian-born American screenwriter, producer, and radio host.

Born in Calgary, Comfort began entertainment work as a radio talk show host, later moving to California to pursue television writing. Alongside Rick Kellard, he created the shows The Cheap Show and Wacko. He wrote scripts for numerous other shows, but in the 1980s, left the television industry to write film scripts.

== Early life ==
Comfort was born September 17, 1940, in Calgary. He lived in Drumheller until age 11, moving to Edmonton. One of three siblings, his father was a secondary school educator. He was raised in the Church of the Nazarene, but eventually left and became an atheist due to rejecting the doctrine of creationism.

At age 17, Comfort moved in with family in Pasadena, California, and enlisted in the United States Marine Corps after graduating high school. During a routine bunk inspection, Comfort was asked by a captain what the letters "NP" indicated on his dog tag. After informing the captain that he had "no preference" for a religion, he was told that there are "no atheists in a foxhole". Quickly fabricating a religion, Comfort said he was a "Comfortist," which he explained was "a very small denomination." He also claimed his fellow soldiers were bullying him for his "religion," which caused them to be reprimanded.

Comfort was discharged at age 22, after which he attended Pasadena City College. He said he shared a class with singer Kenny Loggins and future political assassin Sirhan Sirhan, all three of whom were attracted to the same woman. He worked as a bartender for a comedy club, during which he began writing. While working there, he met Kellard, who became a frequent collaborator on scripts.

== Career ==
In 1971, Comfort returned to Canada, and for four years hosted a daily radio talk show on CHED. While hosting, he interviewed "Reverend Smith", a minister he believed to be fraudulent. During the interview, Comfort countered Smith's request to be called by his title, presenting his own certificate of ordination and requesting he be called "Reverend Bob". He also debated Scientology, which caused him to receive death threats. He later worked for CJCA, leaving the station to pursue television writing, a decision he had trouble making.

Comfort and Kellard both found work at Lorimar Television, becoming screenwriters in the early 1980s. Together, they developed the shows The Cheap Show and Wacko, as well as writing scripts for Just Our Luck and The Redd Foxx Show. They created 13 pilot episodes, with 11 having been filmed. In the middle of a sales pitch with CBS, Comfort walked to a corner of the office, squatted, and farted. They parted in 1986, with Comfort pursuing film, while Kellard remained in television. According to his wife, the television industry made him cynical and unable to innovate within.

Before pursuing film, Comfort had written five film scripts, which had all been purchased but unrealized. His breakout film was 1991's Dogfight, which was based on his time in the military. He wrote seventeen more scripts, most of which went unproduced; one halted production midway through, due to the divorce between Tom Arnold and Roseanne Barr, who were its producers. He wrote a screenplay for an American adaptation of Cinema Paradiso, which was bought by Joel Silver and went unproduced. Producers Lauren Shuler Donner and Penny Marshall also own scripts written by him. His last screenplay produced was 1996's Good Luck. Apart from screenwriting, he was president of Tinsel and Sham, an advertising firm. He also played the character of Yardly Footlong, an antagonist against metrication in Canada, who fought Milly Meter. Major political parties encouraged him to participate in elections due to his popularity.

== Personal life and death ==
Comfort married psychologist and novelist Bonnie Comfort in 1977 or 1978. He had a son from a previous marriage. He and his wife moved to Lake Oswego, Oregon, around 1996. In 1993, he was diagnosed with non-Hodgkin lymphoma, the chemotherapy treatment for which his wife said was the cause of his death: Lewy body dementia, which he was diagnosed with in 2004. As his condition worsened, he remained content, and up until six weeks before his death, would play squash. He died on January 8, 2010, aged 69, in Portland, Oregon.

== Credits ==
Listed chronologically. Adopted from TV Guide.

- The John Byner Comedy Hour (1972)
- Wacko (1977)
- Big Bob Johnson and His Fantastic Speed Circus (1978)
- Just Our Luck (1983)
- The Redd Foxx Show (1986)
- Sidekicks (1986–1987)
- Dogfight (1991)
- Good Luck (1996)
- Maximum Bob (1998)
