= Wacko (TV series) =

- Genre: Comedy
- Presented by: Bo Kaprall; Julie McWhirter
- Country of origin: United States
- Original language: English

Production
- Running time: 30 minutes
- Production company: Nephi-Odin Productions

Original release
- Network: CBS
- Release: 10 September – 12 November 1977

Wacko is an American half-hour children's television series that aired on CBS on Saturday mornings. The show was a live action variety show featuring skits and musical numbers. The show only had 10 episodes, from September 10 to November 12, 1977. The show took place in the "Wacko Clubhouse", and kept things moving at a frantic pace.

One recurring skit was called "Clown Doctor", in which a doctor (that happened to be a clown) would call for his nurse by yelling "Noiss Noiss". The harebrained nurse would enter, causing Clown Doctor to point at his forehead (with a camera close-up on him) and say, "Nobody home... vacant".

In addition to comedy skits, the show also would have musical guests. One such guest in Fall of 1977 was The Dwight Twilley Band playing their then new release "I Remember..." with special guest, a then virtually unknown songwriter named Tom Petty on bass guitar.

== Hosts ==
- Bo Kaprall
- Julie McWhirter

== Cast ==
- Bob Comfort
- James Paul
- Millicent Crisp
- Charles Fleischer
- Rick Kellard
- Rip Taylor
