= True Love (1989 film) =

1989 American comedy film directed by Nancy Savoca

- Theatrical release poster
- Directed by: Nancy Savoca
- Written by: Nancy Savoca; Richard Guay
- Produced by: Richard Guay; Shelley Houis
- Starring: Annabella Sciorra; Ron Eldard
- Cinematography: Lisa Rinzler
- Edited by: John Tintori
- Production company: Forward Films
- Distributed by: United Artists (through MGM/UA Communications Co.)
- Release dates: January 1989 (U.S. Film Festival); June 16, 1989 (United States)
- Running time: 104 minutes
- Country: United States
- Languages: English; Italian
- Budget: $750,000
- Box office: $1.4 million

True Love is a 1989 American comedy film directed by Nancy Savoca and starring Annabella Sciorra and Ron Eldard. An unflinching look at the realities of love and marriage which offers no "happily ever after" ending, it won the Grand Jury Prize at the 1989 Sundance Film Festival.

== Plot ==
Donna and Michael are getting married. But first, they have to plan the reception, get the tux, buy the rings, and cope with their own uncertainty about the decision. Michael fears commitment. Donna has her doubts about Michael's immaturity. Both are getting cold feet.

== Cast ==
- Annabella Sciorra as Donna
- Ron Eldard as Michael
- Aida Turturro as Grace
- Roger Rignack as Dom
- Star Jasper as JC
- Michael James Wolfe as Brian
- Kelly Cinnante as Yvonne
- Rick Shapiro as Kevin
- Vincent Pastore as Angelo (Donna's father)

== Production ==
Work on the script for True Love began in 1982, with Nancy Savoca and her husband Richard Guay basing the screenplay off of their personal experiences living in The Bronx. Facing rejection from multiple major studios, Savoca and Guay decided to invest $22,000 into a nine-minute concept trailer to find potential investors for the film. John Sayles and Jonathan Demme, both filmmakers for whom Savoca had worked in the past, as well as Kenneth Utt and Susan Seidelman were among those who invested in the film. The cast and crew agreed to work for deferred salaries, with principal photography taking place between June and August 1988 throughout New York City. The initial budget had been exhausted by the time shooting ended, with continued support from investors and a soundtrack deal with RCA Records ensuring that post-production on the film was completed in time for the 1989 U.S. Film Festival.

== Release ==
True Love premiered at the U.S. Film Festival in January 1989. The film went on to win the festival's Grand Jury Prize Dramatic, but Savoca and Guay were unable to accept the prize in person as the former was giving birth to their second child Kenneth. A bidding war for distribution rights began shortly after the premiere, with multiple studios asking Savoca to change the ending to make it happier. United Artists offered Savoca final cut privilege, prompting her to sell them North American distribution rights to the film in May 1989. The film was released on June 16, 1989 in the United States.

=== Home media ===
True Love was previously released on VHS and DVD and was released for the first time on Blu-ray Disc on April 30, 2024 by Kino Lorber.

== See also ==
- Married to the Mob (1988)
- Moonstruck (1987)

Awards
Preceded by Heat and Sunlight	Sundance Grand Jury Prize: U.S. Dramatic; 1989	Succeeded by Chameleon Street
