= Crown Point Bridge, Indiana =

Coordinates: 41°24′14″N 87°22′22″W

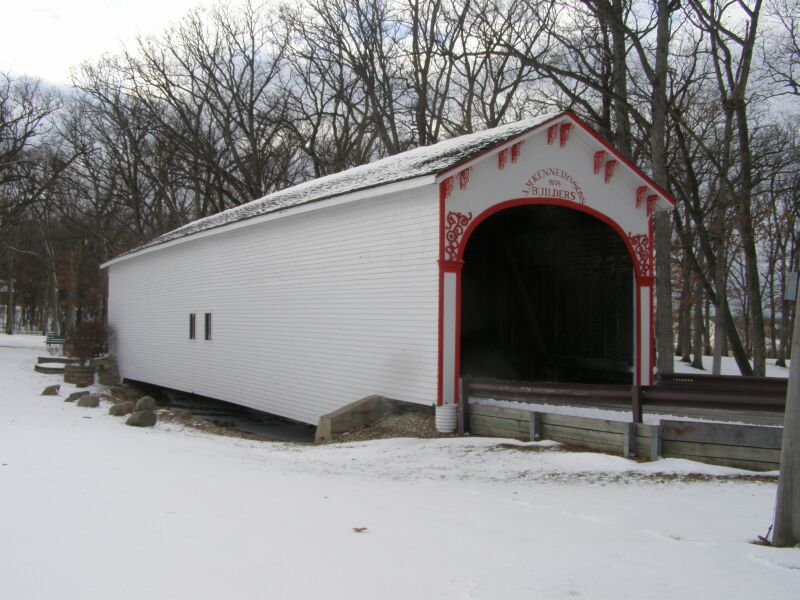
Milroy Covered Bridge, located in Crown Point, Indiana

The Crown Point Bridge is a covered bridge in the city of Crown Point in the U.S. state of Indiana. Originally built over the Little Flatrock River, two miles south of Milroy, Rush County, Indiana (Section 24, Township 12 North, and Range 9 East), the Milroy or Shelbourne Covered Bridge was built by Archibald M. Kennedy & Sons in 1878. Highway improvements in 1933 displaced the bridge, and it was moved to Crown Point, Indiana. John Wheeler led the preservation effort, having the structure dismantled, moved, and erected in the Lake County Fairgrounds over a gully.

The bridge is a single-span Burr Arch Truss. It has an 85-foot-long (26 m) span; with a 10-foot (3.0 m) portal at each end, its total length is 105 feet (32 m). The bridge has a clearance 16 feet (4.9 m) wide by 14 feet (4.3 m) high.
