= Dancenoise =

American performance art duo

Dancenoise is an American performance art duo created by Anne Iobst and Lucy Sexton. Dancenoise entered the New York and Washington, D.C., art and club scene in 1983, performing at venues such as WOW Café, the Pyramid, 8BC, Performance Space 122, Franklin Furnace, The Kitchen, La Mama, Danspace Project, and King Tut’s Wah Wah Hut. Their work has also been presented around Europe as well as at the Lincoln Center for the Performing Arts. Dancenoise has also collaborated with other artists including Charles Atlas, Mike Taylor, Ishmael Houston-Jones, and Yvonne Meier. In addition to their work under the title Dancenoise, Iobst and Sexton, along with Jo Andres and Mimi Goese, were frequent collaborators with Tom Murrin, an East Village performance artist known for his monthly celebrations in honor of the full moon. Dancenoise is a recipient of National Endowment of the Arts Choreographic Fellowships and a Bessie Award for New York Dance and Theatre.

In 2010, Sexton became the producer of the Bessie Awards and, as of August, 2012, was overhauling the award to consider a broader range of dance genres, extend the award's notoriety, and offer a commissioned prize to artists. In 2015, the Whitney Museum of American Art featured Dancenoise in a week-long exhibition, "Dancenoise: Don't Look Back."
