= Lillian Holley =

American sheriff (1890–1994)

- Born: Lillian Mae Hatch; August 11, 1890; Indiana, United States
- Died: June 12, 1994 (aged 103)
- Burial place: Beaver City Cemetery
- Occupation: Sheriff

Lillian Mae Holley (née Hatch; 11 August 1890 – 12 June 1994) was an American sheriff. She was famous for being the sheriff of Lake County, Indiana whose jail John Dillinger escaped from in 1934.

== Career ==
Lillian Holley took over as Lake County Sheriff after the former sheriff, her husband Roy F. Holley, was killed in action. Roy Holley was killed while attempting to arrest a farmer who had shot and killed a neighboring farmer in Ross. The farmer wounded seven police officers before killing himself. Lillian Holley served two years, finishing out her husband's second term as sheriff.

=== John Dillinger escape ===
On March 3, 1934, John Dillinger escaped from the Lake County jail while Holley was serving as sheriff, though fault likely lay with the prison warden and his officers.

The press, as well as other officials, called attention to Holley's gender, saying it was the reason Dillinger managed to escape. Chicago Crime Commissioner Frank J. Loesch was quoted as saying, "That's what might be expected of having a woman for sheriff." Some media outlets were kinder to Holley. The Tulsa Daily World called Holley an excellent markswoman and quoted her as saying, "If I ever see John Dillinger again, I'll shoot him dead with my own pistol." Later, Archibald McKinlay, a local historian and columnist, called Holley "courageous, determined, and remarkably resilient," indicating that these traits were necessary to endure the intense scrutiny following Dillinger's escape.

== Legacy ==
She is portrayed by Lili Taylor in the 2009 film Public Enemies.

In 2017, The Historic Lake County Courthouse in Crown Point, Indiana put on a play about Lillian Holley's life called "Lillian", written by former Crown Point High School's art teacher and drama director Marion Kellum.

== Personal life ==
Holley was born 11 August 1890. She had two twin daughters, and at least two grandchildren.

She died 12 June 1994 in Crown Point, Indiana.
