= Dogfight (film) =

1991 film directed by Nancy Savoca

- Theatrical release poster
- Directed by: Nancy Savoca
- Written by: Bob Comfort
- Produced by: Richard Guay; Peter Newman
- Starring: River Phoenix; Lili Taylor
- Cinematography: Bobby Bukowski
- Edited by: John Tintori
- Music by: Sarah Class; Mason Daring
- Distributed by: Warner Bros. Pictures
- Release date: October 4, 1991
- Running time: 93 minutes
- Country: United States
- Language: English
- Box office: $394,631

Dogfight is a 1991 period coming-of-age drama film set in San Francisco, California, during the 1960s and directed by Nancy Savoca. The film explores the love between an 18-year-old Marine, Lance Corporal Eddie Birdlace (River Phoenix), on his way to Vietnam, and a young woman, Rose Fenny (Lili Taylor).

== Plot ==
The film begins on November 21, 1963, the day before the assassination of President John F. Kennedy. Lance Corporal Birdlace and three of his Marine buddies have arrived in San Francisco for a twenty-four hour leave before shipping off to Okinawa, and are planning on attending a "dogfight" later that evening, a party at which Marines compete to bring the ugliest date, unbeknownst to the girls. After a few women reject his advances, Birdlace ducks into a coffee shop, where he encounters Rose, a waitress on her break, practicing her guitar; she is not particularly ugly, but rather plain, shy and awkward. Birdlace attempts to charm Rose and invites her to a party. She is suspicious of his motives, but decides to accept his invitation.

While walking to the bar where the dogfight is being held, Birdlace realises Rose is not ugly enough to compete and also begins to have second thoughts about playing such a cruel trick on her. He attempts to talk her out of going in, but has no choice but to proceed inside when they encounter one of Birdlace's buddies and his date. Birdlace proceeds to get drunk, presumably feeling guilty. Shortly after, Rose convinces Birdlace to dance with her, which he initially resists, as the dance floor is where the dates will be judged. Marcie, the date brought by Birdlace's friend Berzin, is declared the winner. In the ladies' room, it is revealed that Marcie is actually a prostitute whom Berzin has hired, in violation of the rules of the dogfight, cluing Rose in to the true nature of the party. Devastated, Rose punches Birdlace and angrily lambasts him before storming off. Birdlace immediately regrets having treated Rose so cruelly, and chases after her. He convinces her to let him buy her dinner in an attempt to make it up to her.

After dinner, the two walk to a club where Rose hopes to perform soon, and then to an arcade. Birdlace is surprised to find himself enjoying spending time with Rose, so much so that he forgets that he was to have met up with his three buddies at a tattoo parlor. Rose tells Birdlace about her dream of becoming a folk singer, and he reveals to her that he will be shipping off to Okinawa the following day, and from there on to "a little country called Vietnam," he hopes. She offers to write to him, and asks if he will write back. Birdlace walks Rose home, and she hesitantly invites him in. They attempt to talk, but end up having a self-conscious yet tender sexual encounter.

As he is leaving at dawn, Rose gives him her address and asks him to write. Birdlace meets up with his buddies as they board their bus; Birdlace makes up a story about not showing up because he spent the night with the beautiful wife of an officer. Berzin later shares with Birdlace that he saw him with Rose; Birdlace counters that he is aware that Marcie was actually a prostitute. They agree to keep one another's secrets, as Birdlace tears up Rose's address and throws it out the window of the bus. The next day, Rose weeps and watches coverage of President Kennedy's assassination on TV with her mother. Later, in 1966, Birdlace and his three friends have been deployed to Chu Lai, South Vietnam. While playing cards, they are suddenly hit with a mortar; chaos ensues, during which Birdlace is wounded in the leg.

A year later, Birdlace gets off a Greyhound bus in San Francisco. Discharged from the Marines, he now walks with a limp, and it is suggested that his three friends were all killed in combat. He walks to the neighborhood where Rose's coffee shop is and goes to a bar across the street, where the bartender tells him that Rose's mother has turned the coffee shop over to Rose. Birdlace makes his way across the street and into the coffee shop. Rose, not having heard from him in three years, is surprised to see him, and can only say "hi". She goes over to him, and they embrace.

== Cast ==
- River Phoenix as Eddie Birdlace
- Lili Taylor as Rose Fenny
- John Lacy as Fector
- E. G. Daily as Marcie
- Richard Panebianco as Berzin
- Anthony Clark as Oakie, one of Birdlace's Marine friends
- Mitchell Whitfield as Benjamin, one of Birdlace's Marine friends
- Holly Near as Rose's mother
- Brendan Fraser as Sailor No. 1, who gets into a fight with the Marines (this is Fraser's debut, credited as "Brendon Fraser")
- Jessica Wallenfels as Arcade Girl

== Release ==
The premiere of Dogfight was a screening at the Telluride Film Festival in Colorado on August 30, 1991, with a New York premiere on September 13, 1991. It also had an opening in Los Angeles on September 27, 1991. It was released in the United States on October 4, 1991, by Warner Bros. Pictures.

=== Home media ===
Dogfight was released by Criterion on Blu-ray in the United States on April 30, 2024, and in the UK on May 6, 2024. Previously it had been released on DVD. The Blu-ray release includes interviews with Savoca and actor Lili Taylor, a trailer and an audio commentary with Savoca and producer Richard Guay.

== Reception ==
The film received praise from critics. On Rotten Tomatoes, it has an 83% approval rating based on 24 reviews. Kenneth Turan of the Los Angeles Times wrote that "'Dogfight' is two characters in search of a film. And very fine characters they happen to be, as winsome a pair of young people as anyone would ever want to meet. Which makes it all the more a wonder that their on-screen adventures can’t seem to go anywhere at all." Roger Ebert remarked that the film "isn't a love story so much as a story about how a young woman helps a confused teenage boy to discover his own better nature. The fact that his discoveries take place on the night before he ships out to fight the war in Vietnam only makes the story more poignant."

In a mixed review, Peter Travers of Rolling Stone wrote that "Dogfight doesn’t sum up an era; it merely romanticizes it. What could have been an incisive movie about alienation deteriorates into a conventional romance." Vincent Canby of The New York Times wrote that "Dogfight...seems to have no clear idea of what these ordinary people are really like. The film wants to be honest (and in its cruelties, it is), but the operative sensibility is that of a sitcom world. The characters aren't necessarily idealized, but they are flat and uninteresting. The material is lugubrious. The only seemingly spontaneous moment comes at the very end, which is too late." Dustin Putman referred to the film as "a virtually unknown gem" and "one of the sweetest, most touching romances of the decade."

== Soundtrack ==
The film's soundtrack featured a number of prominent 1960s artists, including Muddy Waters, The Weavers, Van Morrison, Elizabeth Cotten, Pete Seeger and Malvina Reynolds.

== Musical adaptation ==
In June 2012, Second Stage Theatre debuted the musical adaptation. The show, which features music and lyrics by Benj Pasek and Justin Paul and a book by Peter Duchan, was directed by Joe Mantello and choreographed by Christopher Gattelli. It starred Lindsay Mendez as Rose and Derek Klena as Eddie. The cast also included Nick Blaemire, Annaleigh Ashford, Steven Booth, Becca Ayers, Adam Halpin, Dierdre Friel, F. Michael Haynie, James Moye and Josh Segarra. David Zinn designed sets and costumes and Paul Gallo designed the lights. The production opened on July 16, 2012, after previews from June 27, and concluded its limited run on August 19. The show received rave reviews for its young writers and for leading lady Lindsay Mendez's tour de force performance.

Dogfight earned two 2013 Lucille Lortel Awards for Outstanding Musical and Outstanding Choreographer (Christopher Gattelli). It was nominated for five 2013 Outer Critics Circle Awards: Outstanding New Off-Broadway Musical, Outstanding New Score (Broadway or Off-Broadway), Outstanding Book of a Musical (Broadway or Off-Broadway), Outstanding Actress in a Musical (Lindsay Mendez), and Outstanding Lighting Design (Paul Gallo). The show was also nominated for two 2013 Drama League Awards for Outstanding Production of a Broadway or Off-Broadway Musical and Distinguished Performance (Lindsay Mendez), as well as the 2013 Drama Desk Award for Outstanding Actress in a Musical (Lindsay Mendez).

The original cast recording was released on April 30, 2013.

In August 2014, the musical had its European premiere at the Southwark Playhouse in London, directed by Matt Ryan.
