= Tom Murrin =

American performance artist and playwright (1939–2012)

- Born: February 8, 1939
- Died: March 12, 2012 (aged 73)
- Known for: Performance art

Tom Murrin (February 8, 1939 – March 12, 2012), also known as Jack Bump, Tom Trash, and The Alien Comic, was an American performance artist and playwright in the downtown avant-garde art scene in New York City. In the 1980s and 1990s, Murrin curated a variety night called The Full Moon Show at Performance Space 122 and later at La Mama and Dixon Place. In 2013, Dixon Place introduced a performance award, "The Tommy," to honor Murrin's life and work.
