= King Tut's Wah Wah Hut (New York City) =

Former club and theater space in Manhattan, New York

Coordinates: 40.725796°N 73.983891°W

King Tut's Wah Wah Hut was a club and experimental theater space in the East Village of New York City, operating in the mid-1980s and 1990s at 112 Avenue A at 7th Street. The club was "Egyptian themed".

Among the acts presented at the club were Dancenoise (which curated a regular performance series there), Carmelita Tropicana and Blue Man Group.

In July 2015, the Whitney Museum of American Art commissioned one of the original designers of the club, Tom Berry, to create a temporary King Tut's Wah Wah Hut in its lobby for use as a theater in connection with its retrospective of the work of Dancenoise.

The music venue King Tut's Wah Wah Hut, in Glasgow, Scotland, took its name from the New York City club.
