= Richard Guay (film producer) =

American film producer

- Born: United States
- Occupation: Film producer
- Spouse: Nancy Savoca (m. 1980)

Richard Guay is a New York City based American film producer.

His productions include True Love (1989) which won the Grand Jury Prize at the 1989 Sundance Film Festival, Dogfight (1991), Ghost Dog: The Way of the Samurai (1999), Kinsey (2004), and Shutter (2008).

He has been married to Nancy Savoca since 1980, and they have three children.
