= Nancy Savoca =

American film producer

- Born: Nancy Laura Savoca; July 23, 1959 (age 66); New York City, U.S.
- Occupations: Film director; writer; producer
- Years active: 1980–present
- Spouse: Richard Guay (m. 1980)
- Children: 3
- Website: nancysavoca.com

Nancy Laura Savoca (born July 23, 1959) is an American film director, producer, and screenwriter.

== Early life and education ==
Nancy Laura Savoca was born in 1959 in the Bronx, New York, to immigrants Maria Elvira from Argentina and Carlos Savoca from Sicily. She attended local schools. After completing her courses at Queens College, Flushing, New York, Savoca went on to graduate in 1982 from New York University's film school, the Tisch School of the Arts. While there, she received the Haig P. Manoogian Award for overall excellence for her short films Renata and Bad Timing.

== Career ==
=== 1985–1999 ===
After film school, Savoca worked as a storyboard artist and assistant editor on various independent films and music videos. Her first professional experience was as a production assistant to John Sayles on his film The Brother From Another Planet, and as an assistant auditor for Jonathan Demme on two of his films: Something Wild (1986), and Married to the Mob (1988).

In 1989, she directed her first full-length movie, the privately funded True Love, about Italian-American marriage rituals in the Bronx. It won the Grand Jury Prize at the Sundance Film Festival. The movie, starring Annabella Sciorra and Ron Eldard, both making their film debuts, was praised as one of the best films of the year by both Janet Maslin and Vincent Canby of the New York Times. Savoca was nominated for a Spirit Award as Best Director. MGM/UA picked up the distribution rights and RCA released the soundtrack, with two songs reaching the Top 40 hits on the Billboard charts.

Since then she has written, directed and produced movies for the big screen and television, written or polished scripts for other directors, and directed a number of episodes in ongoing television series. She was among five writers and co-wrote all three segments of the Demi Moore-produced If These Walls Could Talk, a miniseries about abortion rights, and she directed the first two segments. The second segment starred Sissy Spacek, who played a married woman who does not think she can afford another child. Cher starred in and directed the third segment, in which she played a doctor targeted by anti-abortion activists. It was nominated for four Primetime Emmy Awards and three Golden Globe Awards, including Best Miniseries or Television Film.

In 1998, Savoca was feted as a "New York trailblazer" at the New York Women's Film Festival. Savoca was also honored by the Los Angeles chapter of the advocacy organization, Women in Film and Television.

Two of Savoca's films, Household Saints and True Love, are listed in The New York Times Guide to the Best 1,000 Movies Ever Made, published by St. Martin's Griffin. Her film True Love was called one of the "50 Greatest Independent Films of All Time" by Entertainment Weekly.

Nancy Savoca's work has also been the subject of a retrospective by the American Museum of the Moving Image.

=== 2000 and later ===
Savoca directed the 2002 concert film Reno: Rebel without a Pause starring comedian Reno.

In 2012, Savoca and Guay were shooting a documentary on Gato Barbieri, an Argentinian jazz saxophonist. They were also currently working towards the filming of Ki Longfellow's novel The Secret Magdalene (Eio Books, 2005; Random House, 2007) in which Savoca was again the screenwriter and director, while Guay was producing.

When Revolution Books screened Dirt on August 11, 2010, Savoca appeared for a Q&A. Shot in NYC and El Salvador, Dirt is a tragicomedy about an undocumented cleaning woman.

In February 2011, Colombia held a retrospective of Savoca's work which she attended.

Savoca completed an independent feature, Union Square, starring Mira Sorvino, Tammy Blanchard, Patti LuPone, Mike Doyle, Michael Rispoli and Daphne Rubin-Vega. Madeleine Peyroux recorded an end song for the film which was invited to open in 2011's Toronto International Film Festival. It was released in selected theaters throughout the United States.

On June 4, 2012, Nancy Savoca received a Best in the Biz tribute in Canada's 10th Anniversary Female Eye Film Festival.

On July 13, 2012, Union Square opened in New York City, Los Angeles and Toronto. An independent film shot in 12 days for less than $100,000, it received widespread notice from major print sources such as The New York Times and the Los Angeles Times, to online sources like Newsday, Yahoo Voices and the Pasadena Sun.

In the fall of 2012, Nancy directed a short film for Scenarios USA, an organization that uses the stories of high school students, transforming them into professionally made short films. Nancy worked with student screenwriters to help develop their original ideas into films that air on Showtime and become part of an innovative teaching curriculum used in high schools around the country.

== Personal life ==
Nancy Savoca is married to her long time professional partner, Richard Guay.

== Awards and nominations ==
- Haig P. Manoogian Award, 1982, New York University
- Grand Jury Prize, 1989 Sundance Film Festival – True Love
- Winner, 1989 San Sebastián International Film Festival – True Love
- Nominated, Best Director, 1990 Independent Spirit Award – True Love
- Nominated, Best Screenplay, 1994 Independent Spirit Award – Household Saints
- Winner, 1996 Lucy Award – If These Walls Could Talk
- Nominated, Outstanding Director of a Feature Film, 2000 ALMA – The 24-Hour Woman
- Winner, Best Director, 2004 Los Angeles Latino International Film Festival – Dirt

== Filmography ==
- Renata (1982) (short film)
- Bad Timing (1982) (short film)
- True Love (1989)
- Dogfight (1991)
- Household Saints (1993) (also co-writer, with Richard Guay)
- Dark Eyes (1995) (TV)
- Murder One (1995) (TV)
- If These Walls Could Talk (1996) (TV) (also co-writer, with I. Marlene King and Susan Nanus)
- The 24 Hour Woman (1999) (also co-writer, with Richard Guay)
- Third Watch (2000) (TV)
- The Mind of the Married Man (2001) (TV)
- Dirt (2003) (also co-writer, with Richard Guay) (TV)
- Reno: Rebel without a Pause (2003) (TV) (also co-producer)
- Union Square (2012) (also co-writer, with Mary Tobler)

== Television director ==
- Chapter Five, Murder One, ABC (1995)
- 1952 and 1974 – If These Walls Could Talk miniseries (1996)
- Know Thyself, Third Watch, NBC (2000)
- Anywhere, Anytime, The Mind of the Married Man, HBO (2001)
- Dirt, Showtime (2003)
- The Great Spacecoaster syndicated children's series (1980s)

== As writer ==
- Renata (short film, co-writer) (1982)
- Bad Timing (short film, co-writer) (1982)
- True Love (co-writer with Richard Guay) (1989)
- Household Saints (co-writer with Richard Guay) (1993)
- If These Walls Could Talk (co-writer) (1996)
- The 24 Hour Woman (co-writer with Richard Guay) (1999)
- The Secret Magdalene (2012)
- Union Square (co-writer with Mary Tobler) (2012)
