= National Register of Historic Places listings in Lake County, Indiana =

Location of Lake County in Indiana

This is a list of the National Register of Historic Places listings in Lake County, Indiana.

This is intended to be a complete list of the properties and districts on the National Register of Historic Places in Lake County, Indiana, United States. Latitude and longitude coordinates are provided for many National Register properties and districts; these locations may be seen together in a map.

There are 85 properties and districts listed on the National Register in the county. Another 2 properties were once listed but have been removed.

Properties and districts located in incorporated areas display the name of the municipality, while properties and districts in unincorporated areas display the name of their civil township. Properties and districts split between multiple jurisdictions display the names of all jurisdictions.

This National Park Service list is complete through NPS recent listings posted October 30, 2026.

== Current listings ==
	Name on the Register	Image	Date listed	Location	City or town	Description
1	Walter Allman House	Walter Allman House	December 27, 2010 (#10001077)	102 S. East St. 41°25′04″N 87°21′43″W	Crown Point	
2	American Sheet and Tin Mill Apartment Building	American Sheet and Tin Mill Apartment Building	June 17, 2009 (#09000427)	633 W. 4th Ave. 41°36′13″N 87°20′44″W	Gary	
3	Louis J. Bailey Branch Library-Gary International Institute	Louis J. Bailey Branch Library-Gary International Institute	September 29, 2004 (#04001102)	1501 S. Madison St. 41°35′16″N 87°20′29″W	Gary	
4	James Brannon House	James Brannon House	March 21, 2011 (#11000120)	260 Burnham St. 41°17′42″N 87°24′53″W	Lowell	
5	Buckley Homestead	Buckley Homestead	December 6, 1984 (#84000503)	3606 Belshaw Rd., southeast of Lowell; 41°16′53″N 87°22′43″W	Cedar Creek Township	
6	Wellington A. Clark House	Wellington A. Clark House	June 6, 2001 (#01000619)	227 S. Court St. 41°24′57″N 87°21′57″W	Crown Point	
7	Combs Addition Historic District	Combs Addition Historic District	September 30, 2014 (#14000805)	400 and 500 blocks of Rutledge and Ellsworth Sts., and the 500 block of Marshall St. between 4th and 6th Aves. 41°36′10″N 87°22′10″W	Gary	
8	Crawford-Winslow House	Crawford-Winslow House	June 25, 2013 (#13000422)	357 S. Main St. 41°24′47″N 87°21′53″W	Crown Point	
9	Crown Point Courthouse Square Historic District	Crown Point Courthouse Square Historic District	March 22, 2004 (#04000203)	Roughly bounded by Clark St., the alley east of Main St., Hack Ct., and Court St.; also roughly bounded by Robinson, East, Walnut, and Court Sts.; also 208 Main St. 41°25′02″N 87°21′56″W	Crown Point	Second set of boundaries represents a boundary adjustment of December 8, 2005; 208 Main represents a boundary increase of March 29, 2007
10	Morse Dell Plain House and Garden	Morse Dell Plain House and Garden	April 1, 1998 (#98000298)	7109 Knickerbocker Parkway; 41°35′03″N 87°28′39″W	Hammond	
11	Ralph Waldo Emerson School	Ralph Waldo Emerson School	June 9, 1995 (#95000702)	716 E. 7th Ave. 41°35′57″N 87°19′39″W	Gary	
12	Eskilson Historic District	Eskilson Historic District	March 26, 2014 (#14000073)	Roughly bounded by W. 3rd Ave. and the alleys between Garfield and Hayes Sts., W. 4th Pl., and W. 5th Ave., Cleveland St., and McKinley St. 41°36′13″N 87°21′37″W	Gary	
13	First Unitarian Church of Hobart	First Unitarian Church of Hobart	September 9, 1999 (#99001112)	497 Main St. 41°31′48″N 87°15′11″W	Hobart	
14	Forest-Ivanhoe Residential Historic District	Forest-Ivanhoe Residential Historic District	March 31, 2010 (#10000124)	Roughly bounded by 172nd Pl., the eastern side of Forest Ave. south to its end, and the Little Calumet River; 41°34′51″N 87°31′25″W	Hammond	
15	Forest-Moraine Residential Historic District	Forest-Moraine Residential Historic District	September 23, 2010 (#10000777)	Roughly bounded by Wildwood Rd., 165th St., Hohman Ave. and State Line Ave. 41°35′53″N 87°31′24″W	Hammond	
16	Forest-Southview Residential Historic District	Forest-Southview Residential Historic District	September 23, 2010 (#10000778)	Roughly bounded by 165th St., Hohman Ave., Locust St. and State Line Ave. 41°35′37″N 87°31′25″W	Hammond	
17	Gary Bathing Beach Aquatorium	Gary Bathing Beach Aquatorium	November 25, 1994 (#94001354)	One Marquette Dr., Marquette Park; 41°37′11″N 87°15′24″W	Gary	
18	Gary City Center Historic District	Gary City Center Historic District	November 25, 1994 (#94001352)	Roughly Broadway from the Chicago SouthShore and South Bend railroad tracks to 9th Ave. 41°36′01″N 87°20′13″W	Gary	
19	Gary Land Company Building	Gary Land Company Building	May 8, 1979 (#79000021)	4th Ave. and Massachusetts St. 41°36′15″N 87°20′09″W	Gary	
20	Gary Public Schools Memorial Auditorium	Gary Public Schools Memorial Auditorium	November 25, 1994 (#94001353)	700-734 Massachusetts St. 41°35′53″N 87°20′10″W	Gary	
21	Gary Union Station	Gary Union Station	June 6, 2019 (#100004040)	251 N. Broadway; 41°36′20″N 87°20′13″W	Gary	
22	Glendale Park Historic District	Glendale Park Historic District	June 25, 2013 (#13000423)	17-64 Glendale Parkway; 41°36′07″N 87°31′24″W	Hammond	
23	E.J. and E. Griffith Interlocking Tower	E.J. and E. Griffith Interlocking Tower	September 28, 2003 (#03000980)	201 S. Broad St. 41°31′16″N 87°25′39″W	Griffith	
24	Griffith Grand Trunk Depot	Griffith Grand Trunk Depot	September 28, 2003 (#03000985)	201 S. Broad St. 41°31′16″N 87°25′39″W	Griffith	
25	Griffith State Bank		June 3, 2019 (#100004050)	101 E. Main St. 41°31′22″N 87°25′39″W	Griffith	
26	Melvin A. Halsted House	Melvin A. Halsted House	December 8, 1978 (#78000037)	201 E. Main St. 41°17′36″N 87°25′21″W	Lowell	
27	Hansen Branch-Hammond Public Library		November 29, 2019 (#100004719)	2823 Martha St., 6736 Alabama Ave. 41°35′26″N 87°27′38″W	Hammond	
28	Hobart Carnegie Library	Hobart Carnegie Library	July 15, 1982 (#82000047)	706 E. 4th St. 41°31′55″N 87°15′07″W	Hobart	
29	Hobart Commercial District	Hobart Commercial District	December 16, 2014 (#14001037)	Roughly bounded by Lake George, the Norfolk Southern rail line, and Center and 2nd Sts.. 41°31′55″N 87°15′17″W	Hobart	
30	Hobart First Methodist Episcopal Church	Hobart First Methodist Episcopal Church	December 7, 2017 (#100001880)	650 and 654 E. 4th St. 41°31′55″N 87°15′08″W	Hobart	
31	Hohman Avenue Commercial Historic District	Hohman Avenue Commercial Historic District	March 21, 2011 (#11000118)	Approximately three blocks lining Hohman Ave. between Clinton St. and Rimbach St. 41°37′02″N 87°31′19″W	Hammond	
32	Hoosier Theater Building	Hoosier Theater Building	February 18, 1987 (#87000069)	1329-1335 119th St. 41°40′46″N 87°29′47″W	Whiting	
33	Ibach House	Ibach House	December 27, 2010 (#10001078)	1908 Ridge Rd. 41°33′26″N 87°28′56″W	Munster	
34	Indi-Illi Park Historic District	Indi-Illi Park Historic District	June 15, 2012 (#12000335)	Roughly bounded by Locust and 169th Sts., and Hohman and State Line Aves. 41°35′24″N 87°31′28″W	Hammond	
35	Indiana Harbor Public Library	Indiana Harbor Public Library	September 15, 2005 (#05001014)	3605 Grand Ave. 41°38′51″N 87°26′58″W	East Chicago	
36	Jackson-Monroe Terraces Historic District	Jackson-Monroe Terraces Historic District	June 17, 2009 (#09000428)	404-423 Jackson St. and 408-426 Monroe St. 41°36′12″N 87°20′39″W	Gary	
37	Jefferson Street Historic District	Jefferson Street Historic District	September 18, 2013 (#13000723)	Roughly bounded by Washington St. and 37th, 35th, Jefferson, and Madison Aves. 41°33′10″N 87°20′21″W	Gary	
38	Francis P. Keilman House	Francis P. Keilman House	March 20, 2013 (#13000084)	9260 Patterson St. 41°27′03″N 87°28′17″W	St. John	
39	Kingsbury-Doak Farmhouse	Kingsbury-Doak Farmhouse	September 15, 2005 (#05001013)	4411 E. 153rd Ave., west of Hebron; 41°20′20″N 87°17′11″W	Eagle Creek Township	
40	Knights of Columbus Building	Knights of Columbus Building	March 1, 1984 (#84001065)	333 W. 5th Ave. 41°36′06″N 87°20′30″W	Gary	
41	Lake County Courthouse	Lake County Courthouse	May 17, 1973 (#73000073)	Public Sq. 41°25′02″N 87°21′57″W	Crown Point	
42	Lake County Tuberculosis Sanatorium, Nurses Home and Superintendent's House	Lake County Tuberculosis Sanatorium, Nurses Home and Superintendent's House	June 17, 2005 (#05000608)	2323 N. Main St. and 425 W. 93rd Ave. 41°27′04″N 87°21′55″W	Crown Point	427 W. 93rd represents a boundary increase of January 9, 2013
43	Lake County Sheriff's House and Jail	Lake County Sheriff's House and Jail	January 4, 1989 (#88003039)	232 S. Main St. 41°24′56″N 87°21′51″W	Crown Point	
44	Lassen Hotel	Lassen Hotel	July 7, 1981 (#81000019)	7808 W. 138th Pl. 41°22′06″N 87°25′30″W	Cedar Lake	
45	Lincoln Street Historic District	Lincoln Street Historic District	December 31, 2013 (#13001012)	Roughly bounded by Fillmore and Hayes Sts. and 6th and 8th Aves. 41°35′57″N 87°21′17″W	Gary	
46	Lowell Commercial Historic District	Lowell Commercial Historic District	March 26, 2003 (#03000144)	305-519 Commercial Ave. and 108-110 Clark St. 41°17′30″N 87°25′23″W	Lowell	
47	Albert Maack House	Albert Maack House	June 23, 2011 (#11000383)	498 S. Court St. 41°24′34″N 87°21′58″W	Crown Point	
48	Horace Mann Historic District	Horace Mann Historic District	September 18, 2013 (#13000722)	Roughly bounded by W. 5th, 8th, and 7th Aves., and Cleveland and Roosevelt Sts. 41°36′00″N 87°21′47″W	Gary	
49	Marktown Historic District	Marktown Historic District	February 20, 1975 (#75000025)	Bounded by Pine, Riley, Dickey, and 129th Sts. 41°39′31″N 87°28′04″W	East Chicago	
50	MATERIAL SERVICE (shipwreck)	MATERIAL SERVICE (shipwreck)	March 25, 2014 (#14000074)	Lake Michigan, northeast of Calumet Harbor; 41°44′33″N 87°30′23″W	North Township	
51	Andrew Means Park Manor Historic District		August 20, 2024 (#100010739)	Bounded by 19th Avenue, 21st Avenue, and Madison and Polk Streets; 41°34′56″N 87°20′47″W	Gary	
52	Joseph Ernest Meyer House	Joseph Ernest Meyer House	March 1, 1984 (#84001068)	1370 Joliet St. 41°29′26″N 87°29′48″W	Dyer	
53	Miller Town Hall	Miller Town Hall	July 7, 1978 (#78000038)	Junction of Miller Ave., Old Hobart Rd., and Grand Boulevard; 41°36′02″N 87°15′41″W	Gary	
54	Monon Park Dancing Pavilion	Monon Park Dancing Pavilion	January 3, 2001 (#00001540)	13701 Lauerman St. 41°22′07″N 87°26′22″W	Cedar Lake	
55	Monroe Terrace Historic District	Monroe Terrace Historic District	June 17, 2009 (#09000429)	304-318 Monroe St. 41°36′19″N 87°20′37″W	Gary	
56	Morgan-Skinner-Boyd Homestead	Morgan-Skinner-Boyd Homestead	December 27, 2010 (#10001079)	111 E. 73rd Ave. 41°29′08″N 87°20′02″W	Merrillville	
57	Morningside Historic District	Morningside Historic District	September 24, 2009 (#09000758)	Roughly bounded by the eastern side of Washington, the western side of Jefferson, and 45th and 47th Sts. 41°32′05″N 87°20′22″W	Gary	
58	Carolyn Mosby Senior High Rise		May 24, 2022 (#100007736)	650 Jackson St. 41°35′56″N 87°20′41″W	Gary	
59	Charles E. Nichols House	Charles E. Nichols House	June 24, 2010 (#10000375)	231 W. Commercial Ave. 41°17′23″N 87°25′39″W	Lowell	
60	North Gleason Park Community Building		August 24, 2021 (#100006843)	301 West 30th Ave. 41°33′49″N 87°20′27″W	Gary	
61	Northern States Life Insurance Company	Northern States Life Insurance Company	June 24, 2010 (#10000376)	5935 Hohman Ave. 41°36′20″N 87°31′18″W	Hammond	
62	Pennsylvania Railroad Station	Pennsylvania Railroad Station	March 1, 1984 (#84001070)	1001 Lillian St. 41°32′04″N 87°14′50″W	Hobart	
63	Polk Street Concrete Cottage Historic District	Polk Street Concrete Cottage Historic District	September 15, 2011 (#11000657)	604-614 Polk St. 41°35′59″N 87°21′00″W	Gary	
64	Polk Street Terraces Historic District	Polk Street Terraces Historic District	June 17, 2009 (#09000430)	404-422 and 437-455 Polk St. 41°36′13″N 87°20′59″W	Gary	
65	Pullman-Standard Historic District	Pullman-Standard Historic District	April 10, 2012 (#12000186)	Roughly bounded by Columbia, Field, Porter, and Willard Aves. 41°36′17″N 87°29′53″W	Hammond	
66	Theodore Roosevelt High School	Theodore Roosevelt High School	December 19, 2012 (#12001059)	730 W. 25th St. 41°34′28″N 87°20′42″W	Gary	
67	Roselawn-Forest Heights Historic District	Roselawn-Forest Heights Historic District	December 19, 2012 (#12001060)	Roughly bounded by Lawndale, 172nd Pl., and Hohman and State Line Aves. 41°35′12″N 87°31′26″W	Hammond	
68	John Ross Farm	John Ross Farm	March 27, 1996 (#96000283)	3815 E. U.S. Route 231, northwest of Leroy; 41°22′14″N 87°17′21″W	Winfield Township	
69	J. Claude Rumsey House	J. Claude Rumsey House	December 22, 2008 (#08001211)	709 Michigan Ave. 41°17′44″N 87°25′00″W	Lowell	
70	Barney Sablotny House	Barney Sablotny House	December 19, 2012 (#12001061)	501 W. 47th St. 41°31′59″N 87°20′33″W	Gary	
71	St. Augustine's Episcopal Church	St. Augustine's Episcopal Church	September 18, 2013 (#13000758)	2425 W. 19th Ave. 41°35′03″N 87°22′05″W	Gary	
72	St. John's Lutheran Church and School	St. John's Lutheran Church and School	December 3, 2019 (#100004723)	2271 West 10th Ave. 41°35′35″N 87°21′57″W	Gary	
73	St. Mark A.M.E. Zion Church		September 2, 2025 (#100012182)	4200 Alder Street; 41°38′11″N 87°26′33″W	East Chicago	
74	St. Mary's Byzantine Catholic Parish Campus	St. Mary's Byzantine Catholic Parish Campus	January 9, 2026 (#100012520)	2011 Clark Street; 41°40′38″N 87°29′45″W	Whiting	
75	Henry and Caroline Schrage House	Henry and Caroline Schrage House	May 13, 2021 (#100006562)	2006 Schrage Ave. 41°40′36″N 87°29′23″W	Whiting	
76	Southmoor Apartment Hotel	Southmoor Apartment Hotel	March 21, 2011 (#11000125)	5946 Hohman Ave. 41°36′19″N 87°31′20″W	Hammond	
77	Stallbohm Barn-Kaske House	Stallbohm Barn-Kaske House	April 1, 1998 (#98000303)	1154 Ridge Rd. 41°33′35″N 87°30′01″W	Munster	
78	State Bank of Hammond Building	State Bank of Hammond Building	September 27, 1984 (#84001072)	5444-5446 Calumet Ave. 41°36′51″N 87°30′33″W	Hammond	
79	State Street Commercial Historic District	State Street Commercial Historic District	September 17, 1999 (#99001157)	Roughly State St. between Sohl and Bulletin Ave. 41°37′07″N 87°31′00″W	Hammond	
80	Van Buren Terrace Historic District	Van Buren Terrace Historic District	June 22, 2007 (#07000565)	336-354 Van Buren St. 41°36′17″N 87°20′47″W	Gary	
81	West Fifth Avenue Apartments Historic District	West Fifth Avenue Apartments Historic District	May 17, 1984 (#84001076)	Roughly 5th Ave. from Taft to Pierce St. 41°36′06″N 87°21′29″W	Gary	
82	William Whitaker Landscape and House	William Whitaker Landscape and House	September 9, 1999 (#99001107)	472 S. Main St. 41°24′37″N 87°21′50″W	Crown Point	
83	Whiting Memorial Community House	Whiting Memorial Community House	February 8, 1980 (#80000044)	1938 Clark St. 41°40′41″N 87°29′47″W	Whiting	
84	George John Wolf House	George John Wolf House	June 21, 2007 (#07000563)	7220 Forest Ave. 41°34′57″N 87°31′27″W	Hammond	
85	John Wood Old Mill	John Wood Old Mill	October 10, 1975 (#75000026)	East of central Merrillville on State Road 330; 41°28′36″N 87°13′18″W	Merrillville	

== Former listings ==
	Name on the Register	Image	Date listed	Date removed	Location	City or town	Description
1	John Stewart Settlement House		June 7, 1978 (#78000039)	November 4, 1992	1501 Massachusetts St.	Gary	The house has been demolished and was delisted in 1992.
2	Wilbur Wynant House	Wilbur Wynant House	October 18, 2002 (#02001168)	December 15, 2011	600 Fillmore St. 41°36′00″N 87°21′05″W	Gary	A house discovered in 1995 to have been designed by Frank Lloyd Wright. Largely burned in 2006.

== See also ==
- List of National Historic Landmarks in Indiana
- National Register of Historic Places listings in Indiana
- Listings in neighboring counties: Cook (IL), Jasper, Kankakee (IL), Newton, Porter, Will (IL)
- List of Indiana state historical markers in Lake County
