= John Ross Farm =

Historic building in Lake County, Indiana

- U.S. National Register of Historic Places
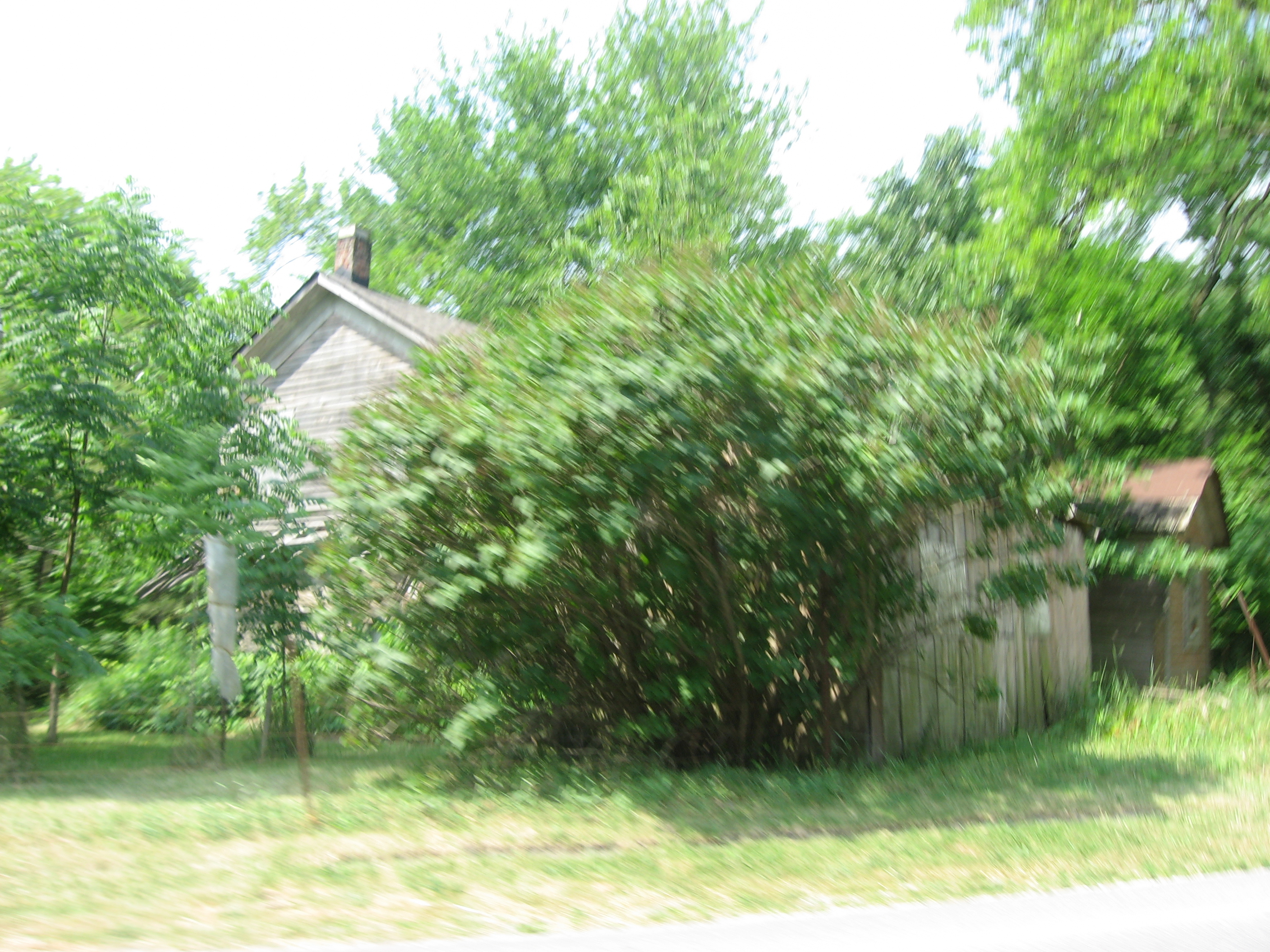
- John Ross Farmhouse

- Location within Indiana Location within the United States
- Location: 3815 East SR 231, Leroy, Indiana
- Nearest city: Leroy, Indiana
- Coordinates: 41°22′14″N 87°17′21″W
- Area: 6 acres (2.4 ha)
- Built: 1850 or 1871?
- NRHP reference No.: 96000283
- Added to NRHP: March 27, 1996

The John Ross Farm is a historic farm located in Leroy, Indiana. It is listed on the National Register of Historic Places (96000283).

The listing included five contributing buildings on 6 acres (2.4 ha): a farmhouse, a hog house, a chicken house, a well house, and a garage.

== See also ==
- National Register of Historic Places listings in Lake County, Indiana
