= Gary Public Schools Memorial Auditorium =

Historic auditorium in Indiana, United States

- U.S. National Register of Historic Places
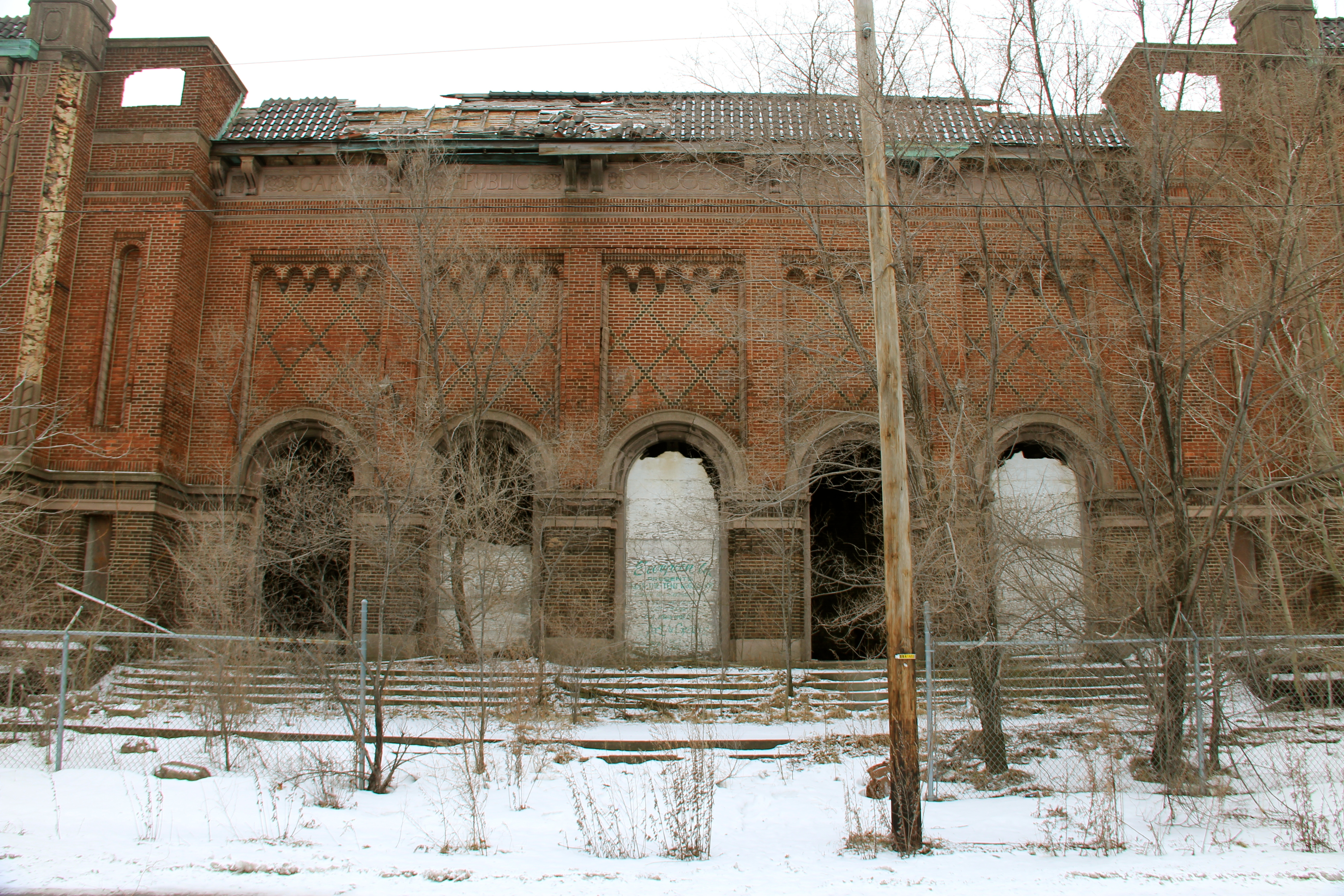
- Gary Public Schools Memorial Auditorium
- Location: 700-734 Massachusetts Street, Gary, Indiana
- Coordinates: 41°35′15″N 87°20′28″W
- Area: less than one acre
- Built: 1927
- Built by: United States Steel Corporation
- Architect: Joseph Wildermuth
- NRHP reference No.: 94001353
- Added to NRHP: 11/25/1994

Gary Public Schools Memorial Auditorium was a historic public facility in Gary, Indiana. The 5,000-seat auditorium was commissioned by the Gary Land Company, part of the United States Steel Corporation and was designed by Joseph Wildermuth. It was dedicated to residents who died fighting in World War I. It was closed in 1972 and the interior was destroyed during a fire in 1997. The building was demolished in 2020.

== See also ==
- National Register of Historic Places listings in Indiana
- National Register of Historic Places listings in Lake County, Indiana
