= D. F. Creighton =

American architect

David F. Creighton (March 1858 – November 30, 1936) was an architect, mechanical engineer, and construction manager from Pennsylvania. He designed worker housing in Gary, Indiana that incorporated concrete and terraces in what was termed terraced housing "based on the Philadelphia plan". It was progressive and "homey" and imaginative in its details. About 77 of the houses that he designed in Gary survive.

== Life and career ==
Creighton was a Pennsylvania native who worked in Allegheny and Ambridge, Pennsylvania until at least 1910. As of 1910, he was employed as a mechanical engineer by the United States Sheet and Tin Plate Company. By 1911, he moved to Gary, Indiana, where he lived until 1920 at least. Between 1910 and 1913, Creighton designed worker housing in Gary for the Sheet and Tin Plate Company. He also worked for a time for the American Bridge Company. By 1930, he returned to Pennsylvania. He died in Pittsburgh in 1936.

== Selected works ==
A number of his works are listed on the National Register of Historic Places.

- American Sheet and Tin Mill Apartment Building, 633 W. 4th Ave., Gary.
- Jackson-Monroe Terraces Historic District, 404-423 Jackson St. and 408-426 Monroe St., Gary.
- Monroe Terrace Historic District, 304-318 Monroe St., Gary.
- Polk Street Terraces Historic District, 404-422 and 437-455 Polk St., Gary.
- Van Buren Terrace Historic District, 336-354 Van Buren St., Gary.

== Gallery ==
Contributions
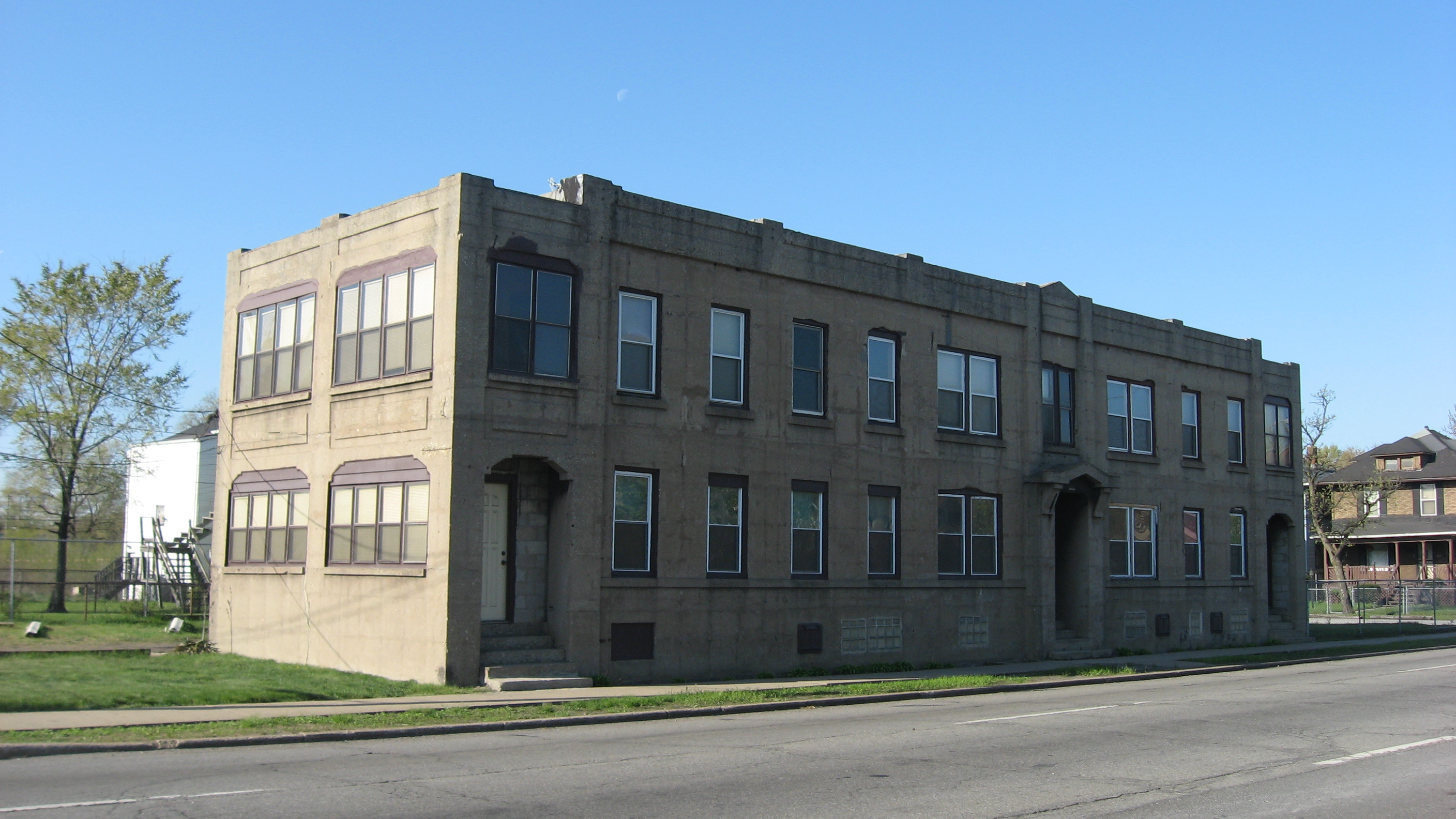
American Sheet and Tin Mill Apartment Building.

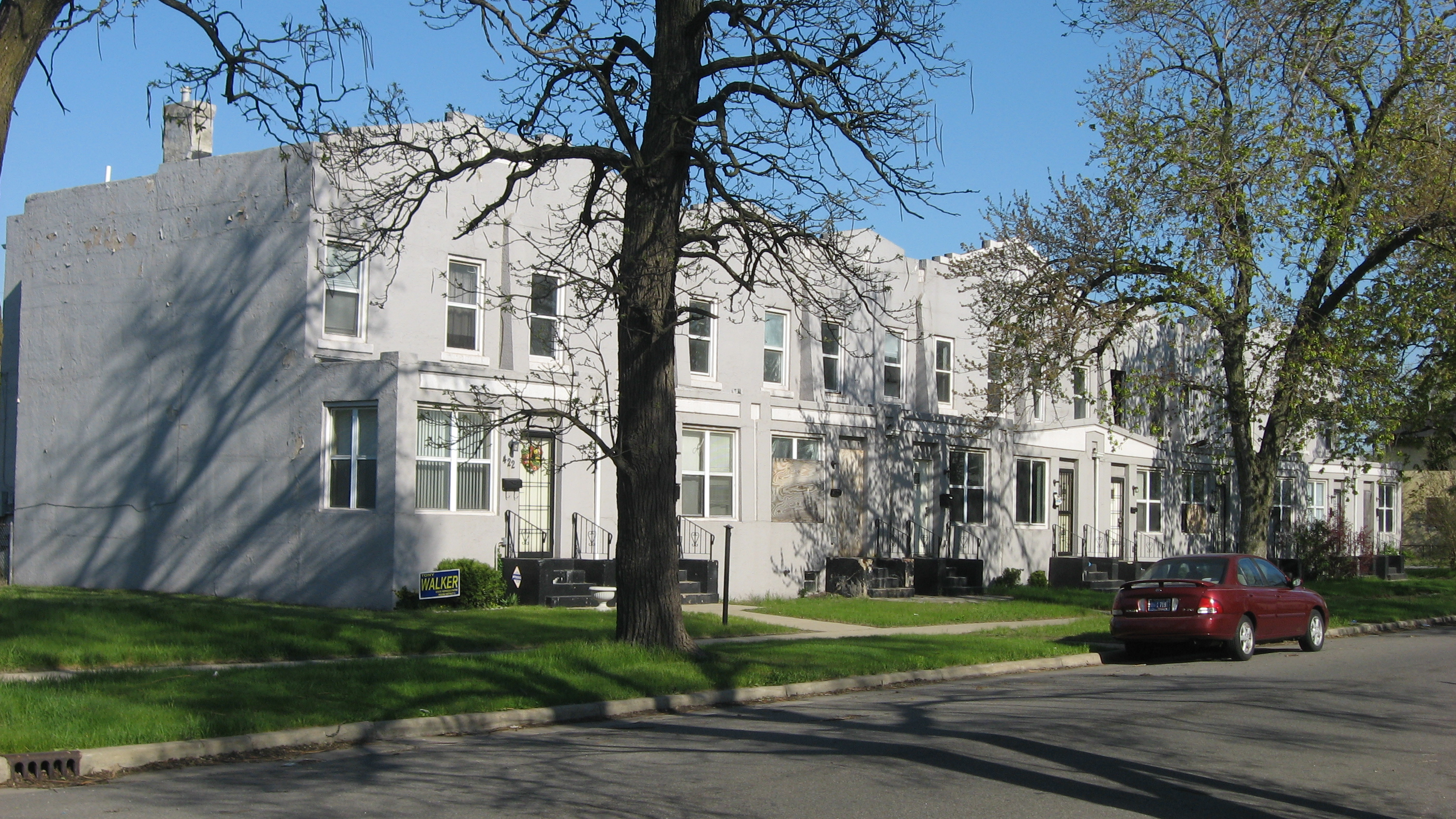
Polk Street Terraces.

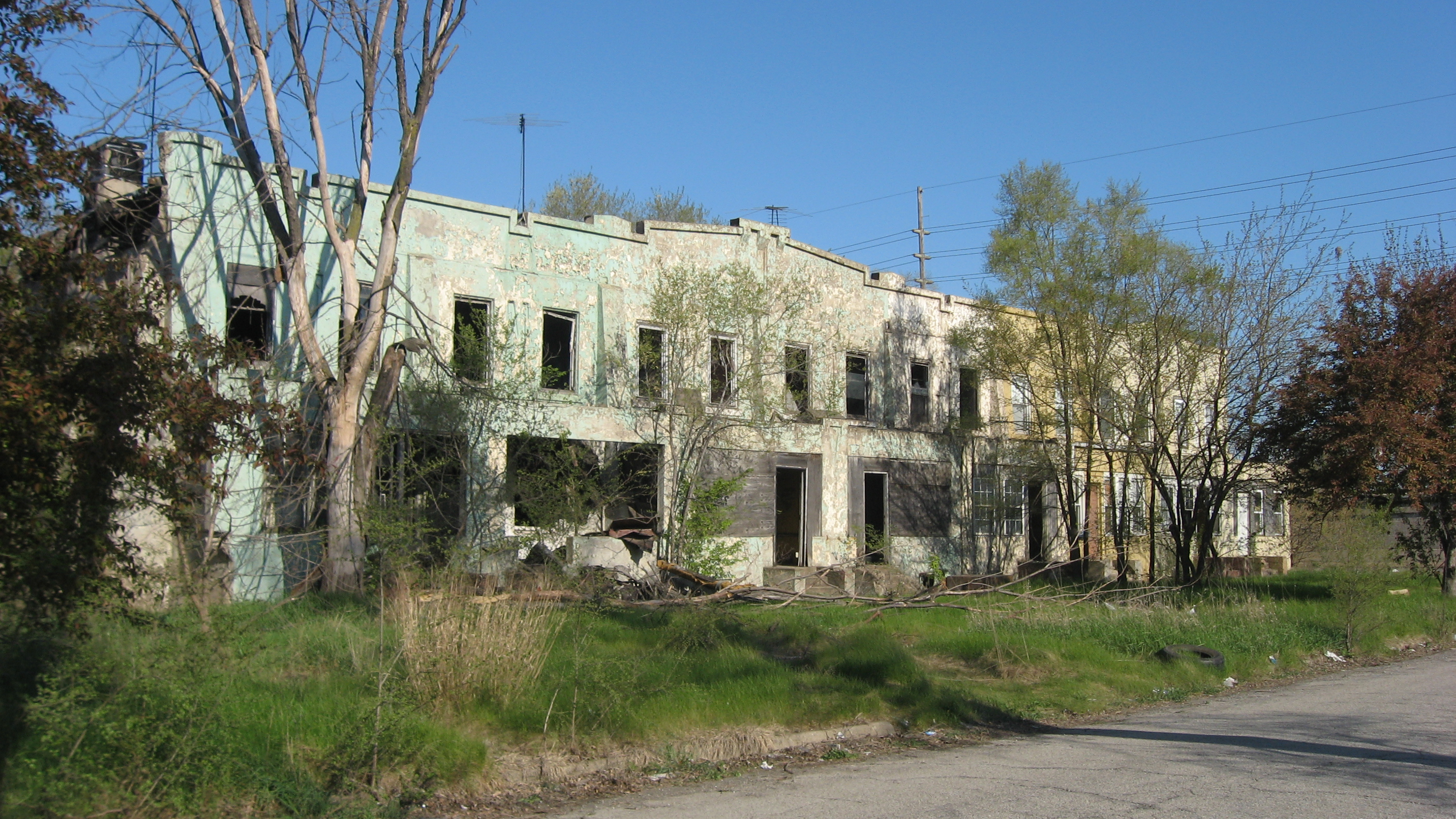
Monroe Terrace.

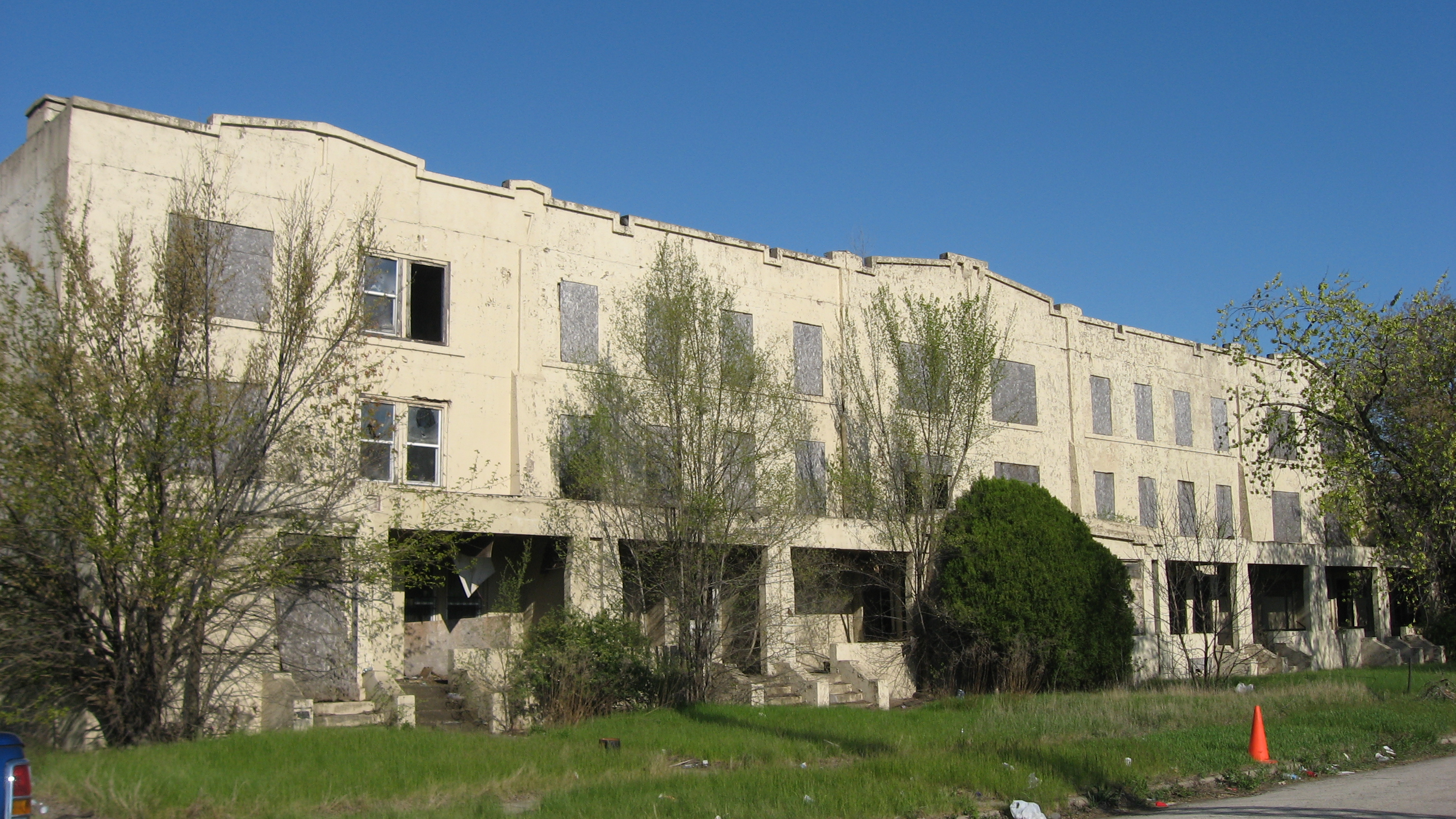
Van Buren Terrace.
