= Crown Point Courthouse Square Historic District =

Historic district in Indiana, United States

- U.S. National Register of Historic Places
- U.S. Historic district
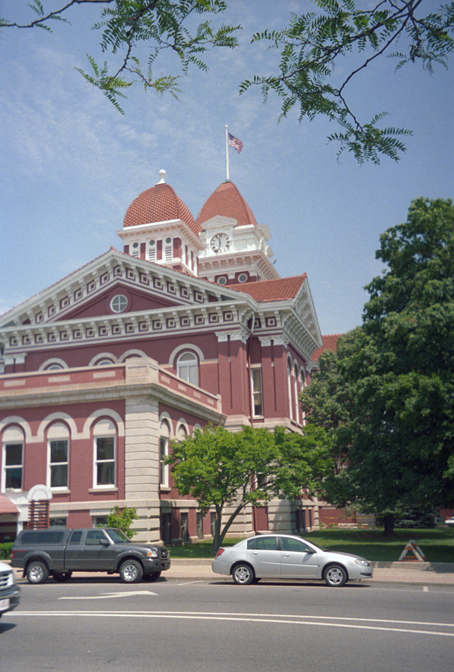
- The former Lake County Courthouse at the center of the district

- Location within Indiana Location within the United States
- Location: Roughly bounded by Clark St., the alley E of Main St., Hack Ct., and Court St. (original); Roughly bounded by Robinson, East, Walnut, and Court Sts. (increase); 208 Main St. (increase II); in Crown Point, Indiana
- Coordinates: 41°25′1″N 87°21′56″W
- Built: 1873 (original)
- Architect: Cochran, J.D.; Beers & Beers et al. (original); Buckley, George (increase II)
- Architectural style: Italianate, Second Empire, et al. (original); Italianate, Queen Anne (increase); Moderne (increase II)
- NRHP reference No.: 04000203, 05001464 and 07000210
- Added to NRHP: March 22, 2004 (original); December 8, 2005; March 29, 2007 (increase II)

Crown Point Courthouse Square Historic District is a historic district in Crown Point, Indiana, that dates back to 1873. It was listed on the National Register of Historic Places in 2004. Its boundaries were changed in 2005, and it was increased in 2007 to include a Moderne architecture building at 208 Main Street. The late nineteenth- and early twentieth-century commercial and public buildings represent a period of economic and political growth. The Lake County Courthouse stands in the center of the district. Designed by architect John C. Cochrane in 1878, this brick building is a combination of Romanesque Revival and Classical styles. Enlarged in 1909 with the addition of north and south wings, designed by Beers and Beers. Continued growth in the county required second enlargement in 1928. This local landmark was placed in the National Register of Historic Places in 1973.

The commercial buildings surrounding the courthouse include examples of the most common styles of the late nineteenth century. The I.O.O.F. Building and the commercial buildings at 103 West Joliet Street and 102 South Main Street are Italianate Commercial with decorative pressed-metal details. The Allman Block is the Romanesque Revival style on the square. These structures were built from 1880 to 1891.

The early twentieth-century architecture include the 1908 Carnegie Library and the Masonic Lodge next to each other on South Main. The Masonic Lodge is a Colonial Revival-style building built c. 1920. Across Main Street are two other examples of the Colonial Revival, the Lake County Criminal Court Building and the Community Center, also from the 1920s.

The Lake County Sheriff's House and Jail, built in 1882, is Second Empire style. These are the first permanent buildings for this purpose. The jail was expanded in 1910. The bulk of the existing two-story building was completed in 1934. This is the jail from which John Dillinger escaped in March 1934 while being held on murder charges. The jail was closed in 1974 and placed in the National Register of Historic Places in 1989.

== Significant buildings ==
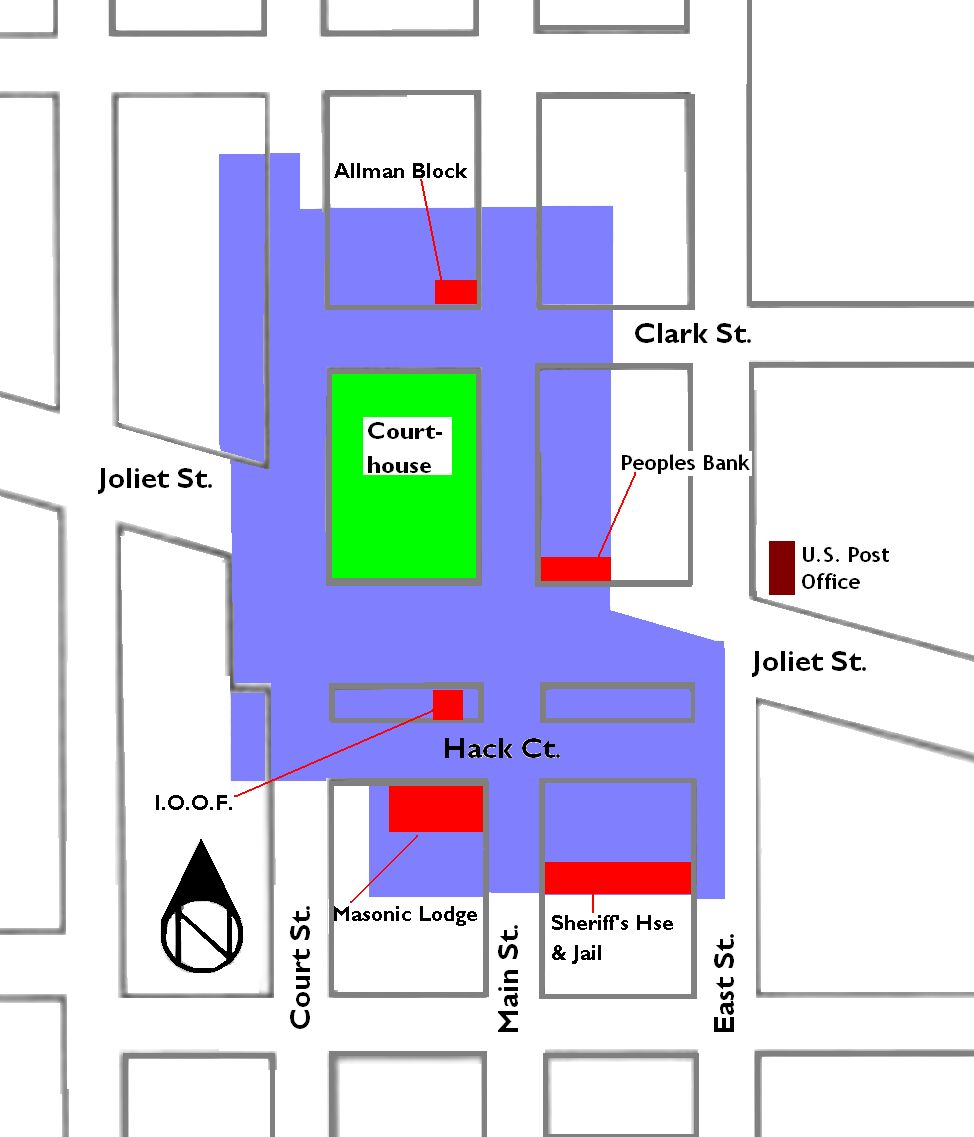
Crown Point Courthouse Square Historic District, Crown Point, Indiana.

All structures are historically contributing towards the Historic District Status, unless otherwise noted. An ‘O’ rating signifies that the structure had enough historic or architectural significance to be considered for individual listing in the National Register of Historic Places. The ‘N’ rating signifies that the structure is above average and may, with further investigation be eligible for an individual listing. The ‘C’ or contributing rating signifies that the structure meet the basic inventory qualifications, but fails to meet individual merit, but in combination with other closely placed similar structures warrants inclusion in an historic district.

Clark St (North Side)

- 106 Commercial Bldg, Vernacular c. 1890.

Joliet St (South Side)

- 115 Commercial Bldg, Vernacular c. 1920
- 113 Commercial Bldg, Vernacular c. 1900
- 111 Commercial Bldg, Minas Bldg c. 1937
- 107 Commercial Bldg, I.O.O.F, Italianate c. 1880 (N)
- 105 Commercial Bldg, Italianate 1878
- 103 Commercial Bldg, Italianate 1878

Hark Court (South Side)

- 105-107 Commercial Bldg, Vernacular, c. 1900

North Court St (West Side)

- 1 Commercial Bldg, Vernacular, c. 1890
- 5 Commercial Bldg, Italianate, c. 1890
- 9 Commercial Bldg, Vernacular, c. 1920
- 13 Commercial Bldg, Vernacular, c. 1920
- 15 Commercial Bldg, Vernacular, c. 1920
- 19 Theater, Art Deco, c. 1940
- 21 Stan-Register Paper Building, Vernacular, c. 1910
- 103 Community Center, Colonial Revival, c. 1925
- 105 Solon Robinson Historical Marker, 1834

South Main St (West Side)

- Crown Point Carnegie Library Historical Marker, 1908
- 223 Crown Point Carnegie Library, Colonial Revival, 1908
- 225 Masonic Temple, Colonial Revival, c. 1920 (N)
- 209-211 Commercial Bldg, Vernacular, 1930
- 99 Lake County Courthouse
- Lake County Courthouse Historical Marker, 1874

North Main St (West Side)

- 1 Allman Block, Romanesque Revival, 1891, (Amos Allman Building)(N)
- 103-105 Commercial Bldg., Vernacular, c. 1920
- 113 Commercial Bldg, Italianate, 1896
- 116 Commercial Bldg, Vernacular, c. 1910

South Main St (East Side)

- Lake County Sheriff's House & Jail Historical Marker, 1882
- 212 Lake County Sheriff's House, Second Empire, 1882 (O)
- 230 Lake County Criminal Court, Colonial Revival, c. 1920 (O)
- 208-210 Commercial Bldg, Vernacular, c. 1900
- 204 Commercial Bldg, Vernacular, c. 1920
- 138 Bank, Neoclassical, c. 1915 (O)
- 136-132 Commercial Bldg, Italianate, 1878 (N)
- 120 Commercial Bldg, Italianate, 1881
- 112 Commercial Bldg, Italianate, c. 1880
- 110 Commercial Bldg, Gable-front, c. 1860
- 108 Commercial Bldg, Vernacular, c. 1910
- 102 Commercial Bldg, Italianate, c. 1880
- 100 Commercial Bldg, Italianate, c. 1880

North Main St (East Side)

- 108-110 Commercial Bldg, Vernacular, c. 1890
- 116 Bastiani Building, Vernacular 1926

South East St (West Side)

- 213 Lake County Jail, Vernacular, 1934, (O) NR
- 211 Industrial Bldg, Vernacular, c. 1930
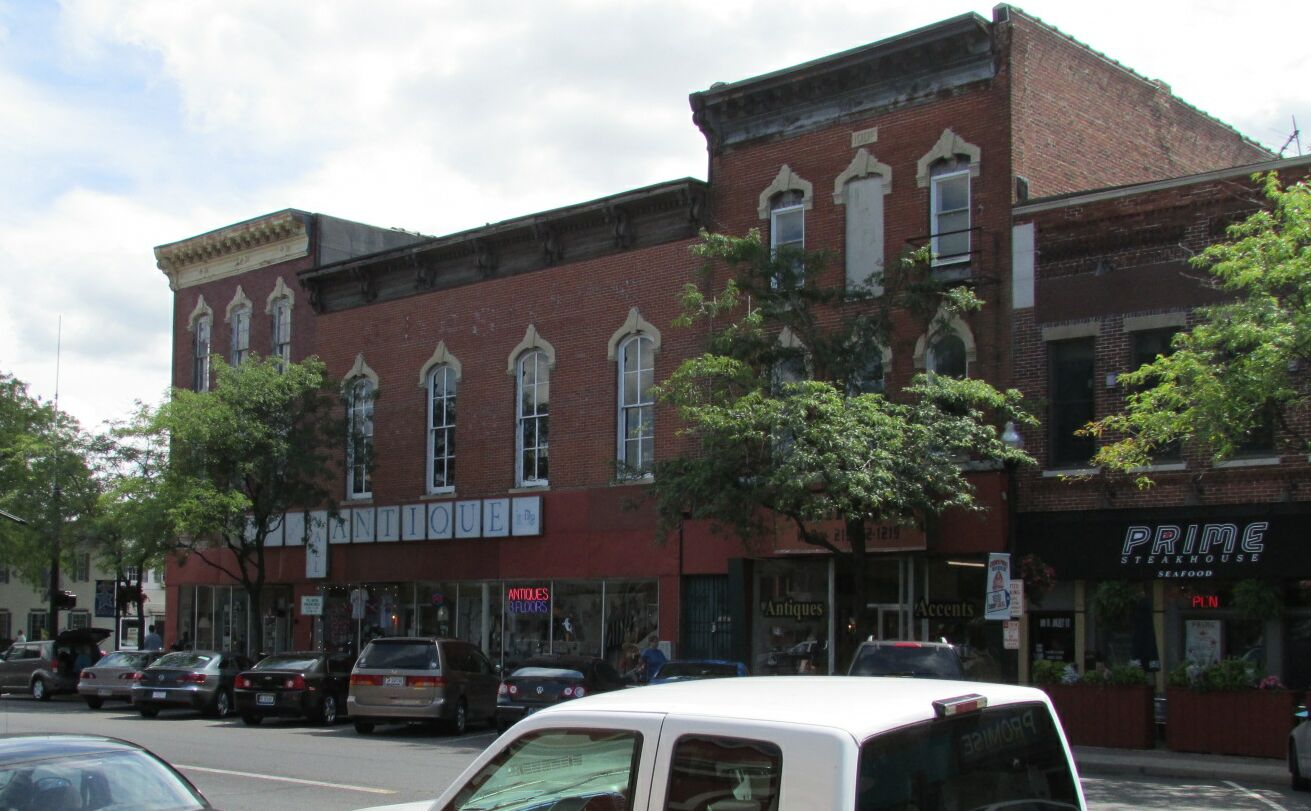
107 Joliet St - Commercial Bldg, I.O.O.F, Italianate c. 1880 (N)

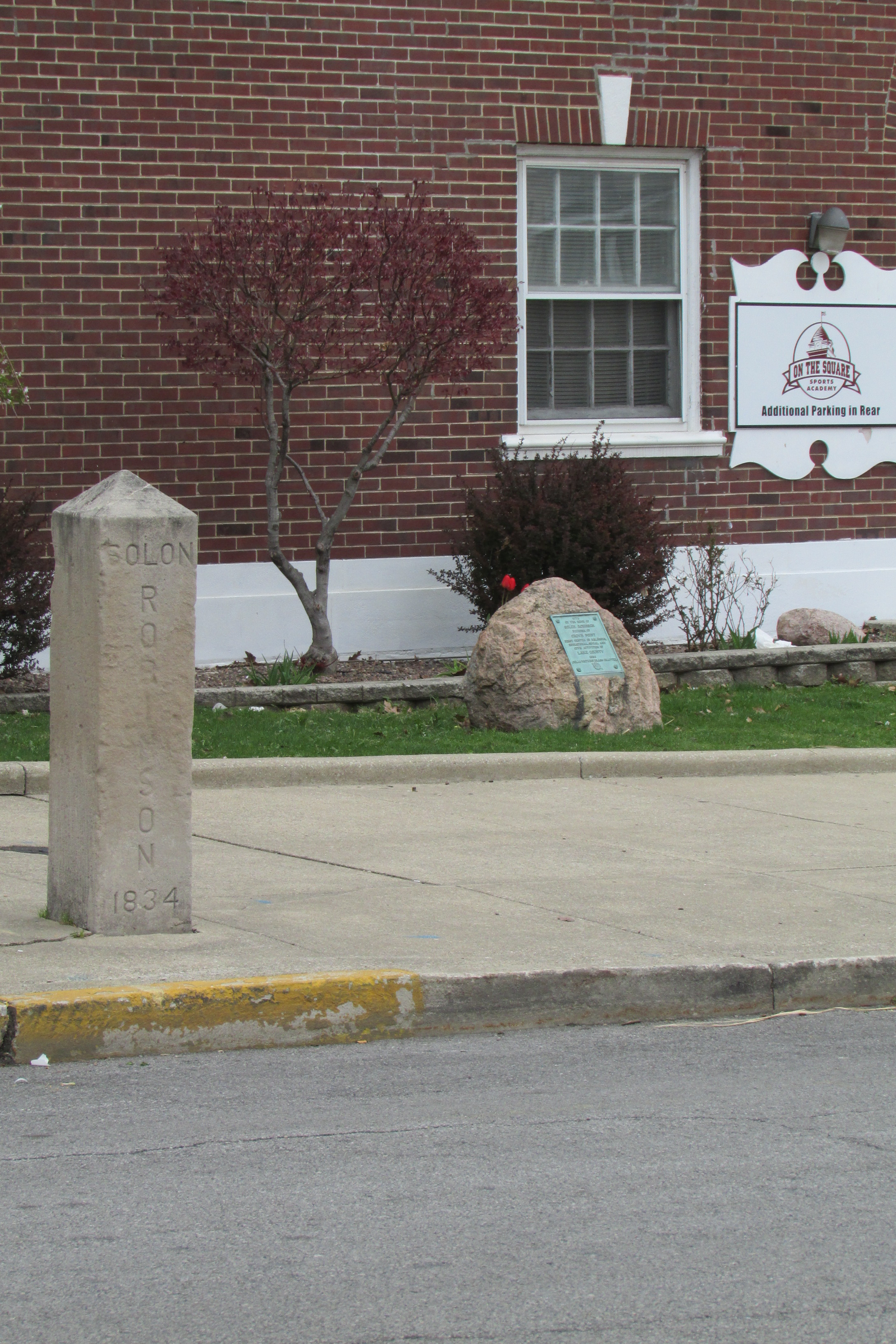
105 Solon Robinson Historical Marker, 1834

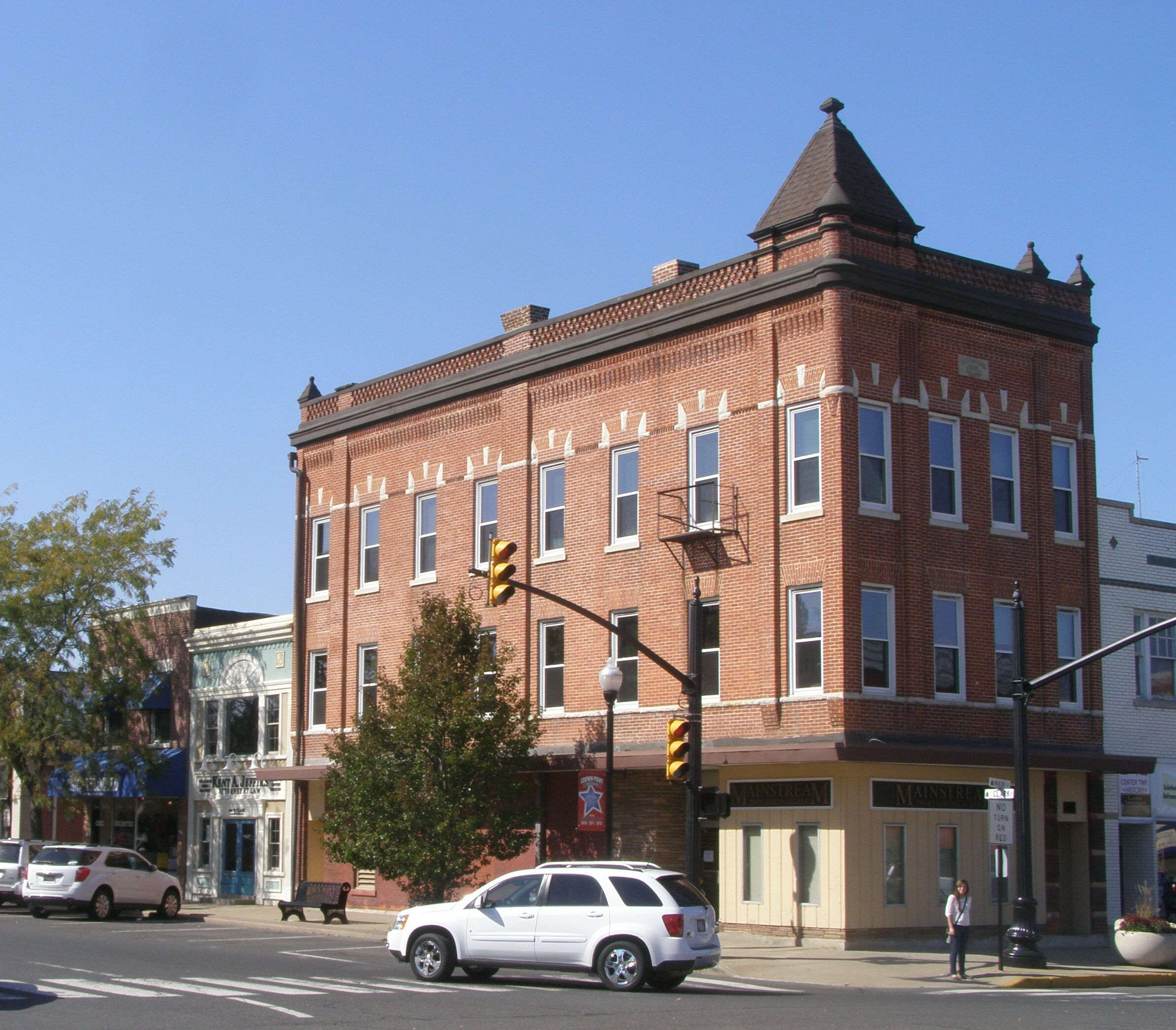
1 N. Main - Allman Block, Romanesque Revival, 1891, (Amos Allman Building)(N)

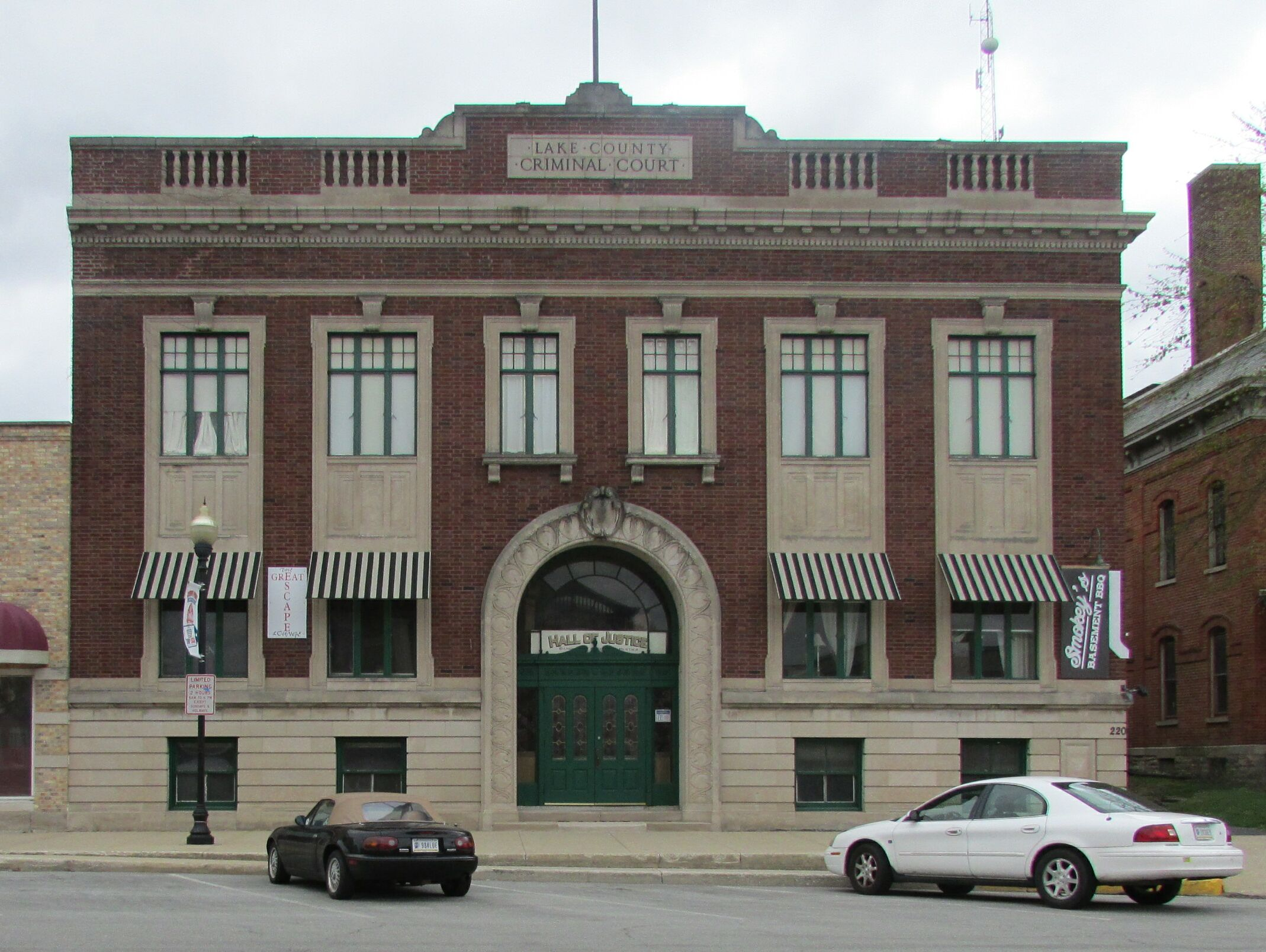
230 S. Main - Lake County Criminal Court, Colonial Revival, c. 1920 (O)

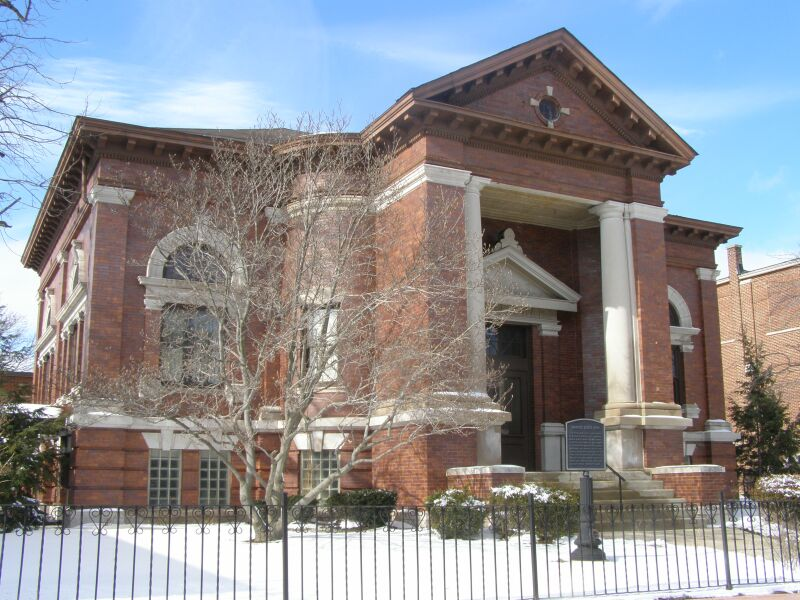
223 S. Main - Crown Point Carnegie Library, Colonial Revival, 1908

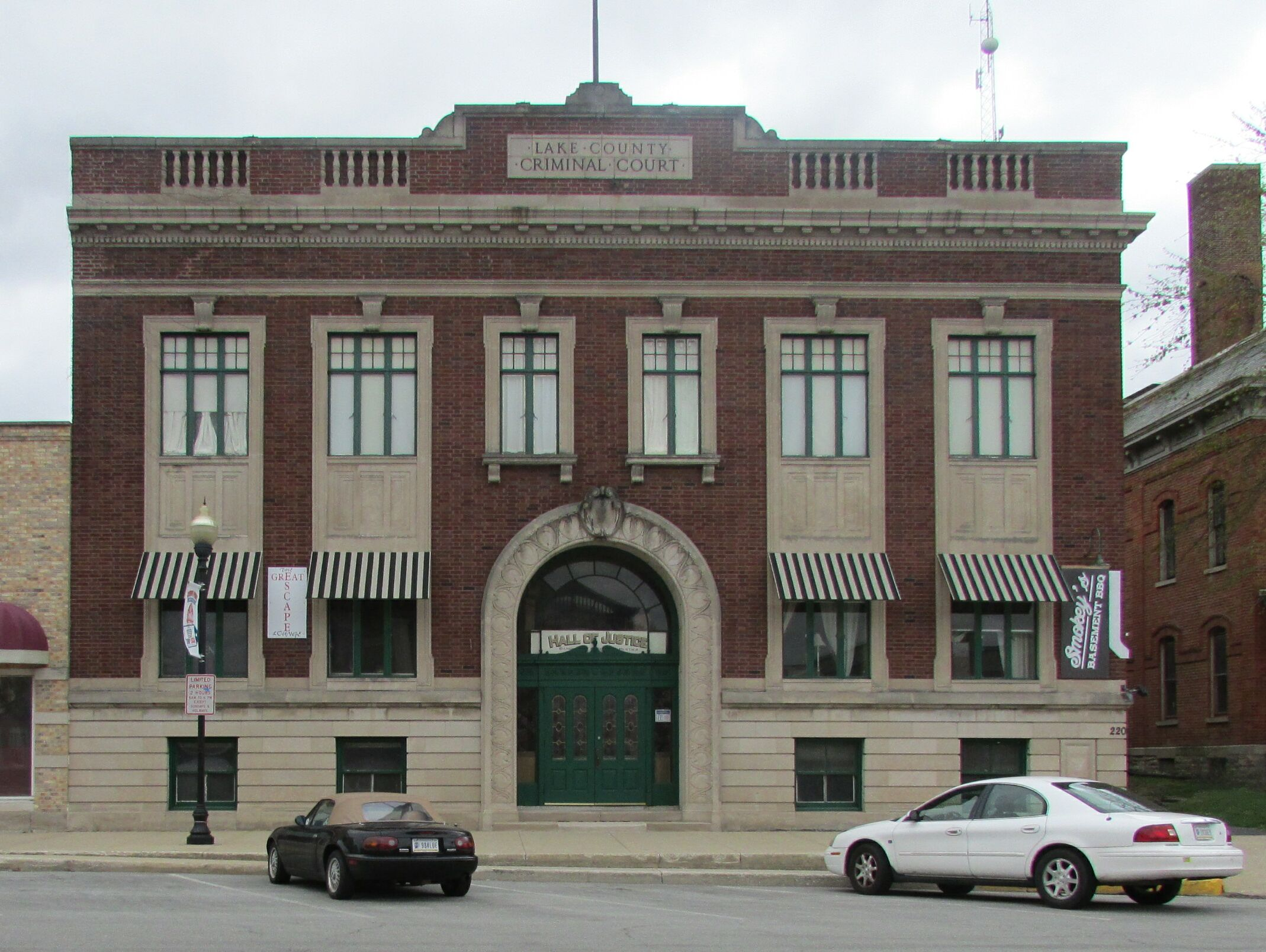
225 S. Main - Masonic Temple, Colonial Revival, c. 1920 (N)

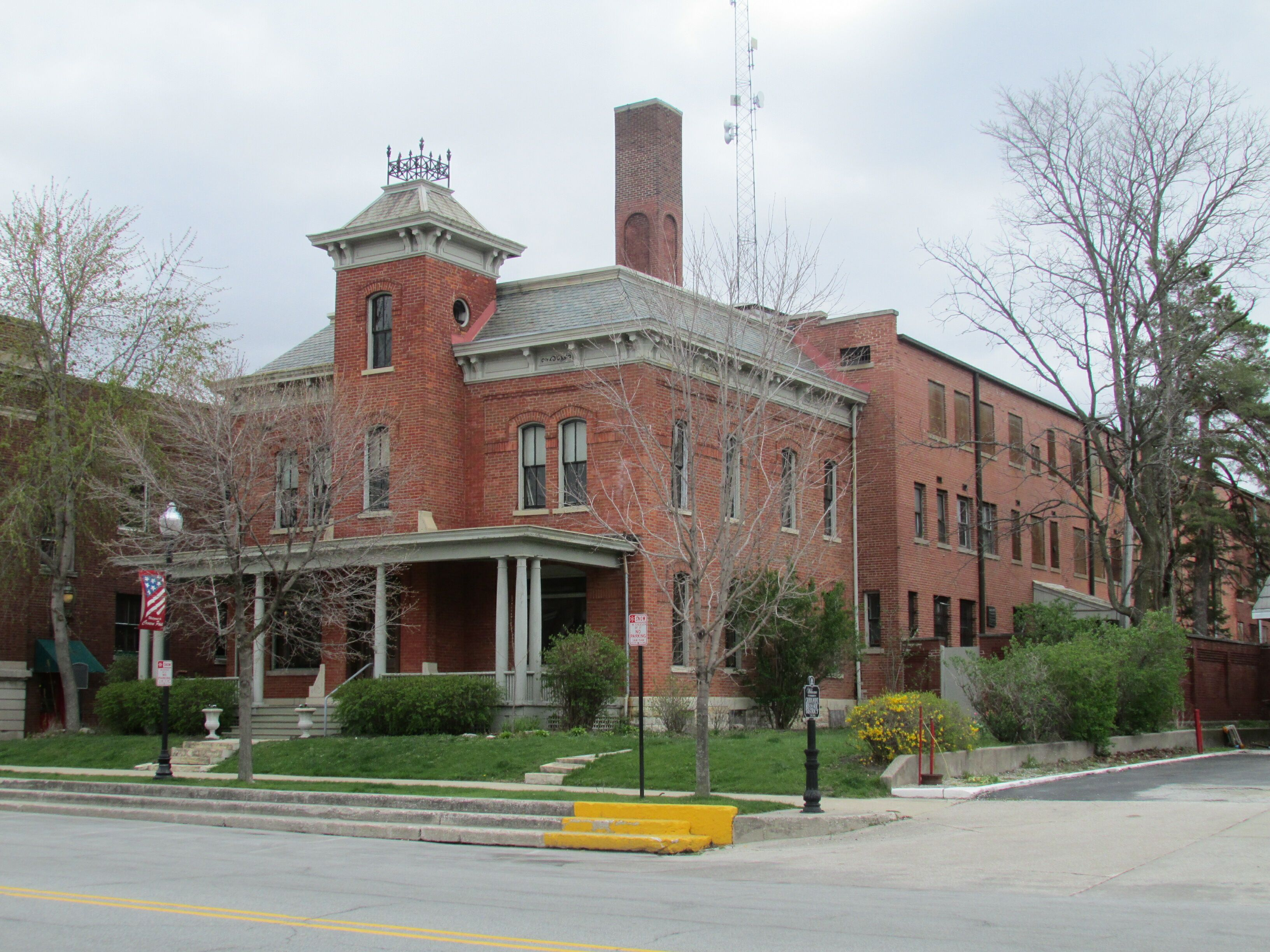
212 S. Main - Lake County Sheriff's House, Second Empire, 1882 (O) with the 213 S. Main - Lake County Jail, Vernacular, 1934, (O) NR in back.

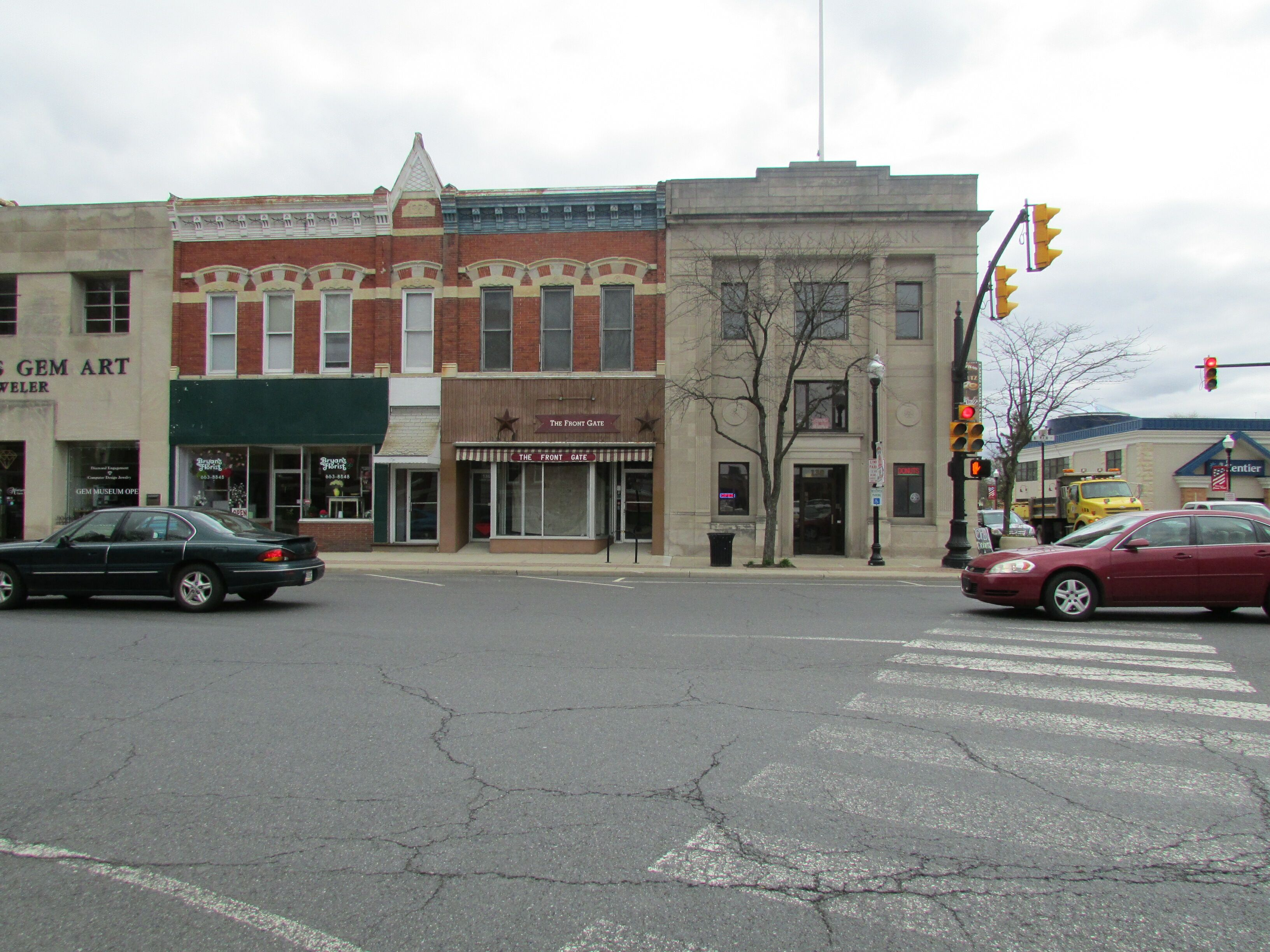
138 S. Main – Peoples Bank, Neoclassical, c. 1915 (O)

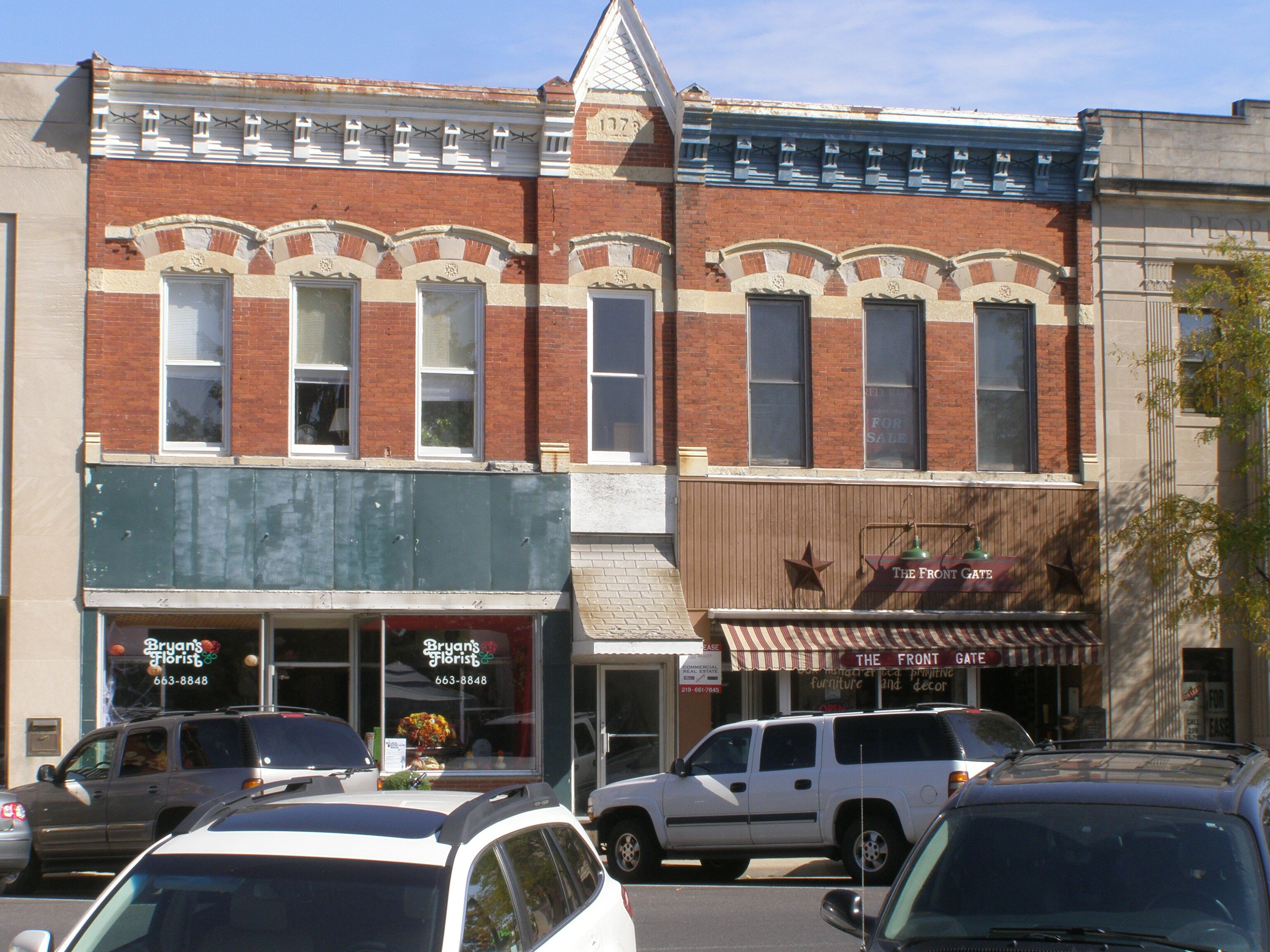
136-132 S. Main - Commercial Bldg, Italianate, 1878 (N)
