= Griffith State Bank =

Historic building in Griffith, Indiana

- U.S. National Register of Historic Places
- Location: 101 East Main Street, Griffith, Indiana
- Coordinates: 41°31′51″N 87°25′33″W
- Area: less than one acre
- Built: 1920
- Architectural style: Colonial Revival
- NRHP reference No.: 100004050
- Added to NRHP: June 3, 2019

The Griffith State Bank (sometimes referred to as Sam Woods-Griffith Public Library) is a historic building in Griffith, Indiana built in 1920. The bank closed in 1933 and in 1940 the building became a public library, which closed in 1967. It is listed on the National Register of Historic Places (100004050).

== See also ==
- National Register of Historic Places listings in Indiana
- National Register of Historic Places listings in Lake County, Indiana
