= Polk Street Terraces Historic District =

Historic district in Indiana, United States

- U.S. National Register of Historic Places
- U.S. Historic district
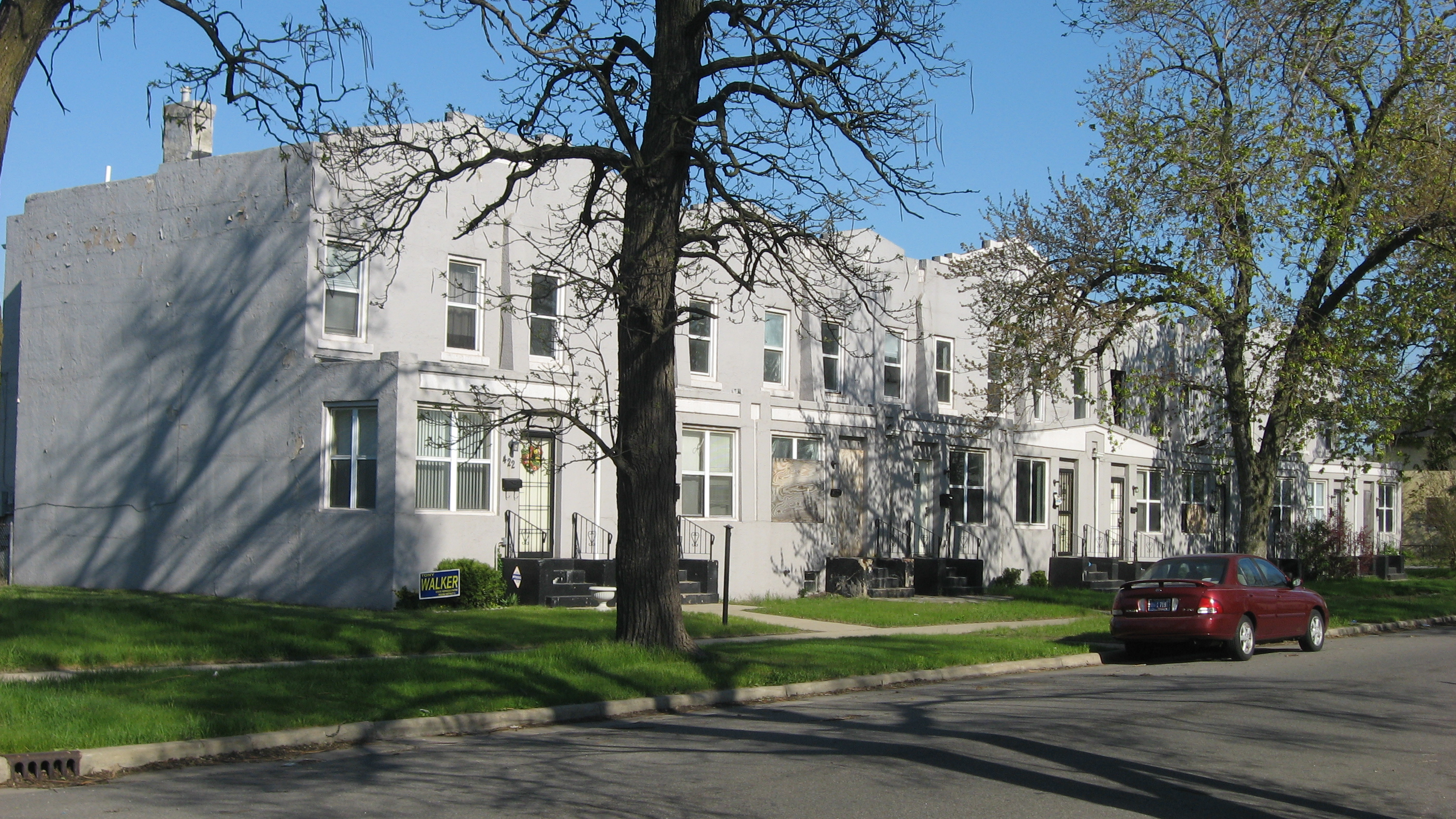
- Polk Street Terraces Historic District, April 2012

- Location within Indiana Location within the United States
- Location: 404-422 and 437-455 Polk St., Gary, Indiana
- Coordinates: 41°36′13″N 87°20′59″W
- Area: less than one acre
- Built: 1910
- Built by: United States Sheet & Tin Plate Co.
- Architect: Creighton, D.F.
- Architectural style: Bungalow/craftsman
- MPS: Concrete in Steel City: The Edison Concept Houses of Gary Indiana MS
- NRHP reference No.: 09000430
- Added to NRHP: June 17, 2009

Polk Street Terraces Historic District is a national historic district located in the First Subdivision of Gary, Indiana. The district encompasses 20 contributing buildings in a residential section of Gary. The buildings were designed by D. F. Creighton and built by the United States Sheet & Tin Plate Co. They were built starting in 1910 and are examples of the Edison Concept Houses that were designed, patented, and promoted by inventor Thomas Edison. The houses reflect Bungalow / American Craftsman design elements.

It was listed in the National Register of Historic Places in 2009.

== See also ==
- American Sheet and Tin Mill Apartment Building
