= American Sheet and Tin Mill Apartment Building =

- U.S. National Register of Historic Places
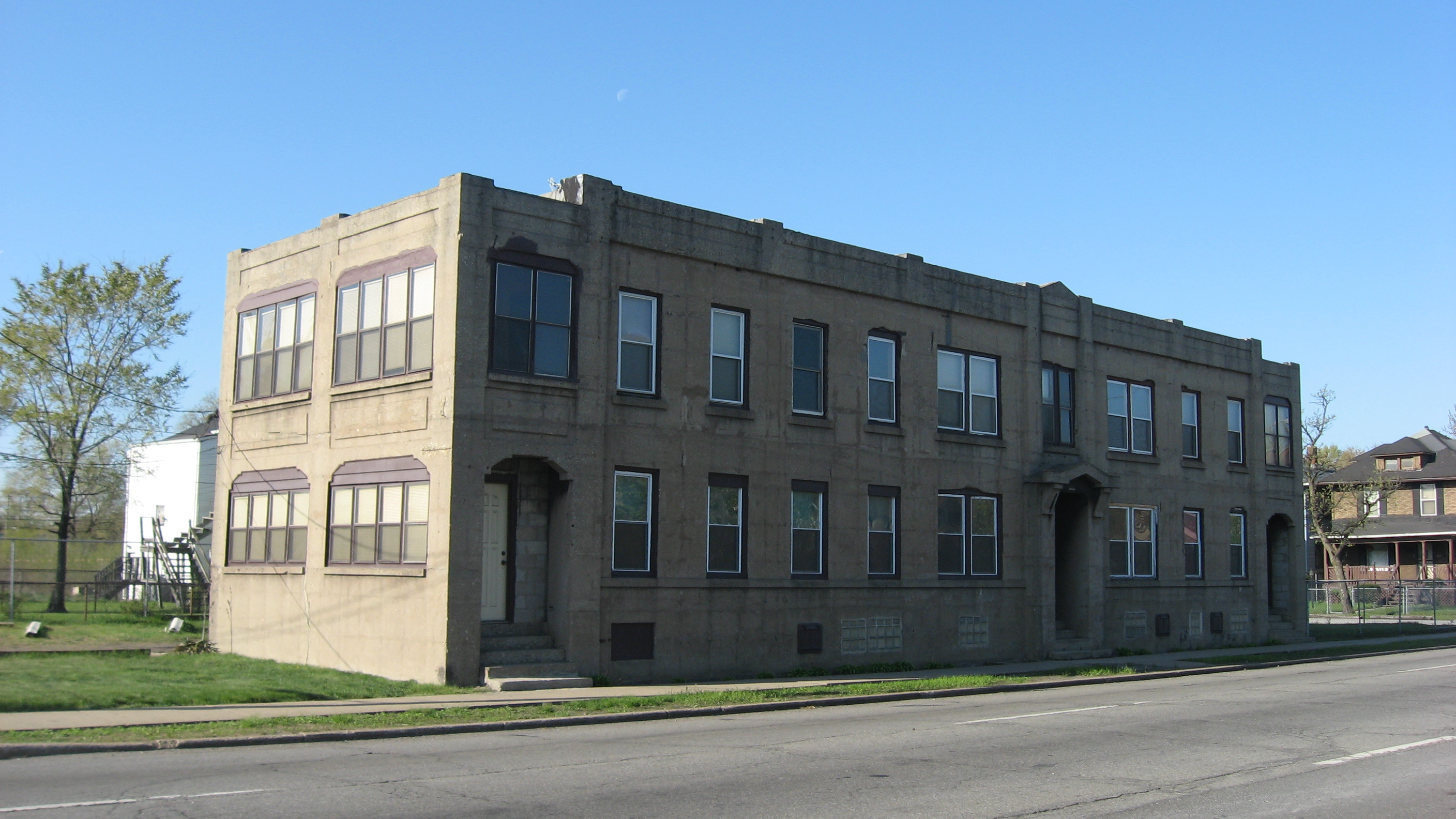
- American Sheet and Tin Mill Apartment Building in Gary, Indiana

- Location within Indiana Location within the United States
- Location: 633 W. 4th Avenue; Gary, Indiana
- Coordinates: 41°36′13″N 87°20′43″W
- Area: less than one acre
- Built: 1910
- Architects: D.F. Creighton; United States Sheet & Tin Plate Co.
- Architectural style: Poured concrete
- MPS: Concrete in Steel City: The Edison Concept Houses of Gary Indiana MS
- NRHP reference No.: 09000427
- Added to NRHP: June 17, 2009

The American Sheet and Tin Mill Apartment Building, one of the Edison Concept Houses, is a historic building at 633 West 4th Avenue in Gary, Indiana. The building was designed by D. F. Creighton and constructed in 1910. It was added to the National Register of Historic Places on June 17, 2009. It was built by the United States Sheet & Tin Plate Co.

Thousands moved to Gary in the early 1900s for work in the burgeoning steel industry. Providing housing quickly and affordably, Thomas Edison's 1906 proposal of pouring a concrete mixture into a single mold for the façades, roof, stairs, walls, and other parts of a house was adopted for company housing (Edison was not directly involved).

== See also ==
- Polk Street Terraces Historic District
- National Register of Historic Places listings in Lake County, Indiana
