= Lake County Sheriff's House and Jail =

Historic government buildings in Indiana, United States

- U.S. National Register of Historic Places
- U.S. Historic district – Contributing property
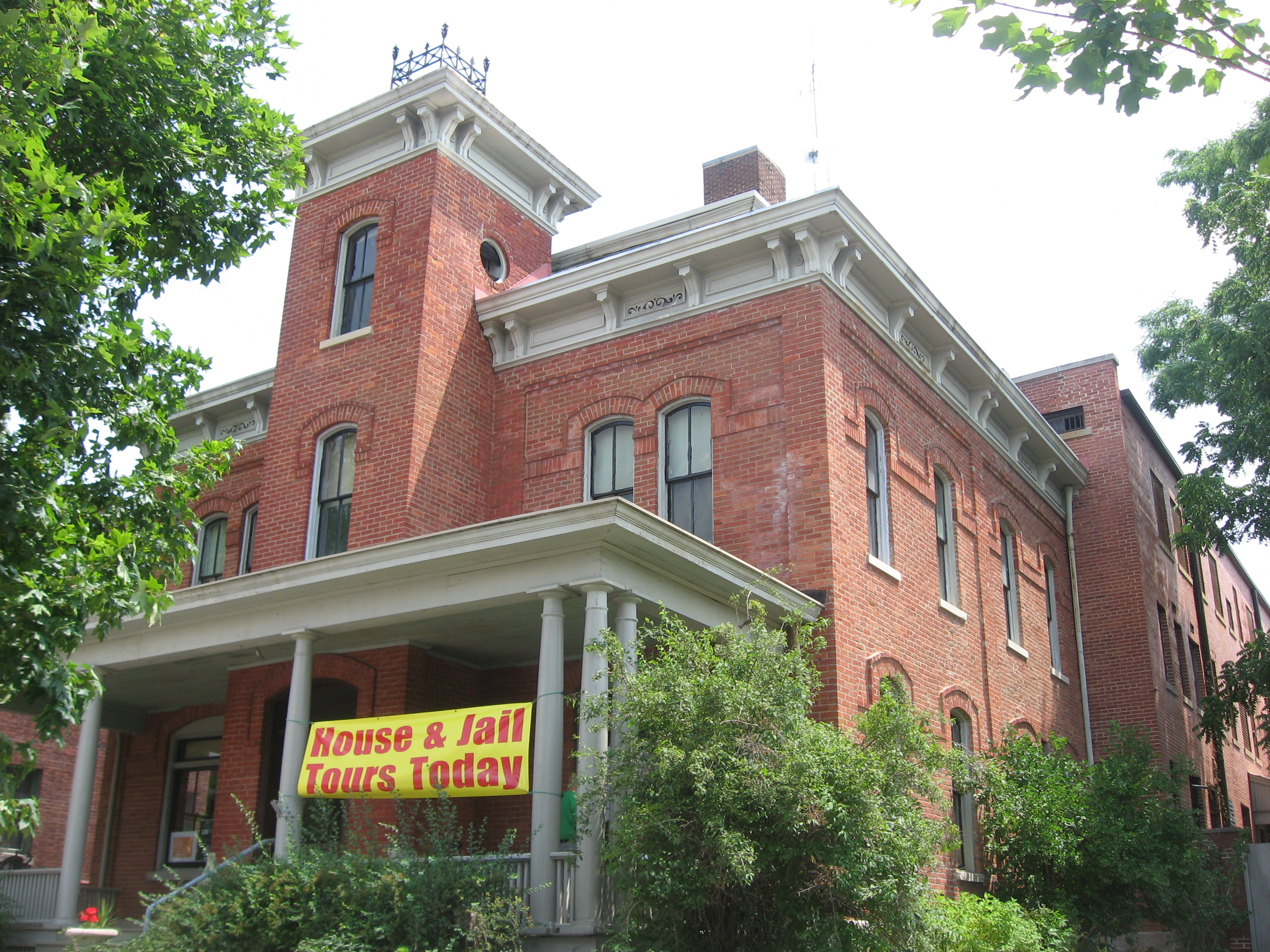
- Lake County Sheriff's House and Jail, June 2012

- Location within Indiana Location within the United States
- Interactive map showing the location for Lake County Sheriff's House and Jail
- Location: 232 S. Main St., Crown Point, Indiana
- Coordinates: 41°24′57″N 87°21′51″W
- Area: less than one acre
- Built: 1882
- Architectural style: Second Empire
- NRHP reference No.: 88003039
- Added to NRHP: January 4, 1989

Lake County Sheriff's House and Jail, also known as the Sheriff's House, is a historic jail and residence located at 226 South Main Street in Crown Point, Indiana, United States. It was built in 1882, and is a two-story, Second Empire style brick building. It has a three-story projecting tower and a mansard roof. It features a one-story, flat roofed porch with Tuscan order columns added about 1890. The building remained in use as a residence until 1958 and as a jail until 1974. The building is maintained and open to the public by the Old Sheriff's House Foundation.

It was added to the National Register of Historic Places on January 4, 1989. It is part of the Crown Point Courthouse Square Historic District.
