= List of Indiana state historical markers in Lake County =

Location of Lake County in Indiana

This is a list of the Indiana state historical markers in Lake County.

This is intended to be a complete list of the official state historical markers placed in Lake County, Indiana, United States by the Indiana Historical Bureau. The locations of the historical markers and their latitude and longitude coordinates are included below when available, along with their names, years of placement and topics as recorded by the Historical Bureau. There are 14 historical markers located in Lake County.

== Historical markers ==
Marker title	Image	Year placed	Location	Topics
First Physician		1949	2985 West 73rd Place in Merrillville; 41°29′6″N 87°22′23″W	Science, Medicine, and Inventions, Underground Railroad, African American
Great Sauk (Sac) Trail (east–west through this point)		1966	Along Van Buren Street at its junction with West 73rd Avenue/Old U.S. Route 30/Lincoln Highway on a traffic median east of Calumet Cemetery and west of Broadway (State Road 53) in Merrillville; 41°29′9″N 87°20′46.2″W	Transportation, American Indian/Native American
St. John's Lutheran Church Tolleston		1976	2235 West 10th Avenue in Gary; 41°35′34″N 87°21′57″W	Religion, Immigration and Ethnic Groups
Dutch in the Calumet Region		1992	8941 Kleinman Road in Highland; 41°33′2″N 87°26′14″W	Immigration and Ethnic Groups, Agriculture
St. John Township School, District #2		1995	1515 Joliet Street/Lincoln Highway/U.S. Route 30, east of St. John Road at the St. John Township Community Center in Schererville; 41°29′27.6″N 87°29′17.4″W	Education
The Lincoln Highway – The "Ideal Section"		1996	Northeastern corner of the junction of Joliet Street/U.S. Route 30 and Janice Drive in Schererville; 41°29′27.6″N 87°28′52.5″W	Transportation
Froebel School		2014	15th Avenue and Madison Street in Gary; 41°35′16.9″N 87°20′29.9″W	Education
Stewart Settlement House		2014	1501 East Massachusetts Street in Gary; 41°35′16.0″N 87°20′06.2″W	African American
Rep. Katie Hall (1938–2012), Origin of Dr MLK Day Law		2019	1927 Madison St., Gary; 41°35′00″N 87°20′29″W	African American; Politics
City Church		2019	577 Washington St., Gary; 41°36′01″N 87°20′18″W	Religion, African American, Immigration, Business, Industry and Labor
Mt Zion MB Church		2019	1047 Kenwood St., Hammond; 41°35′56″N 87°30′08″W	Religion, African American
Gary Roosevelt High School		2020	730 W 25th Ave, Gary; 41°34′24.3″N 87°20′42.5″W	Education, African American
Indiana University Northwest		2021	Indiana University Northwest, Anderson Library Conference Center, 3400 Broadway, Gary; 41°33′20″N 87°20′17″W	Education & Library
Hagenbeck-Wallace Circus / 1918 Circus Train Wreck		2022	Ivanhoe South Nature Preserve, Colfax St., just off US 12/20 near Cline Avenue, Gary; 41°35′51.8″N 87°24′48″W	Transportation; Arts & Culture

== See also ==
- List of Indiana state historical markers
- National Register of Historic Places listings in Lake County, Indiana
