= Gary City Center Historic District =

Historic district in Indiana, United States

- U.S. National Register of Historic Places
- U.S. Historic district
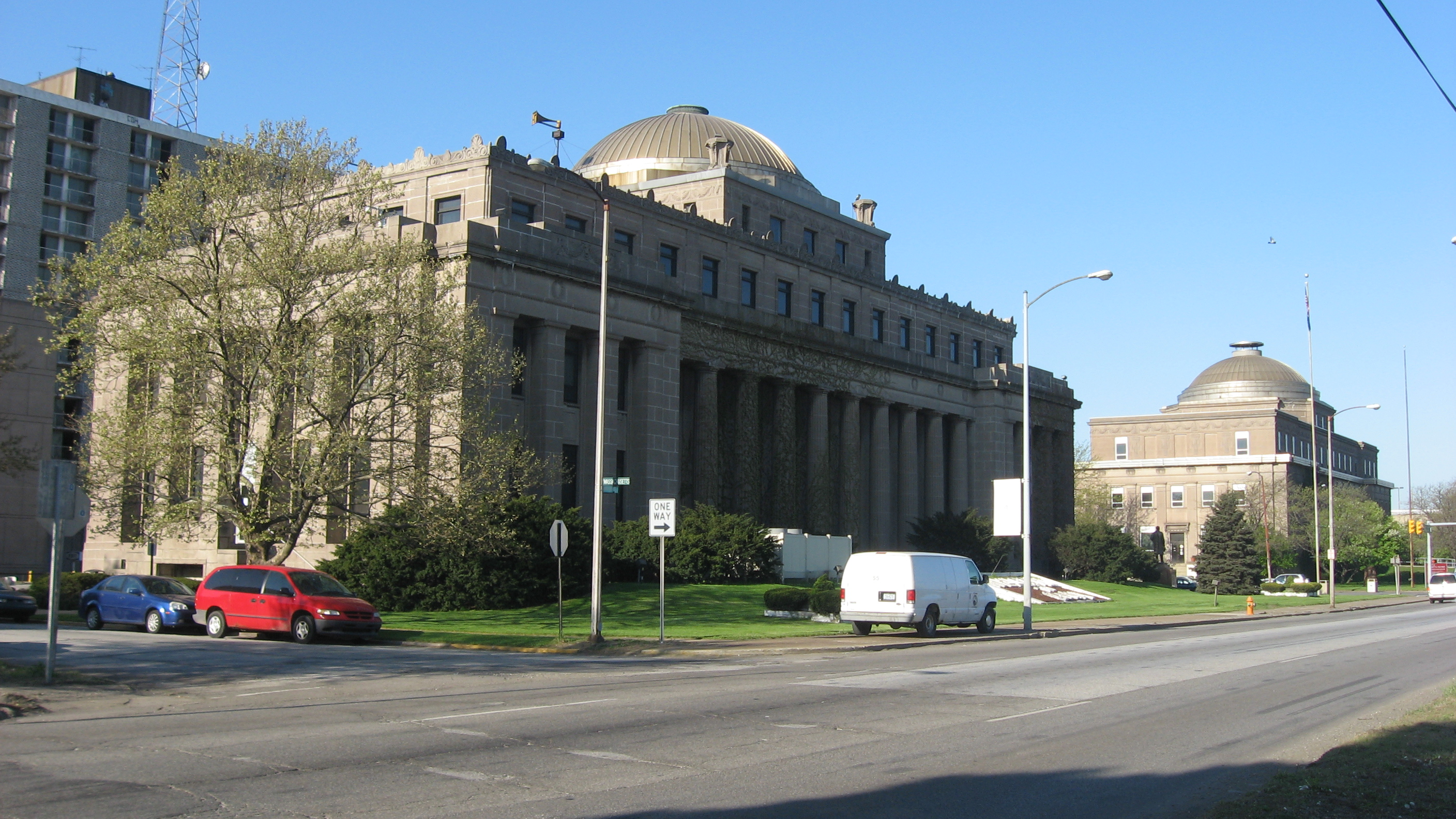
- City Hall and Superior Courthouse, April 2012

- Location within Indiana Location within the United States
- Location: Roughly, Broadway from the Chicago, South Shore and South Bend RR tracks to 9th Ave., Gary, Indiana
- Coordinates: 41°36′01″N 87°20′13″W
- Area: 55 acres (22 ha)
- Architect: Cheney, Howard, et al.; Eberson, John, et al.
- Architectural style: Tudor Revival, Classical Revival, Late 19th And Early 20th Century American Movements
- NRHP reference No.: 94001352
- Added to NRHP: November 25, 1994

Gary City Center Historic District is a national historic district located at Gary, Indiana. The district encompasses 60 contributing buildings and 2 contributing sites in Downtown Gary. It developed between about 1906 and 1944 includes notable examples of Tudor Revival, Late Gothic Revival, and Classical Revival style architecture. Notable buildings include the City Hall and Superior Courthouse (1927), the second Gary Land Company Building (c. 1907), Olympic Hotel (c. 1928, demolished), the "Modern Apartments" (c. 1929), Dalton Apartments (c. 1929), Gary State Bank Building (1929), Hotel Gary (1926), City Methodist Church (1926, ruined), YWCA Building (1922), and former U.S. Post Office Building (1936).

It was listed in the National Register of Historic Places in 1994.
