= Crawford-Winslow House =

Historic house in Indiana, United States

- U.S. National Register of Historic Places
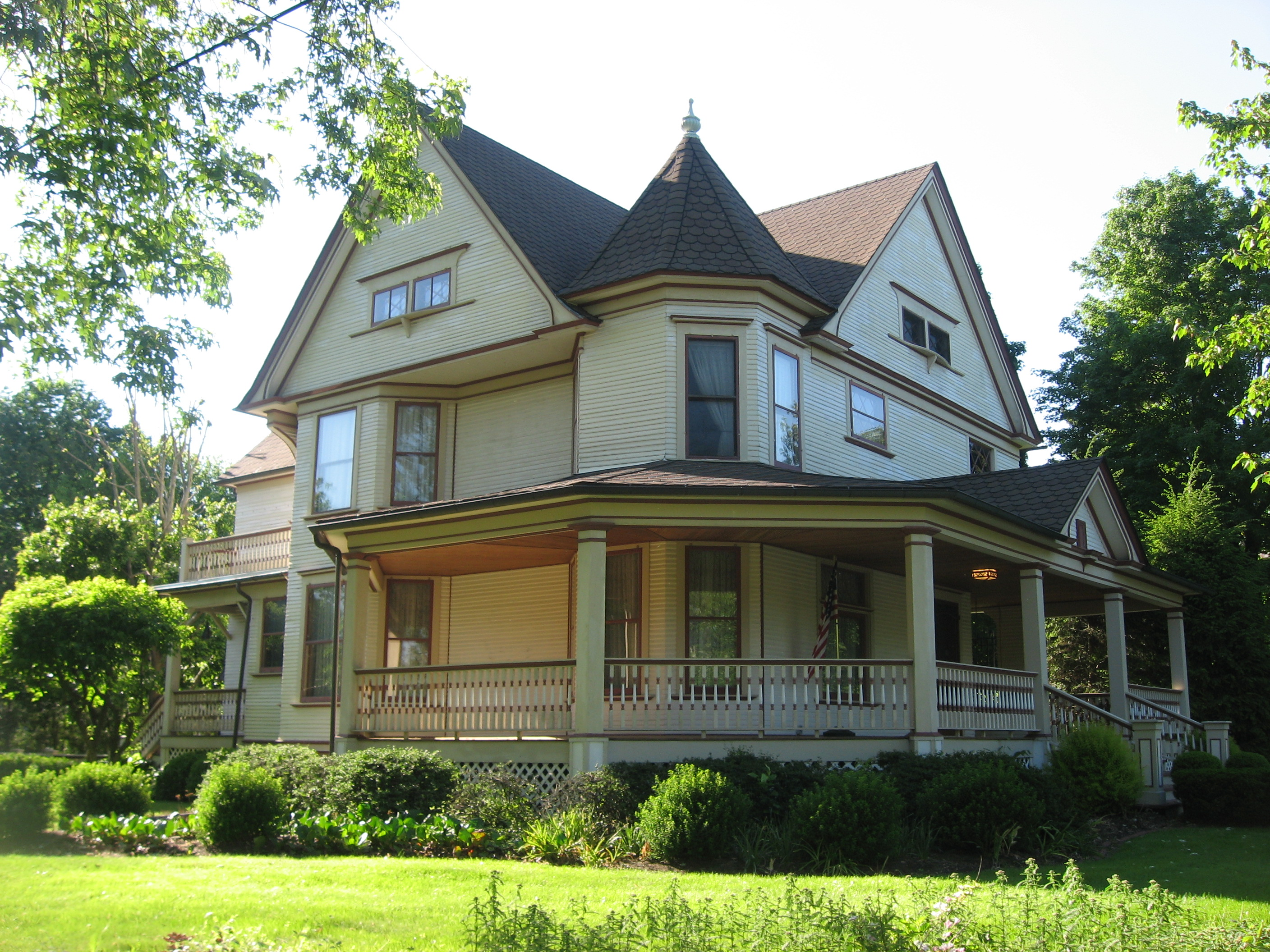
- Crawford-Winslow House, June 2013

- Location within Indiana Location within the United States
- Location: 357 S. Main St., Crown Point, Indiana
- Coordinates: 41°24′47″N 87°21′53″W
- Area: Less than 1 acre (0.40 ha)
- Built: 1890
- Architectural style: Queen Anne
- NRHP reference No.: 13000422
- Added to NRHP: June 25, 2013

Crawford-Winslow House is a historic home located at Crown Point, Indiana, USA. It was built in 1890, and is a 2½-story, Queen Anne style frame dwelling with a cross gable roof with fishscale shingles. It features a corner tower with conical roof, wraparound porch, and leaded glass windows. Also on the property is a contributing garage (c. 1910).

It was listed in the National Register of Historic Places in 2013.
