= Lake County Courthouse (Indiana) =

- U.S. National Register of Historic Places
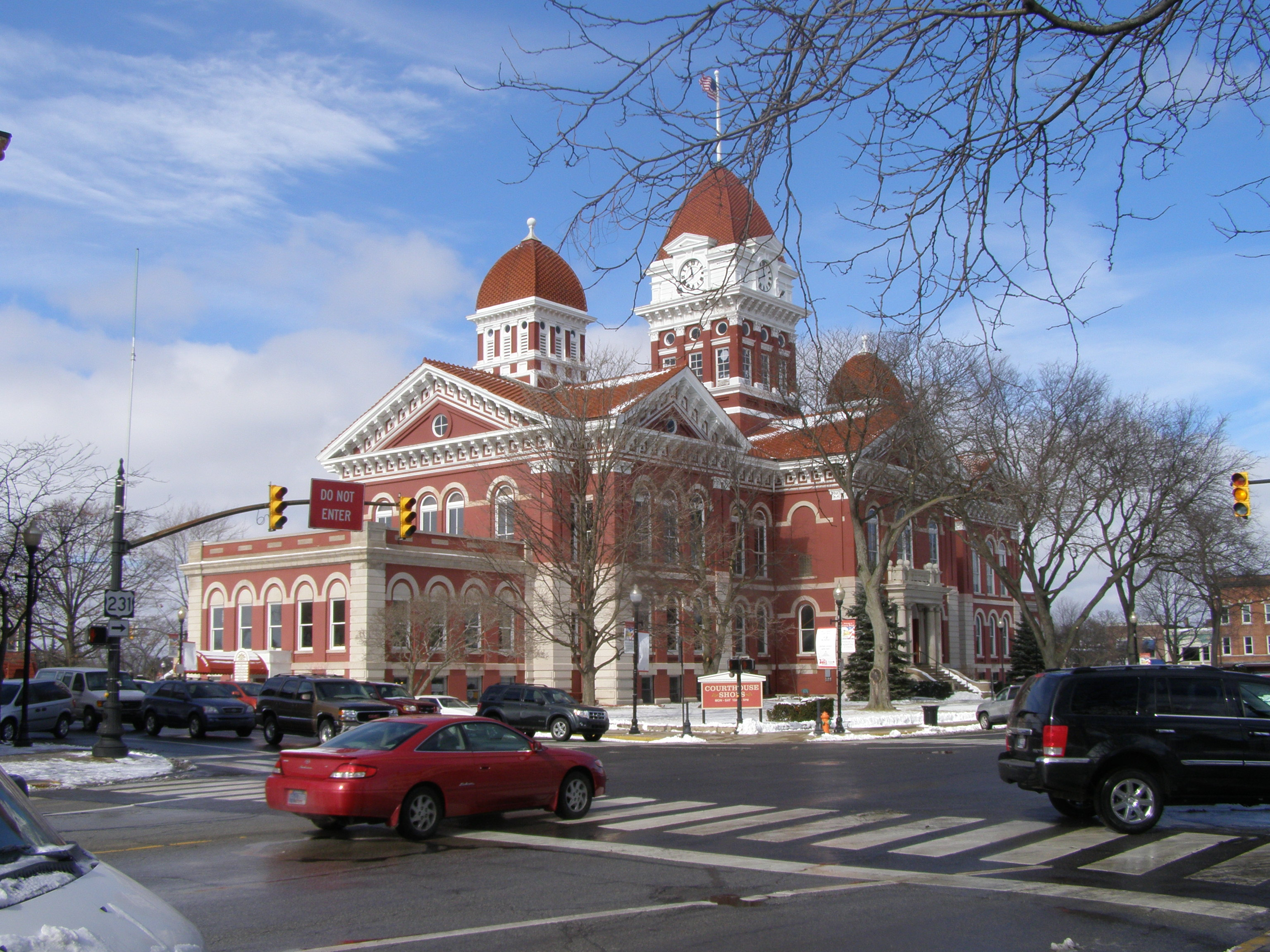
- Old Lake County Courthouse

- Location within Indiana Location within the United States
- Interactive map showing the location of Lake County Courthouse
- Location: Public Sq., Crown Point, Indiana
- Coordinates: 41°25′2″N 87°21′57″W
- Area: 1.5 acres (0.61 ha)
- Built: 1878-1880
- Architect: John C. Cochrane, multiple
- Architectural style: Greek Revival, Romanesque
- NRHP reference No.: 73000073
- Added to NRHP: May 17, 1973

The Lake County Courthouse, in Crown Point, Indiana, also referred to as the "Grand Old Lady", is a former county courthouse building that now houses the Lake County Historical Society Museum, offices, and the chamber of commerce. The building is a combination of architectural styles, including Romanesque and Georgian. It was designed in 1878 by John C. Cochrane of Chicago, Illinois and is listed on the National Register of Historic Places as part of the Crown Point Courthouse Square Historic District.

== History ==
Lake County was organized in 1837 and a small log structure was used as the courthouse. At the time the county was created, three towns were vying to be the County Seat, Lake Court House (the name for Crown Point), Liverpool and West Point. In 1839 the County Commissioners picked Liverpool as the County Seat. Local dissatisfaction brought the state into the process and the following year (1840), Lake Court House was selected. Solon Robinson and Judge William Clark, with County Agent George Earle, gave Lake Court House a new name and in 1868 the town was incorporated as Crown Point.

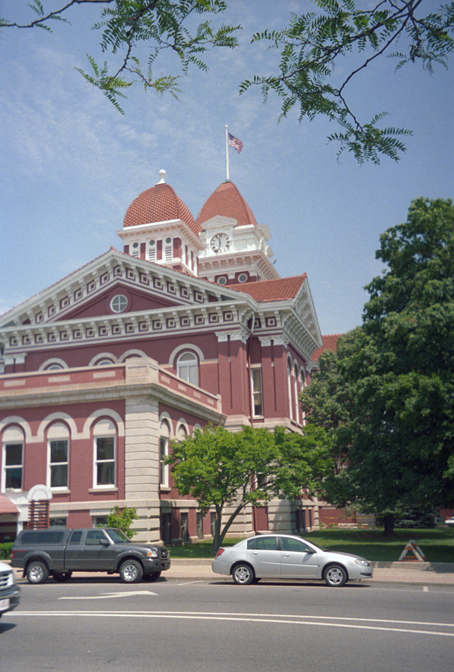
Former Lake County courthouse in Crown Point, Indiana

Meanwhile, in 1849 the log courthouse was replaced by a frame building at a cost of $10,000. By 1876 the frame courthouse was too small. Prominent Chicago architect John C. Cochrane designed a larger and more ornate building. The central portion, including the clock tower, was started in 1878 and dedicated in 1880. The cost was $52,000.00. The brick facade is made of local bricks from the Henry Wise brickyard. The towers were added in 1907 and dedicated in 1909 at a cost of $160,000.00.
