= American Sheet & Tin Plate Co. =

American tinplate manufacturing company

American Sheet and Tin Plate Company was an American industrial company specialized in tinplate products, incorporated in New Jersey with offices at the Frick Building in Pittsburgh, Pennsylvania, and operations around the United States. The company produced sheets of steel, coated with a thin layer of tin.

== History ==
=== Early years ===
The company, amalgamated with the United States Steel Corporation, was formed in November 1903 with the merger of the American Tin Plate Company and the American Sheet Steel company. At the time of the merger a total of seventy-one plants were included in the consolidation of the companies.

During April 1906 the company started the Sabraton Works plant at Morgantown, West Virginia, at a time when the scarcity of steel was affecting the operation of tin plate plants.

The company experienced labor unrest in 1919.

The company was involved in a U.S. Supreme Court case (1937).

The U.S. Federal Trade Commission filed a complaint against the company and fourteen other corporations involved in the manufacturing and sale of tin plate on February 17, 1936, accusing them of collusion, dating to an agreement made October 1934 to suppress the sale and distribution of certain grades and qualities of tin plate. Shortly following this action, the company was merged with the Carnegie-Illinois Steel Corporation, the largest subsidiary of U.S. Steel, effected May 29, 1936.

== The Morgantown Factory ==
The American Sheet and Tin Plate Company opened their Morgantown operations in 1906 after purchasing the layout for the failed Morgantown Tin Plate Mill Company from local industrialist George C. Sturgiss. Sturgiss has originally sold the property to the Rolling Mill Company of America who sold to the Morgantown Tin Plate Company in December 1904. However, the Morgantown Tin Plate Company quickly went bankrupt before the factory could be completed, with Sturgiss regaining the land and plans for the factory for a fee of $200,200, after an arduous court battle. Sturgiss then sold the land and the factory to the American Sheet and Tin Plate Company in 1905. Operating for more than a quarter of a century, the completion and operation of the mill greatly enhanced Morgantown's industrial capability and led to the construction of an electric street railway to ferry workers to and from work. One of Sabraton's earliest industrial centers, the plant originally employed 300 men with the anticipation of eventually employing 800 men and women.

Despite labor disputes and shutdowns at other American Sheet and Tin Plate Co. factories, the Sabraton Works rarely featured shutdowns as a result of labor unrest. The plant did shutdown occasionally due to droughts, as in September 1908, and steel shortages, like the one in January 1913. The largest shutdown occurred on June 21, 1931, as a result of the Great Depression and had the factory closed until July 24, 1933. This reopening was short lived however, as the company closed the Morgantown facility permanently in 1934. In 1940, the Sterling Faucet Company took over operations at the old American Sheet and Tin Plate Company building employing 22 people, ten years later employing 1,000.

== See also ==
- American Sheet and Tin Mill Apartment Building
- Polk Street Concrete Cottage Historic District
- U.S. Steel Recognition Strike of 1901
