= David Droga =

Australian advertising executive (born 1968)

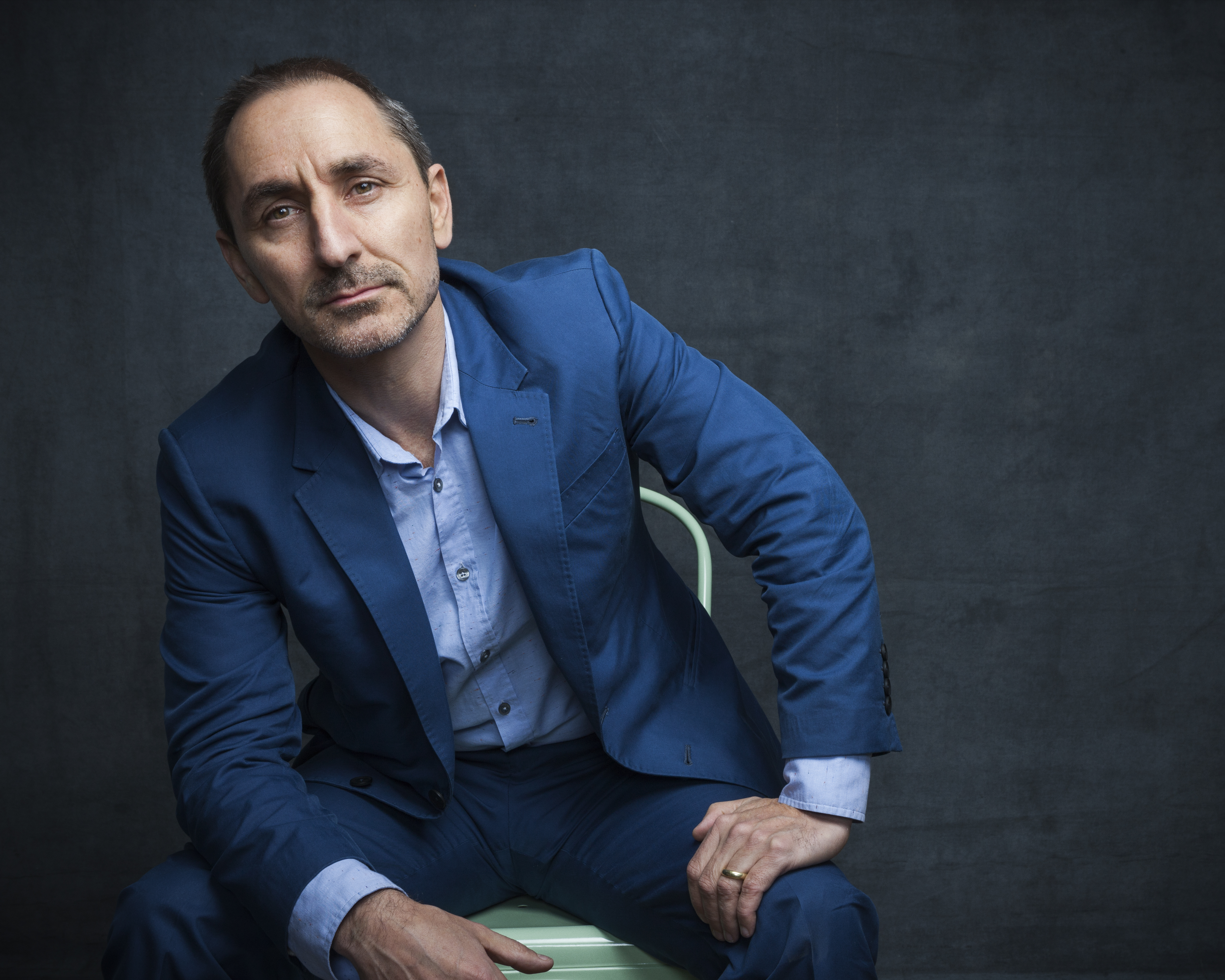
- Born: David Bjorn Droga; 1968 or 1969 (age 57–58); Australia
- Education: The King's School
- Occupation: Businessperson

David Bjorn Droga is an Australian businessperson and advertising executive, currently the vice chair of Accenture. He is the founder of the advertising agency Droga5. Droga5 was acquired by Accenture Interactive in 2019 and Droga was named Chief Executive Officer in August 2021. Droga renamed Accenture Interactive to Accenture Song in 2022. In September 2025, Droga stepped down as CEO of Accenture Song, continuing as vice chair of the broader organization.

== Early life and education ==
David Bjorn Droga was born in Australia. He was raised in rural New South Wales, as the fifth of six children. His father was of Polish descent and operated the Perisher Ski Resort, and his mother was a Danish artist and poet. Droga was raised in a media-free family, with no TV or advertising.

He attended the Tudor House School in Moss Vale, followed by The King's School, Parramatta in the Sydney suburb of North Parramatta.

Droga began working in the mailroom at Grey Advertising, before attending the Australian Writer and Art Directors School in 1987.

== Career ==
Droga was hired by FCB as a copywriter, from the Australian Writer and Art Directors School. A few months later, Droga left the company and joined startup OMON in Sydney. Droga became a Partner and Executive Creative Director of OMON.

Droga joined Saatchi & Saatchi in his mid-20s, working from Singapore as the regional executive creative director of Saatchi Asia. He later became the creative head in London in 1999. In 2000, Publicis Groupe acquired Saatchi. Droga became the global chief creative officer of Publicis in 2003.

Droga founded the advertising agency Droga5 in 2006. In 2013, he sold 49 percent of the business to William Morris Endeavor for $225 million. An early Droga5 marketing idea, the UNICEF Tap Project, was listed as the fifteenth best of the 21st century by Adweek. Droga sold Droga5 to Accenture (via Accenture Interactive) in 2019. Fast Company said the acquisition was "easily the highest profile deal the ad industry has seen in recent memory". In 2021, he became the chief executive officer (CEO) and creative chairman of Accenture Interactive, which became known as Accenture Song in 2022. During his tenure approximately 40 agencies were integrated into Accenture Song, including Karmarama and Rothco. He stepped down as CEO of Accenture Song in September 2025, continuing as vice chair of Accenture.

== Other roles and activities ==
As of 2017 Droga was on the board of New York's New Museum.

== Personal life ==
Droga married a film producer in Thailand in 1998, and they have four children. Droga is an art collector, with a particular interest in Chinese art.
