= Extracurricular activity =

Activity outside regular education

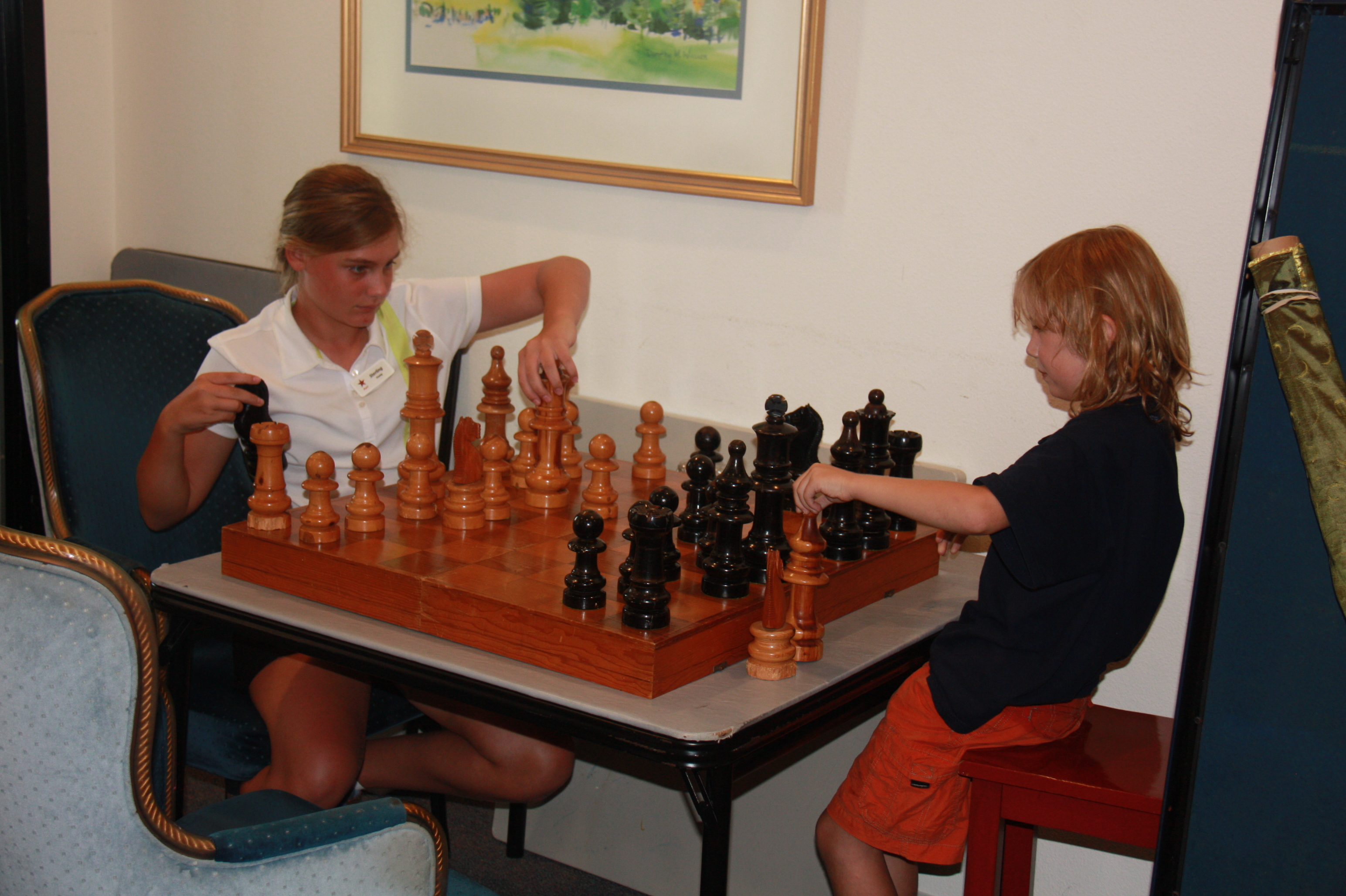
Children at a chess club in the U.S.

An extracurricular activity (ECA) or extra academic activity (EAA) or cultural activity is an activity, usually performed by students, that falls outside the realm of the normal curriculum of school, college or university education. Although approved and often sponsored by school official, such activities are voluntary (as opposed to mandatory) and usually do not carry much academic credit.

== Benefits of participation ==
A group study conducted by surveying school-age students in the National Longitudinal Study of Adolescent Health revealed that 70% of adolescents in the USA are involved in some form of extracurricular activities.

Other studies have shown being involved in extracurricular activities reduces the likelihood of dropping out of school, likelihood of committing a criminal offence, and leads to higher educational retainment and success and achievements in school work, not to mention that the greatest advantage of participating in at least one of these activities is the decrease in anti-social behaviors and students growing up to be more successful in communication and relationships.

Involvement in after school clubs and extracurricular activities is beneficial in a variety of ways for the K-12 population. For example, school clubs can offer a place to form relationships and foster learning, and this was demonstrated with multiple groups. Research including students with disabilities involved in extracurricular activities show that they were more likely to have friends than those who were not involved. Similar findings with racial and ethnic minorities and immigrant adolescents showed that minority, first, and second generation adolescents were less likely than their counterparts to have friends and be engaged in relationships, however, extracurricular activities facilitated socialization. Thus, being involved in activities outside of school increases students' chances of creating friendships. Also, extracurricular activities can provide families with a safe environment for their children while they are at work. This gives the parents an opportunity to get all the work time possible and allows the child to participate in educational or athletic activities. Furthermore, extracurricular activities increase positive self-development, regardless of where the activities take place (at school or away from school) Likewise, female adolescents involved in school based extracurricular activities had higher self-esteem than those not involved. The overall findings demonstrate that involvement in activities, whether it be sports, clubs, or school-based programs, have a positive impact on the participant's life.

== Importance of diversity ==
Diversity in clubs and extracurricular activities plays an important role in adolescent lives and futures. Exposure to diverse groups can help promote adolescents to become socially intelligent and responsible adults. However, being immersed in diverse populations is not enough, as it is beneficial only if members engage with one another. More meaningful interactions with a diverse range of peers allows people to acquire traits such as more socially-responsible leadership skills. Furthermore, participating in ethnic clubs allowed minority groups to feel more connected to their cultures and allowed others to gain knowledge and understanding of other cultures. This has two key benefits: minority groups have a safe place to feel a sense of belonging to their cultural roots and background, and people of differing ethnic backgrounds have an opportunity to learn more about other cultures and thus become more culturally competent. Correlational studies showed positive relationships with involvement in ethnic/cultural clubs and intellectual and psychosocial development, multicultural competence, interpersonal skills, and leadership.

Additionally, in school settings, interracial friendships positively impacted the individuals involved and the school culture as a whole. This demonstrates the importance of implementing multiculturalism into school environments, both academically and in extracurricular activities. It is important to continue research on incorporating multiculturalism and ethnic/cultural clubs into schools. Creating a multicultural competent environment for diverse student populations allows them to engage with others, discuss possible biases and stereotypes openly, and form meaningful intergroup relationships. If that is implemented at a young age, it is more likely to carry into adulthood, thus molding a more socially and culturally competent adult.

== Extracurricular Management Systems ==
An Extracurricular Management System (EMS) is a management information system for education establishments to manage extracurricular data and processes.

The primary function of an EMS is to handle administrative tasks associated with the operation of an extracurricular program so that staff can focus on delivering great extracurricular activities and outcomes for students. Automating the basic administration tasks associated with extracurricular management saves educational institutions money and time, while also improving control and visibility. Extracurricular activities form an important part of the student experience, so managing them accurately and efficiently is of paramount importance in achieving positive outcomes for students.

=== Key responsibilities ===
- Managing the extracurricular calendar
- Reporting on student outcomes in extracurricular activities
- Managing extracurricular staff
- Collecting, reporting and visualising extracurricular data in real-time
- Facilitating two-way integration with the Student Information System
- Being highly accessible via mobile devices
- Communicating personalised extracurricular information to students and parents

An EMS is not responsible for academic or classroom processes, including student class timetables.

== Examples ==
=== Specific events ===
- United States Academic Decathlon
- Model United Nations
- UNICEF Club
- World Scholar's Cup
- Moot court
- Model Crime Investigations
- Competitions such as the National History Day program & Quiz Bowl
- Political science organizations that moot court, or the publication of a law review
- Internships and other school sponsored work programs
- School journalism
- 4-H

=== Generic activities ===
- Topic-specific clubs such as math club, Philanthropy Key Club
- Art
- Band
- Choir
- Debate
- Drama
- English society
- Entrepreneurship
- Fan clubs
- Model United Nations
- Moot Court
- Orchestra
- Reading
- Robotics
- Student government
- Sports
- Tutoring
- University societies
- Yearbook

== See also ==
- After-school activity
- Co-curricular activity (Singapore)
