= Rothko (disambiguation) =

Mark Rothko (1903–1970) was an American painter.

Rothko can also refer to:

- Rothko (band), a London-based instrumental ambient band
- Rothko (club), a New York music venue opened in 2004 and closed in 2006
- Rothko (song), a song by Paris Paloma from her 2026 album The Fatal Flaw

== See also ==
- Rothco, a creative and advertising agency based in Dublin
