= Mary Allison =

Mary Allison may refer to:

- Mary Bruins Allison (1903–1994), American missionary physician in Arabia
- Mary Emma Allison (1917–2010), American school librarian
