= UNICEF club =

International high school and college club

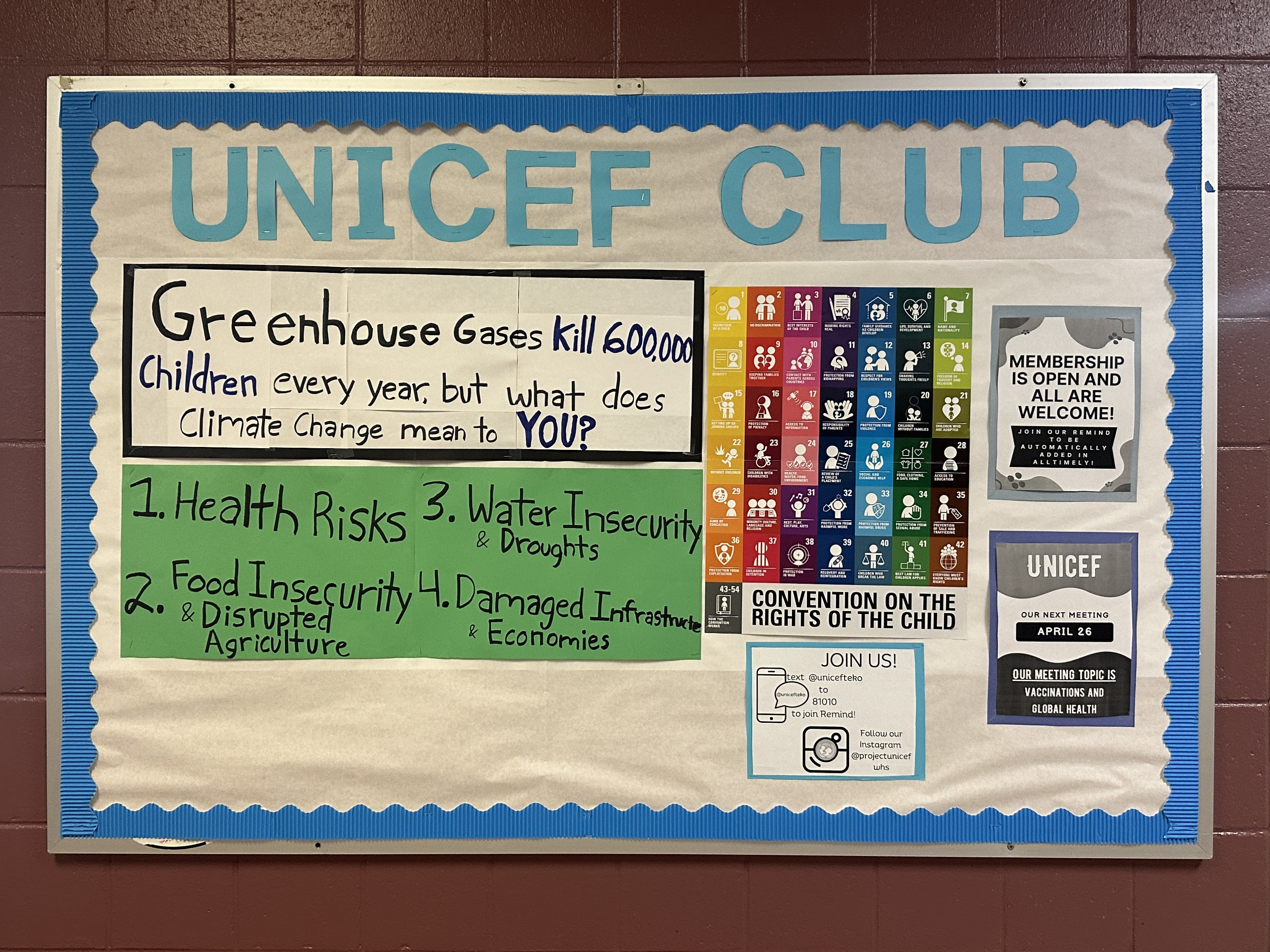
UNICEF club announcement board at a high school in the United States

A UNICEF club is a student-led grassroots club present at high school and college levels of education, formed for the purpose of promoting the values of the parent organization the United Nations Children's Fund or UNICEF. The stated goal of the club is "to empower youth with the resources and skills to be effective global citizens" and "to support the world's most vulnerable children" through advocacy, education, community building, and fundraising. These can be created as their own independent club or as a group within a larger club, as long as separate leaders are appointed for it. Once created, board members are expected to host activities which help advocate or fundraise for UNICEF-related causes, such as "Trick-or-Treat for UNICEF", the "UNICEF Tap Project", or other humanitarian work.

Since the first clubs were founded in 1952, they have received mostly positive reception from the press for their work, with some exceptions. Clubs today can be found in 41 of the 50 states in the United States, and at major universities including Yale and Duke University. Clubs are also present internationally in places like Canada and Hong Kong.

== History ==
The first UNICEF club was created in 1952, (Note: While no official start date is available, clubs began to appear in the US starting later in this year) shortly after the founding of the United Nations in 1946. Little guidelines were implemented for clubs in the beginning: allowing for their creation in middle schools among other things. Early causes, such as funding UNICEF-assisted feeding programs, were accomplished through more modest fundraising methods: including running errands, raking leaves, and selling comic books. More effective advocacy and fundraising methods were developed later. (Note: See the "Activities" section below)

As more clubs began to be established, multiple events have garnered both positive and negative coverage from the press. In 1991, 14 high schools across New Brunswick drafted and submitted a proposal to the Canadian government to allocate funds towards supporting several third world countries needs for healthcare, sanitation, education, etc. after a two day seminar. In 2015, Illinois senator Mark Kirk helped create the UNICEF club at New Trier High School, in which he was an alma mater, to increase awareness of current social issues and to "help and give back", according to Kirk.

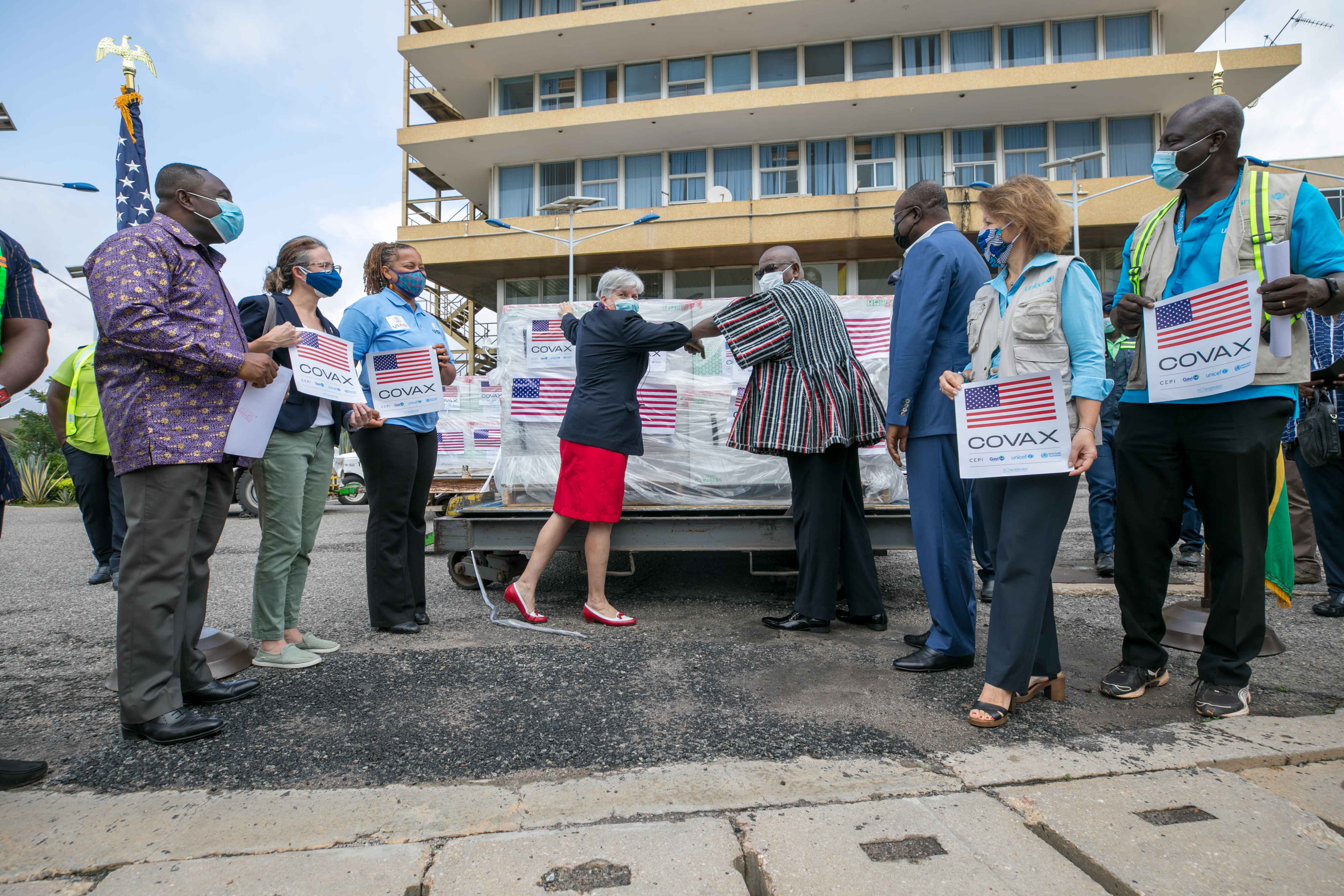
UNICEF clubs during the COVID-19 lockdowns fundraised online to support UNICEF COVID-19 relief efforts, depicted above

During the COVID-19 pandemic, UNICEF clubs either worked virtually or were forced to suspend their operations during the pandemic lockdowns. For the clubs that decided to work virtually, online fundraising events were used to help support UNICEF COVID-19 relief efforts.

In response to the start of the Gaza war in 2023, some UNICEF clubs in the Scottsdale Unified School District in Arizona were accused by the state superintendent Tom Horne of being overly pro-Palestinian, to the point of promoting "one-sided propaganda in favor of Hamas terrorists".

== Club creation and management ==
To create a UNICEF club, four leaders and one advisor are required as minimum leadership. Advisors must be adults aged 25 years or older, and should not be a staff member for UNICEF. Advisors must also perform a background check if not a teacher or high-school employee. Once gathered, the club's registration application must be approved by UNICEF to become official. Official clubs are expected to hold registered and approved events by UNICEF focused on advocacy, education, community building, and fundraising for children's rights. Clubs are required to re-register and submit yearly funds at the start of each school year. UNICEF clubs can also be made as a sub-group within a larger, like-minded club, as long as additional leaders are chosen specifically to work on UNICEF-related tasks.

=== Leadership ===
There are six board member or leadership positions within the club, listed in the table below. Leaders of the club are required to commit to at least five hours per week, host board meetings at least once a week, and host member meetings at most biweekly. Leadership terms are one school-year long before being reassigned.

Leadership positions/board members
Position	By whom	Responsibility	Ref.
President	Student	Organize and execute events, coordinate leadership transitions	
Vice President	Student	Assists President, assumes control over their roles when absent	
Secretary	Student	Records minutes and agenda	
Treasurer	Student	Manages club budget and oversees transactions, submits donations to UNICEF	
Communication Officer(s)	Student	Manages club social media accounts	
Advisor	Adult	Serves as a mentor offering advice, but does not run the club	

== Activities ==
In recent history, two annually-held activities present in many UNICEF clubs are the Trick-or-Treat for UNICEF and UNICEF Tap Project donation collections. Serving as the largest fundraising event for some clubs, Trick-or-Treat for UNICEF takes place on Halloween, and is often executed by trick-or-treating for donations instead of candy. The UNICEF Tap Project takes place during World Water Day on 22 March, and has been executed recently via UNICEF's Tap Project app: where 'for every 10 minutes you don't use your phone, a child is provided 1 day of clean water'.

Hosting bingo and open mic nights, dances and concerts, elementary and middle school assemblies, "Advocacy Day" events, and golf tournaments, as well as selling support T-shirts baked goods, bracelets, and buttons, making tie blankets, and other means of advocacy and fundraising have been performed by UNICEF clubs for causes such as supporting Syrian refuges and affected families of the War in Darfur and the 2023 Turkey–Syria earthquakes, as well as bringing awareness to malnutrition, the Zika virus, and child trafficking.

== Locations ==
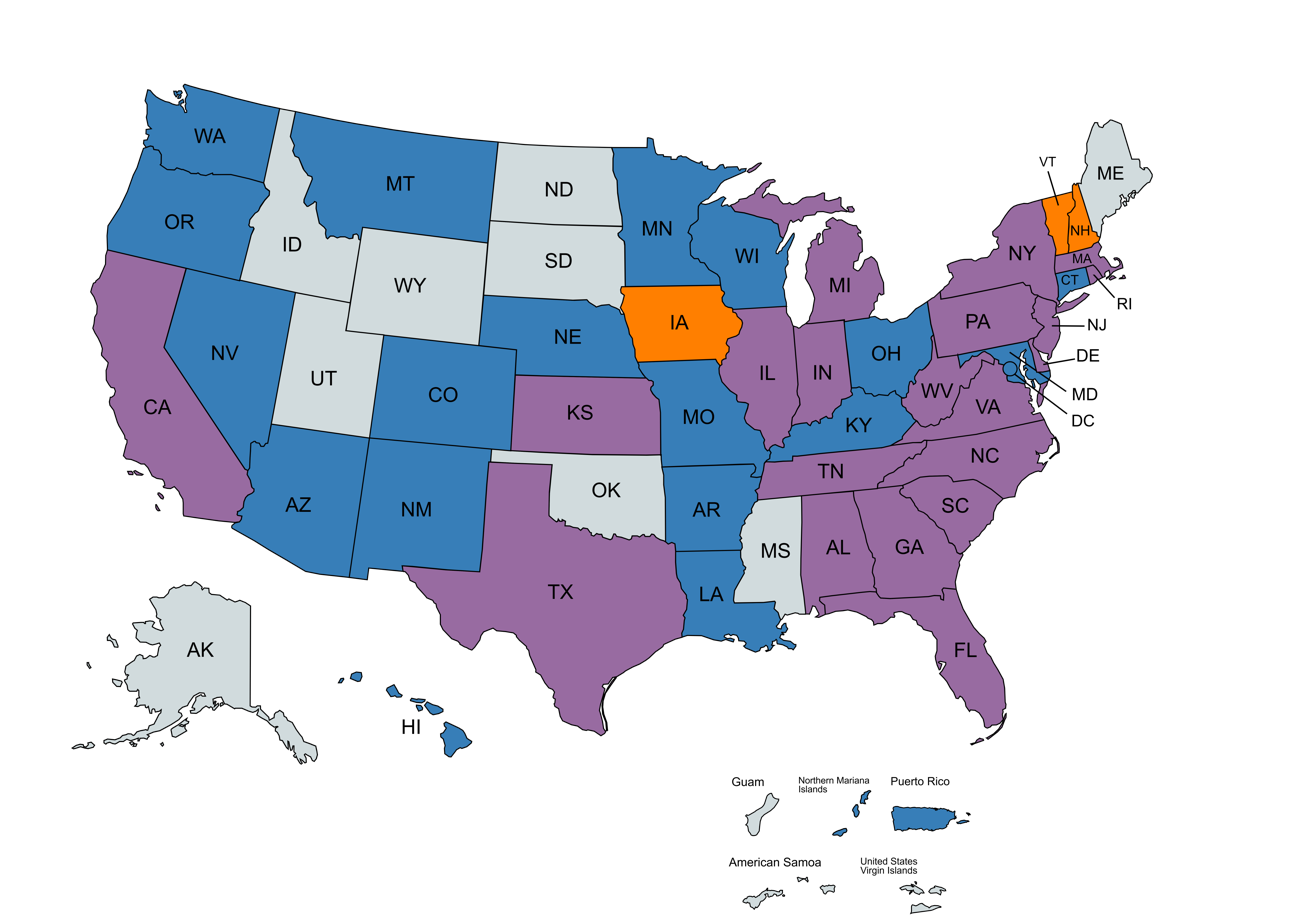
States with clubs present in high school(s) States with clubs present in college(s) States with clubs present in both

UNICEF clubs are present at a number of US high schools and universities. As of the 2025–26 school year in the US, there are UNICEF clubs present in just colleges in three states, just high schools in 18 states, and both colleges and high schools in a further 20 states, leaving only nine states without any presence of UNICEF clubs. A further three territories: the Northern Mariana Islands, Puerto Rico, and Washington D.C., have clubs present in just high schools. Major private universities, such as Duke University and Yale University, host UNICEF clubs of their own.

Clubs are also present internationally, including in Canada since no later than 1965, and Hong Kong since 2007.
