= Lowell, Indiana =

- Town
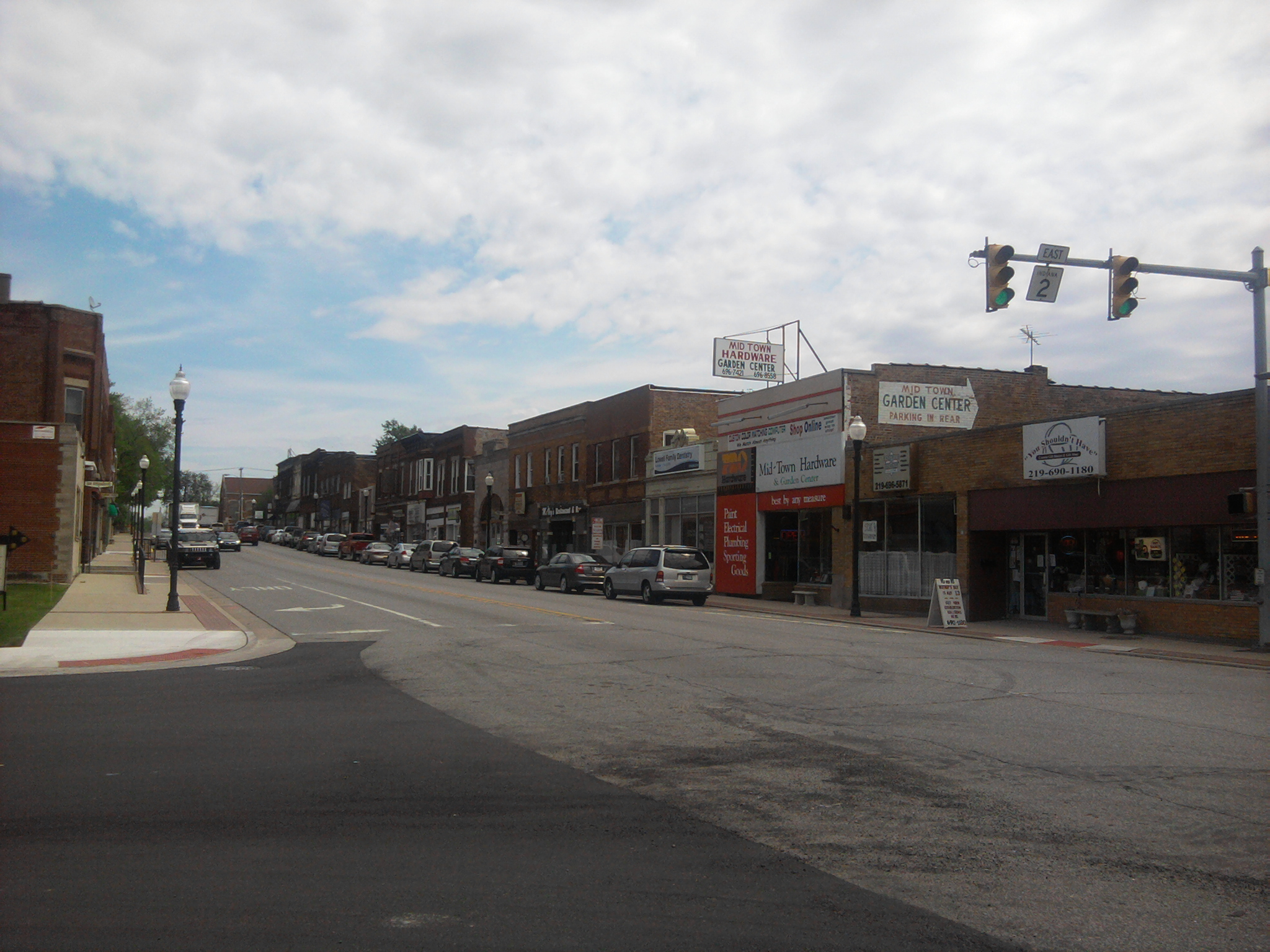
- Commercial Avenue in downtown Lowell

- Seal
- Motto: "Proud Past Bright Future"
- Location of Lowell in Lake County, Indiana.
- Coordinates: 41°16′00″N 87°24′45″W
- Country: United States
- State: Indiana
- County: Lake
- Township: West Creek, Cedar Creek
- Settled: 1834
- Founded: 1853
- Incorporated: June 27, 1868

Government
  - Type: Town
  - Body: Town Council
  - Founder: Melvin Amos Halsted
  - Town President: Todd Angerman (R)
  - Town Vice President: Mike Gruszka (R)
  - Members: Michael Gruszka (R, 1st), Todd Angerman (R, 2nd), John Alessia (D, 3rd), Shane Tucker (R, 4th), John Yelkich (D, 5th)
  - Clerk Treasurer: Judy Walters (D)

Area
  - Total: 6.58 sq mi (17.04 km^{2})
  - Land: 6.50 sq mi (16.83 km^{2})
  - Water: 0.081 sq mi (0.21 km^{2})
- Elevation: 679 ft (207 m)

Population (2020)
  - Total: 10,680
  - Density: 1,643.7/sq mi (634.65/km^{2})
- Time zone: UTC−6 (Central (CST))
  - Summer (DST): UTC−5 (CDT)
- ZIP code: 46356
- Area code: 219
- FIPS code: 18-45144
- GNIS feature ID: 2396726
- Website: www.lowell.net

Lowell (/ˈloʊəl/ LOH-əl) is a town in West Creek and Cedar Creek townships, Lake County, Indiana, United States. The population was 10,680 at the 2020 census.

== History ==
Lowell was platted in 1853. It was named after Lowell, Massachusetts. On June 27, 1868, Lowell was officially incorporated as a town.

The James Brannon House, Melvin A. Halsted House, Lowell Commercial Historic District, Charles E. Nichols House, and J. Claude Rumsey House are listed in the National Register of Historic Places.

== Geography ==
According to the 2010 census, Lowell has a total area of 5.27 square miles (13.65 km^{2}), of which 5.18 square miles (13.42 km^{2}) (or 98.29%) is land and 0.09 square miles (0.23 km^{2}) (or 1.71%) is water.

Located five miles (8 km) outside of the Great Lakes Basin, Lowell sought permission to pipe in lake water to replace city water drawn from its high fluoride deep wells. However, diversion of water out of the Great Lakes requires the approval of the Great Lakes Commission, which includes representatives of all the US states and Canadian provinces that border on the lakes. Lowell's request was turned down in 1991.

Lowell lies on the Valparaiso Moraine, almost on the Kankakee Outwash Plain. The town also lies near the St. Lawrence Seaway Divide.

=== Climate ===
Lowell has a Humid continental climate (Köppen climate classification Dfa) with four distinct seasons.

Climate data for Lowell, Indiana (1991–2020 normals, 1963–present)
Month	Jan	Feb	Mar	Apr	May	Jun	Jul	Aug	Sep	Oct	Nov	Dec	Year
Record high °F (°C)	66 (19)	73 (23)	85 (29)	91 (33)	96 (36)	104 (40)	101 (38)	104 (40)	98 (37)	92 (33)	79 (26)	70 (21)	104 (40)
Mean maximum °F (°C)	53.9 (12.2)	56.8 (13.8)	70.9 (21.6)	80.6 (27.0)	88.6 (31.4)	93.2 (34.0)	92.9 (33.8)	91.8 (33.2)	90.3 (32.4)	83.4 (28.6)	68.6 (20.3)	57.3 (14.1)	95.2 (35.1)
Mean daily maximum °F (°C)	31.5 (−0.3)	35.8 (2.1)	47.4 (8.6)	60.3 (15.7)	71.3 (21.8)	80.7 (27.1)	83.5 (28.6)	81.8 (27.7)	76.8 (24.9)	63.6 (17.6)	49.1 (9.5)	36.9 (2.7)	59.9 (15.5)
Daily mean °F (°C)	23.2 (−4.9)	26.7 (−2.9)	37.3 (2.9)	49.0 (9.4)	60.1 (15.6)	69.9 (21.1)	73.0 (22.8)	71.1 (21.7)	64.7 (18.2)	52.4 (11.3)	39.6 (4.2)	28.9 (−1.7)	49.7 (9.8)
Mean daily minimum °F (°C)	15.0 (−9.4)	17.7 (−7.9)	27.3 (−2.6)	37.7 (3.2)	48.9 (9.4)	59.1 (15.1)	62.5 (16.9)	60.4 (15.8)	52.5 (11.4)	41.0 (5.0)	30.2 (−1.0)	20.9 (−6.2)	39.4 (4.1)
Mean minimum °F (°C)	−7.6 (−22.0)	−3.2 (−19.6)	9.7 (−12.4)	23.3 (−4.8)	34.0 (1.1)	44.3 (6.8)	51.0 (10.6)	50.0 (10.0)	38.2 (3.4)	26.7 (−2.9)	15.4 (−9.2)	1.1 (−17.2)	−12.2 (−24.6)
Record low °F (°C)	−28 (−33)	−23 (−31)	−9 (−23)	7 (−14)	24 (−4)	33 (1)	41 (5)	38 (3)	28 (−2)	18 (−8)	−2 (−19)	−29 (−34)	−29 (−34)
Average precipitation inches (mm)	2.33 (59)	1.91 (49)	2.34 (59)	3.68 (93)	4.24 (108)	5.11 (130)	4.31 (109)	4.27 (108)	3.27 (83)	3.56 (90)	2.62 (67)	2.24 (57)	39.88 (1,013)
Average snowfall inches (cm)	9.7 (25)	9.3 (24)	3.4 (8.6)	0.3 (0.76)	0.0 (0.0)	0.0 (0.0)	0.0 (0.0)	0.0 (0.0)	0.0 (0.0)	0.2 (0.51)	0.9 (2.3)	5.9 (15)	29.7 (75)
Average precipitation days (≥ 0.01 in)	11.2	9.8	10.7	12.8	12.9	11.8	10.4	10.0	9.1	11.1	10.5	11.6	131.9
Average snowy days (≥ 0.1 in)	5.8	4.8	2.1	0.4	0.0	0.0	0.0	0.0	0.0	0.1	0.6	4.5	18.3
Source: NOAA

== Demographics ==
Historical population
Census	Pop.	Note	%±
1880	458		—
1890	761		66.2%
1900	1,275		67.5%
1910	1,235		−3.1%
1920	1,197		−3.1%
1930	1,274		6.4%
1940	1,448		13.7%
1950	1,621		11.9%
1960	2,270		40.0%
1970	3,839		69.1%
1980	5,827		51.8%
1990	6,430		10.3%
2000	7,505		16.7%
2010	9,276		23.6%
2020	10,680		15.1%
U.S. Decennial Census

=== Racial and ethnic composition ===
Lowell town, Indiana – Racial and ethnic composition Note: the US Census treats Hispanic/Latino as an ethnic category. This table excludes Latinos from the racial categories and assigns them to a separate category. Hispanics/Latinos may be of any race.
Race / Ethnicity (NH = Non-Hispanic)	Pop 2000	Pop 2010	Pop 2020	% 2000	% 2010	% 2020
White alone (NH)	7,149	8,456	9,156	95.26%	91.16%	85.73%
Black or African American alone (NH)	2	48	91	0.03%	0.52%	0.85%
Native American or Alaska Native alone (NH)	21	28	15	0.28%	0.30%	0.14%
Asian alone (NH)	18	24	42	0.24%	0.26%	0.39%
Native Hawaiian or Pacific Islander alone (NH)	1	2	2	0.01%	0.02%	0.02%
Other race alone (NH)	2	5	22	0.03%	0.05%	0.21%
Mixed race or Multiracial (NH)	47	73	471	0.63%	0.79%	4.41%
Hispanic or Latino (any race)	265	640	881	3.53%	6.90%	8.25%
Total	7,505	9,276	10,680	100.00%	100.00%	100.00%

=== 2020 census ===
As of the 2020 census, Lowell had a population of 10,680. The median age was 37.7 years. 24.1% of residents were under the age of 18 and 15.4% of residents were 65 years of age or older. For every 100 females there were 95.8 males, and for every 100 females age 18 and over there were 92.9 males age 18 and over.

98.8% of residents lived in urban areas, while 1.2% lived in rural areas.

There were 4,009 households in Lowell, of which 35.7% had children under the age of 18 living in them. Of all households, 52.9% were married-couple households, 15.9% were households with a male householder and no spouse or partner present, and 24.6% were households with a female householder and no spouse or partner present. About 24.2% of all households were made up of individuals and 11.3% had someone living alone who was 65 years of age or older.

There were 4,196 housing units, of which 4.5% were vacant. The homeowner vacancy rate was 1.4% and the rental vacancy rate was 8.3%.

=== 2010 census ===
As of the census of 2010, there were 9,276 people, 3,392 households, and 2,500 families living in the town. The population density was 1,790.7 inhabitants per square mile (691.4/km^{2}). There were 3,620 housing units at an average density of 698.8 per square mile (269.8/km^{2}). The racial makeup of the town was 95.9% White, 0.5% African American, 0.4% Native American, 0.3% Asian, 0.1% Pacific Islander, 1.7% from other races, and 1.2% from two or more races. Hispanic or Latino of any race were 6.9% of the population.

There were 3,392 households, of which 39.1% had children under the age of 18 living with them, 56.3% were married couples living together, 11.9% had a female householder with no husband present, 5.5% had a male householder with no wife present, and 26.3% were non-families. 21.4% of all households were made up of individuals, and 8.3% had someone living alone who was 65 years of age or older. The average household size was 2.71 and the average family size was 3.16.

The median age in the town was 35.7 years. 26.6% of residents were under the age of 18; 8.8% were between the ages of 18 and 24; 27.8% were from 25 to 44; 25.1% were from 45 to 64; and 11.7% were 65 years of age or older. The gender makeup of the town was 49.2% male and 50.8% female.

=== 2000 census ===
As of the census of 2000, there were 7,505 people, 2,697 households, and 2,030 families living in the town. The population density was 1,839.2 inhabitants per square mile (710.1/km^{2}). There were 2,809 housing units at an average density of 688.4 per square mile (265.8/km^{2}). The racial makeup of the town was 97.30% White, 0.03% African American, 0.39% Native American, 0.24% Asian, 0.01% Pacific Islander, 1.12% from other races, and 0.92% from two or more races. Hispanic or Latino of any race was 3.53% of the population.

There were 2,697 households, out of which 39.3% had children under the age of 18 living with them, 62.2% were married couples living together, 10.3% had a female householder with no husband present, and 24.7% were non families. 20.4% of all households were made up of individuals, and 7.6% had someone living alone who was 65 years of age or older. The average household size was 2.74, and the average family size was 3.19.

In the town, the population was spread out, with 28.6% under the age of 18, 8.3% from 18 to 24, 31.1% from 25 to 44, 21.1% from 45 to 64, and 10.8% who were 65 years of age or older. The median age was 34 years. For every 100 females, there were 96.5 males. For every 100 females age 18 and over, there were 91.3 males.

The median income for a household in the town was $49,173, and the median income for a family was $54,797. Males had a median income of $45,023, versus $23,378 for females. The per capita income for the town was $19,752. About 5.6% of families and 6.5% of the population were below the poverty line, including 7.8% of those under age 18 and 5.4% of those age 65 or over.

== Schools ==
- Lowell Senior High School
- Lowell Middle School
- Lake Prairie Elementary School
- Oak Hill Elementary School
- Three Creeks Elementary School
- Lowell Christian Academy
- St.Edwards Catholic School (Pre-School Only)

== Transportation ==
=== Commuter Rail ===
Lowell commuters to Chicago are served by the South Shore Line via Gary Metro Center in Gary, Indiana on the Lakeshore Corridor line or via Munster/Dyer station in Munster, Indiana on the Monon Corridor line that opened on March 31, 2026.

== Events ==
Lowell hosts the oldest Labor Day parade in Indiana. Buckley Homestead, east of Lowell, hosts a number of events, including a World War II reenactment with authentic weapons, artillery, and tanks. The Legend of Sleepy Hollow is another event that takes place in Lowell in September.

== Notable people ==
- Mary Emma Allison, humanitarian and librarian
- Steve Carter, 41st Indiana Attorney General
- Corbett Davis, quarterback and top NFL draft pick in 1938 to the Cleveland Rams
- Amy Ruley, member of Women's Basketball Hall of Fame
- Jo Anne Worley, actress and comedian
