= Lowell Commercial Historic District =

Historic district in Indiana, United States

- U.S. National Register of Historic Places
- U.S. Historic district
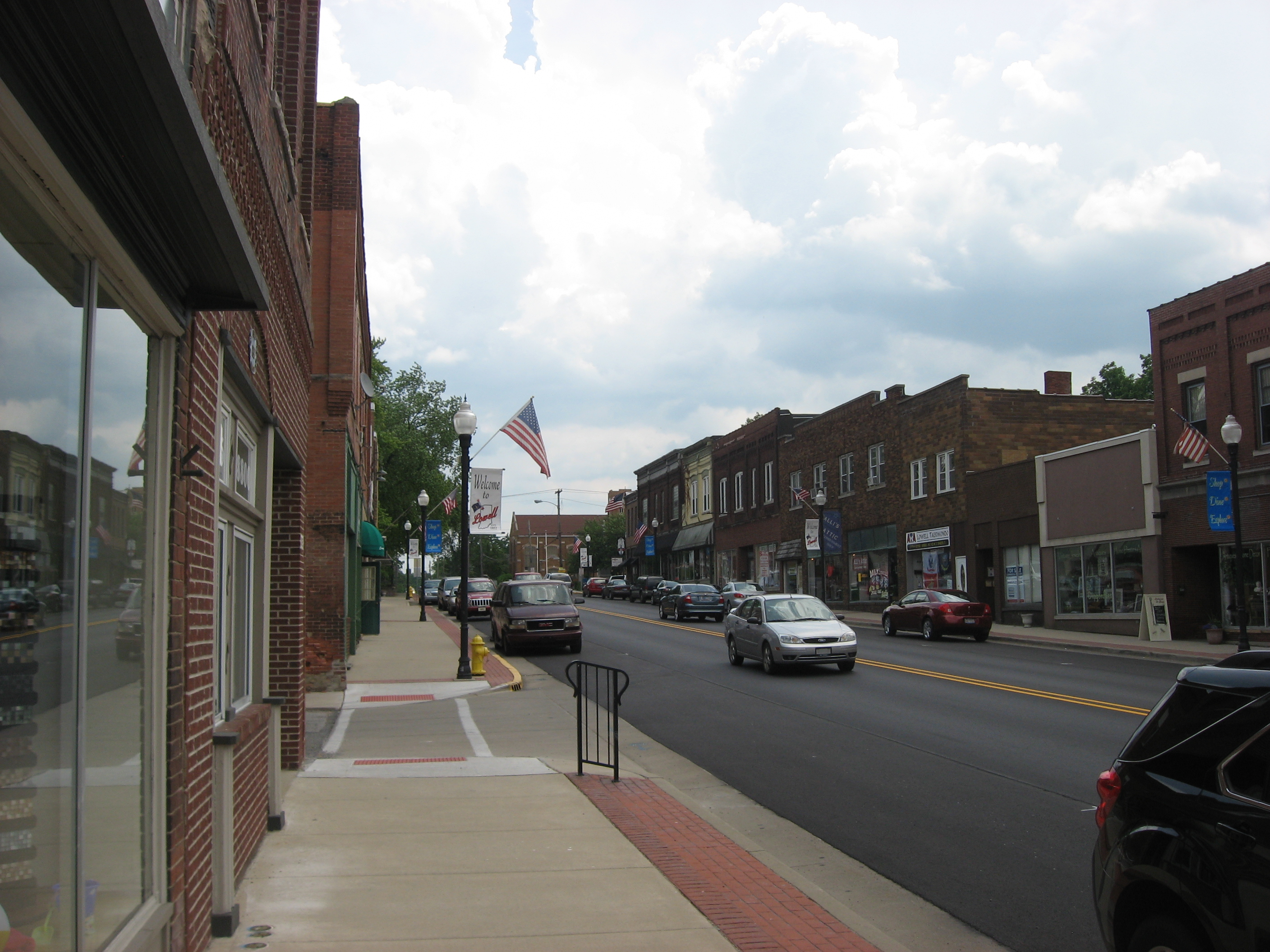
- Streetside in downtown Lowell, June 2012

- Location within Indiana Location within the United States
- Location: 305-519 Commercial Ave. and 108-110 Clark St., Lowell, Indiana
- Coordinates: 41°17′30″N 87°25′23″W
- Area: 4 acres (1.6 ha)
- Built: 1898
- Built by: Clark, Perry D.; et.al.
- Architectural style: Late Victorian, Late 19th And Early 20th Century American Movements
- NRHP reference No.: 03000144
- Added to NRHP: March 26, 2003

Lowell Commercial Historic District is a national historic district located at Lowell, Indiana. The district encompasses 28 contributing buildings, 1 contributing site, and 1 contributing object in the central business district of Lowell. It developed between about 1870 and 1952, and includes notable example of Italianate, Queen Anne, Romanesque Revival, Bungalow / American Craftsman, and Art Deco style architecture. Notable buildings include the Roberts Building (1948), Colfax Lodge (1898), Bacon House (c. 1870), Lowell National Bank (1903), Lowell Town Hall (1922), and Lowell Carnegie Library (1920).

It was listed in the National Register of Historic Places in 2003.

== Significant Buildings ==
- 307 East Commercial Avenue, Roberts Building. Built for the Roberts Law and Insurance offices in 1948, it was damaged during the 1976 Opera House fire. The limestone facade overlays a brick structure. Ornamentation is limited to Limestone corners that created the appearance of quoins.
- 313 East Commercial Avenue. The 1898 fire on this site led to the city's requirements that new buildings must be of masonry. The State Bank building was built in 1900.
- 317-319 East Commercial Avenue, 1899 (N)
  - 317 - The Grant Brothers Department Store used this building built by Perry D. Clark in 1899. Numerous businesses have been housed here, including telephone companies, a photography studio, a beauty parlor, American Legion Post 101, doctor and lawyer offices, and a barbershop. This is a notable example of the design and construction methods, in spite of the altered storefront. It retains the original iron I-beam spanning the storefront. The entrance door to the stairs to the second floor is in its original location.
  - 319 - Was the George M. Death's hardware store, destroyed by fire in 1898 and rebuilt in 1899. Death operated the hardware store for thirty-six years. Among the drug stores which were located here was Scritchfield's who was responsible for the sign. The c. 1920 sign, painted by Fred Viant, along the Clark Street wall has been restored. It advertised the Rexall Drug Store (a previous tenant).
- 427 East Commercial Avenue, Bacon House, c. 1870 O The house was built by Dr. E. R. Bacon, a prominent physician and Civil War veteran. It was saved from 1898 fire because of a nearby well. The two-story frame house is an excellent outstanding Italianate frame building. The home has four bays, with the entrance occupying the second. There is a bay window on the eastern side of the house. Above the entrance there is a second floor door to the porch. It has a hipped roof with overhanging eaves and a widow's walk.
- 428 East Commercial Avenue, Lowell Town Hall. The land that the Town Hall was constructed on was given to the town by Jabez Clark. The Town Hall was constructed in 1922. The lower floor was offices with the fire department in the back. The upper floor had a large room for public gatherings. It has been remodeled several times for use by the Lowell Police Department and the Lowell Chamber of Commerce. The two-story, brick building is a mix of the Arts and Crafts and Neo-Classical styles. The entrances have limestone architraves, with Neo-Classical "ears." The short windows are situated high, with the limestone sills about at eye level. They have limestone flat arches that feature keystones. The middle panel contains a plaque that reads "Lowell Town Hall Erected 1922." The Building is divided by two limestone courses separated by several courses of brick. There are three windows situated in the middle bays with a metal balustrade beneath. The front-facing gabled roof has large, overhanging eaves, supported by Craftsman styled brackets. The Lowell Tribune moved into the building in March 2018 to share space with the Lowell Chamber of Commerce, and a ribbon cutting ceremony was held on April 4, 2018, to officially welcome the town newspaper into the building.
- Town Square, Three Creeks Monument. Part donated by Dr. Jabez Clark and the rest was purchased by the town. The park was used for foot races, ice-cream socials, and band concerts. At the turn of the century, a water tower was erected there, and later the fountain was placed on that spot. In 1905, the Three Creeks Monument was dedicated by Governor Frank Hanley The monument made of Barre Granite by Clark Bros. Monument Co. of Wabash and is 25 feet (7.6 m) feet tall and weighs 45 long tons (46 t). The names of 504 soldiers, sailors, and one Navy nurse, veterans of the War of 1812, Civil War, Mexican War, and Spanish–American War from Eagle Creek, Cedar Creek, and West Creek townships are inscribed on sides.
