= Melvin A. Halsted House =

Historic house in Indiana, United States

- U.S. National Register of Historic Places
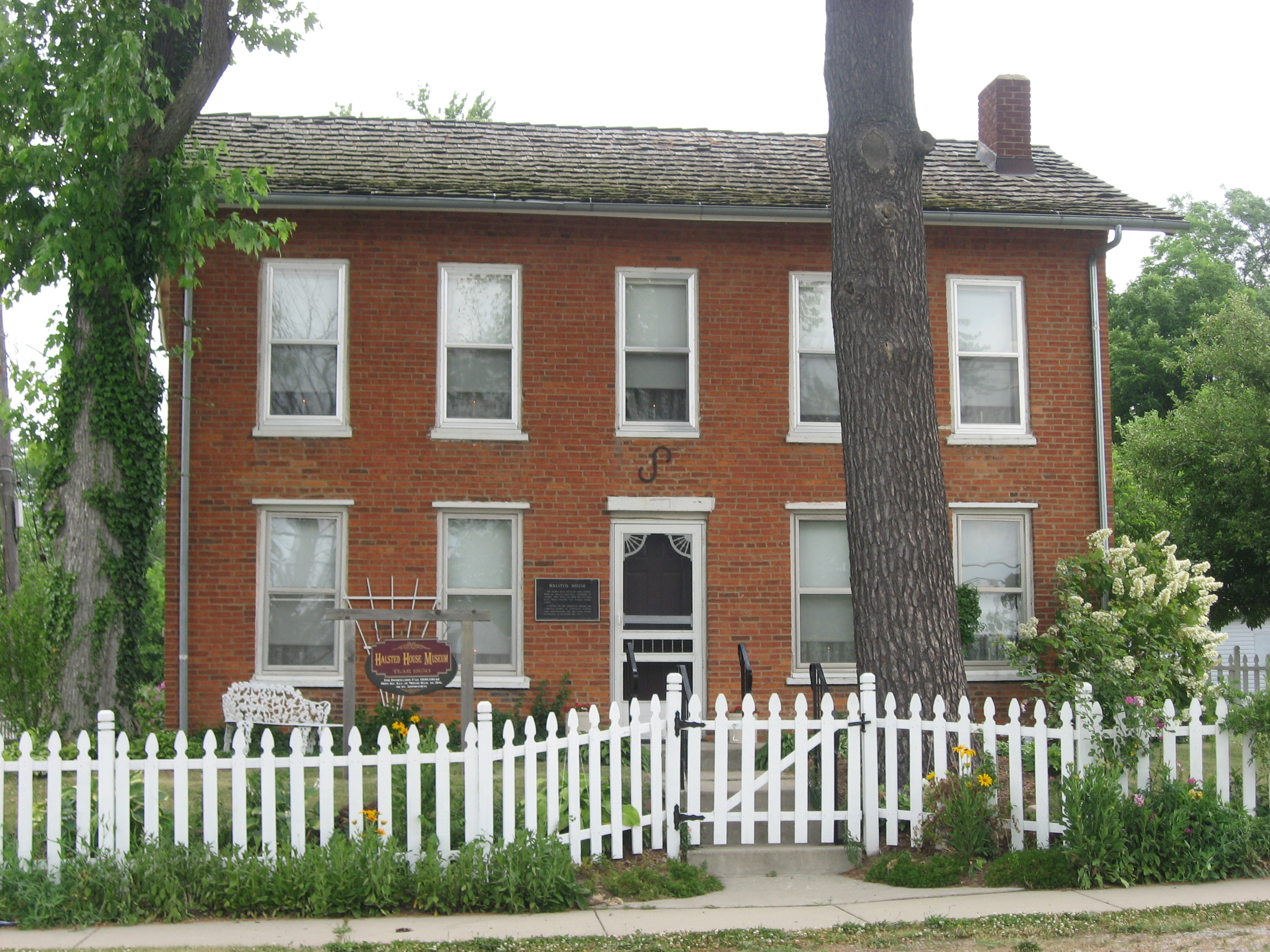
- Melvin A. Halsted House, located at 201 E. Main Street in Lowell, Indiana.

- Location within Indiana Location within the United States
- Location: 201 E. Main St., Lowell, Indiana
- Coordinates: 41°17′36″N 87°25′24″W
- Area: less than one acre
- Built: 1850
- Architectural style: Federal
- NRHP reference No.: 78000037
- Added to NRHP: December 8, 1978

Melvin A. Halsted House is a historic home located at Lowell, Indiana. It was built in 1850, and is a two-story, five-bay, Federal style brick dwelling with a gable roof. It has a rear lean-to addition. It was the home of a founder of Lowell and Melvin A. Halsted resided there until 1905.

It was listed in the National Register of Historic Places in 1978.
