= Model Crime Investigations =

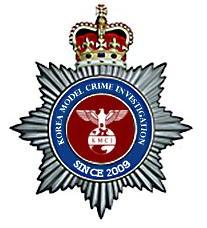
Seal representing KMCI

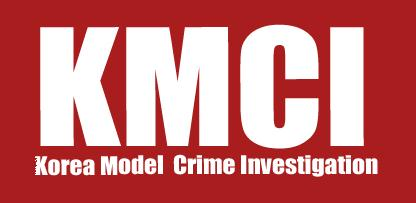
Crimson red: Justice; White: Integrity

Started in 2008, Model Crime Investigations (or Model CI, MCI) is a student-associated international conference. Model Crime Investigations is held annually in South Korea so it is usually known as KMCI. MCI is an extracurricular activity where students gather to learn about how a police department operates, as well as about how the broader criminal justice system functions. In the actual conference of simulation, participants will debate upon civil or criminal cases to find culprits among virtual suspects in committees. Unlike scientific investigation, in Model Crime Investigation participants usually interrogate suspects in oral arguments, and gather verbal evidence. Issues that can be discussed will vary from minor cases such as robbery to major crimes such as international terrorism. During the sessions, students who charge the investigation will have to work on affidavit by summarizing the points given by the suspects and witnesses, for the purpose of exterminating crimes by means such as arrest and/or complaint; and prosecute suspects. Along with Model United Nations, Moot Court, Mock Trial, or Model Congress, Model Crime Investigations aims to build students' global perspective.

== History ==
- On December 8, 2008, YMCI (Youth Model Crime Investigation) was created. Back then, YMCI only aimed for high school students around the world.
- On April 2, 2009, the name was changed to MCI (Model Crime Investigations), so that university students can join a conference also. (Official age restriction is from 9th to 12th grade students.)
- On September 3, 2021, Puzzles Chu Debate Club successfully organized the first ever MCI in Vietnam with approximately 200 participants from all over Vietnam.

== Operation ==
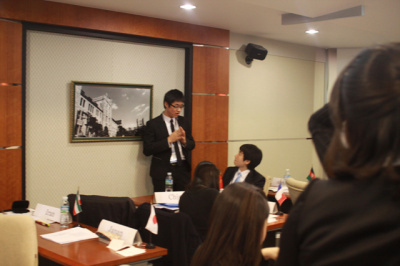
A student making a speech

KMCI basically follows the system of Department of Justice in United States. Committees students can take are Federal Bureau of Investigation, US Marshals, Drug Enforcement Administration, Bureau of Alcohol, Tobacco, Firearms and Explosive, or Department of Homeland Security. Each student will work as police designated as a Lieutenant, Sergeant, or Commander, or will work as suspects defending themselves as innocent. Participants (if they are suspects) will typically receive a criminal case ahead of time, which includes the facts of the crime, their roles, alibis and pieces of evidence. Students taking roles as suspects must prepare and memorize the cases given to them. During model crime investigation sessions, participants working as Police, not knowing who the actual criminal(s) is (are), must gather these pieces of evidence through investigating, interrogating and interviewing suspects in order to find out who the offender(s) is(are).

== Organization ==
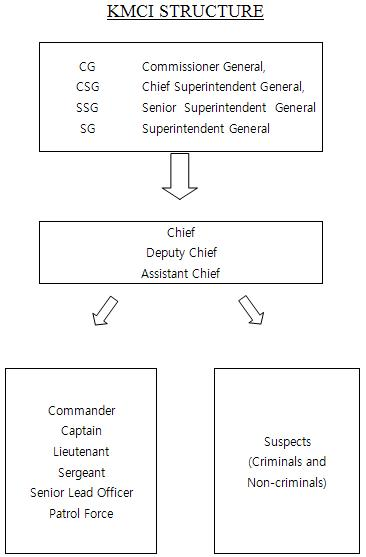
The organization of KMCI

Whole committees are supervised and controlled by students role-playing as Generals:
Commissioner General, Chief Superintendent General, Senior superintendent general, Superintendent General.

Commissioner General	Georgetown University
Chief Superintendent General	Princeton University
Senior Superintendent General	Georgetown University
Superintendent General	New York University

(University of Students who took role as Generals in 2009 Korea Model Crime Investigations)

Each session is operated by students following roles as Chiefs:
Chief of Police, Deputy Chief, and Assistant Chief

Participants will be designated in the following committees randomly

- Federal Bureau of Investigation
- U.S. Marshals Service
- Drug Enforcement Administration
- Bureau of Alcohol, Tobacco, Firearms and Explosives and
- Department of Homeland Security

And be given the roles in POLICE as
Commander, Captain, Lieutenant, Sergeant, Senior Lead Officer, Patrol Force

, OR be given the roles in SUSPECT as
Criminal, Accomplice, Witness, and so on (Types of roles are subjected to be changed according to a criminal case of committee, and participants’ role must be kept fugitive by themselves.)

== Goals ==
Police and Suspects has different goal of their own. As mentioned above, police should find out actual offenders by summarizing evidences given by suspects. Suspects should not let police to find about who the actual criminal is. Whoever achieves their goal is to win.

=== Role as Police ===
By going through procedures step by step, police officers have to find out the actual criminal, or criminals. All officers shall strictly adhere to the policy of the KMCI prior to any interrogation of suspects. No coercion, threats or promises shall be used under any condition to obtain a confession, statement, or admission from any individual. The immediate objective of the interviewing officer should be to establish a cooperative relationship. To this objective, an officer should: display a sincere interest, be patient and tactful, be respectful, control personal feelings, and provide reassurance.

=== Role as a Suspect ===
Participants can be designated as a criminal, accomplice or as a witness. They are able to lie about their positions in order to confuse police, but their evidences should match with the stances Chiefs provides several weeks before session. Suspects’ positions MUST be kept in a secret before sessions start. Actual number of criminals among suspects can vary from zero to all. Suspects making a speech, refusing interrogation or getting an interview should: display utmost respect, be kind to interviewers, cooperate interview as much as interviewee wants to, and never distort their evidence.

== Investigation ==
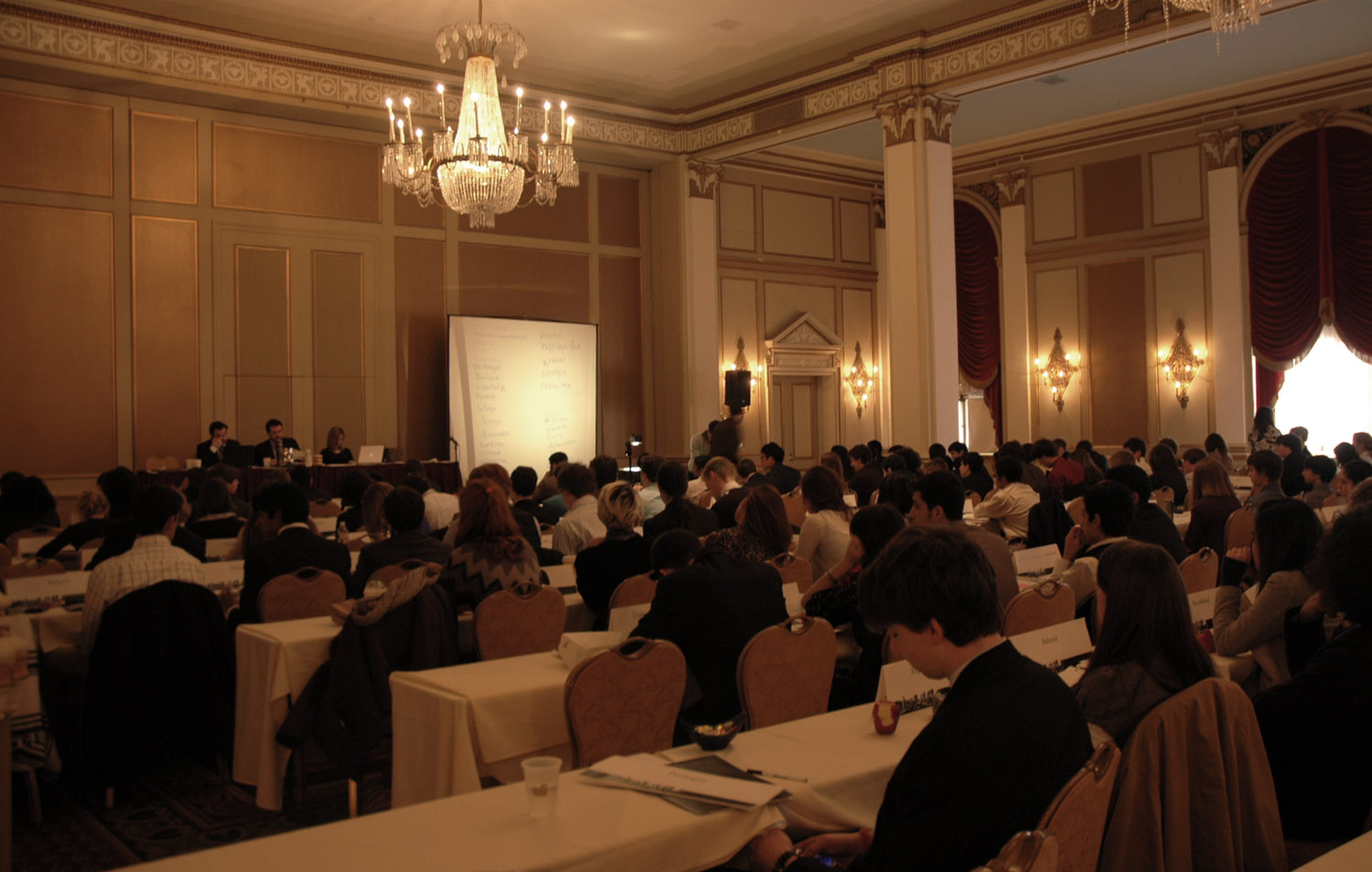
An international Student Conference: Debate Sessions

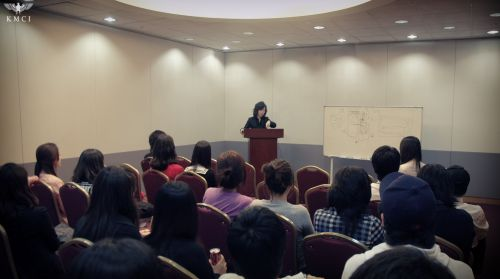
KMCI participants: A student delivering his speech

Investigation procedures are the only way which investigators can find valuable evidences. These investigations are divided into two parts: Preliminary investigation, and Follow-up investigation.

=== Preliminary investigation ===
Most preliminary investigations will be conducted by the members of Patrol Force since they usually are the first to arrive at the criminal scene. All officers designated to conduct preliminary investigation shall do their utmost to gather as much information as possible during this stage of investigation since its police department's the very first stage figuring out the information of suspects. The officers responsible for a preliminary investigation shall interrogate the suspect, find out personal information about the suspect such as, but not limited to age, address, phone number, family members, and shall report the incident fully and accurately and yield the responsibility to the follow-up investigators.

=== Follow-up Investigation ===
Follow-up investigation will be preceded by the Senior Lead Officer, Sergeant and Lieutenant because they are usually responsible for deeper investigations. It may be possible for the patrol force to conduct follow-up investigations, but the priority is given to other class officers. In this stage of investigation, police department would try to figure out more concrete and detailed information about the offenses and the suspects as thorough as possible, including following steps, although all of the steps may not be necessary in each case: review and analyze all previous reports prepared in the preliminary phase: conduct additional interviews with suspects, and preliminary investigating officers if necessary, conduct interrogations of all suspects, plan, organize and conduct crime scene searches for the purpose of gathering additional evidences: check criminal records of potential suspects: identify and apprehend suspects and: interview apprehended suspects in order to determine involvement in other crimes.

== Debate ==
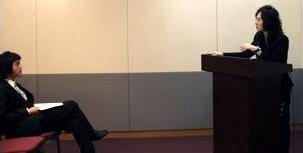
A student is interrogating virtual suspect during preliminary investigation

Debate procedure incorporated UNA-USA format(United Nations Associations of United States of America) to foster active participation from students. Motions and points have to be introduced by participants to take an action in the committee, and the conference will be governed under the authority of student chiefs.

Introduction of an affidavit
Once an affidavit has been approved, copied, and distributed, a person/people may make a motion to introduce the affidavit. The Chief will recognize the affiant of the affidavit to read the paragraphs of the affidavit. The Chief, at his or her discretion, may allow the main signatories to answer any clarification points on the affidavit. for any reason. After that, the affiant has to express his/her reasons for supporting his/her own affidavit.

Speaker's list
When a speaking time designated for an affidavit elapse, the Chief will terminate his speech. After that, the floor will be yielded to the Chief who will open the floor to debate. Chief will entertain other suspects’ or police agents’ speeches. These speeches must include reasons for disagreeing or sometimes supporting the contents in the affidavit. (Affiant also can take the floor again as long as the Chief recognizes him/her.)

Closure of the debate
When total allotted debate time is almost elapsed, a session will have final speeches. Usually, a final speech lasts 1 minute for, and 1 minute against the affidavit. When the final speeches are over, the debate procedure will automatically be closed, and voting procedures will begin.

Introduction of an Affidavit
Statement from an Affiant
Speaker's List
Chief recognizes members to be added to the speaker's list once it is opened.

Members should send a note to the Chief in order to be added to the Speaker's List

Closure of Debate
Final Speeches: 1 minute for or 1 minute against the affidavit

== See also ==
- Model United Nations
- Americas Model United Nations
- Mock Trial
- Moot Court
- Model Congress
- Criminal procedure
- Criminal procedure in the United States
