= James Brannon House =

Historic house in Indiana, United States

- U.S. National Register of Historic Places
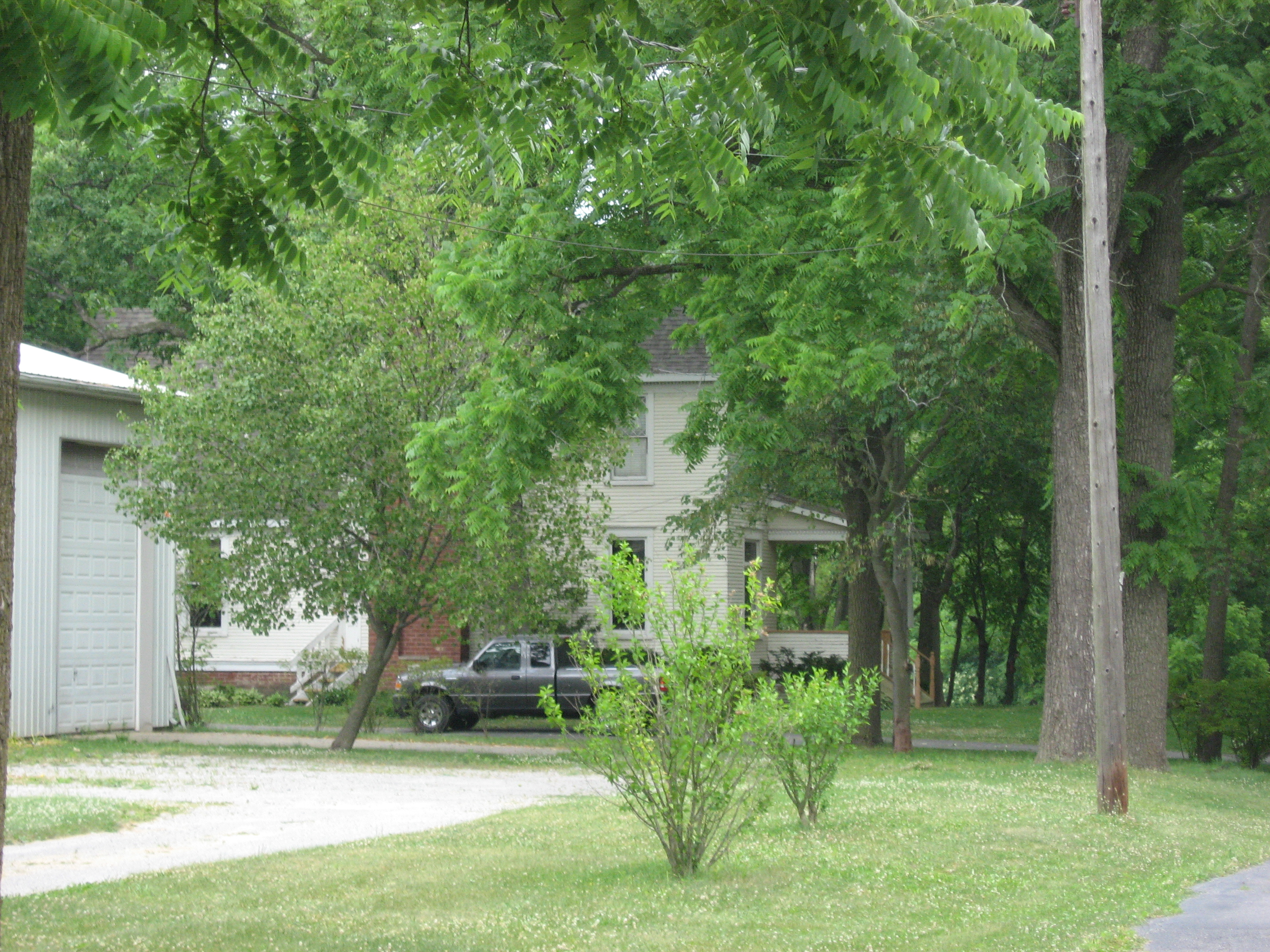
- James Brannon House, June 2012

- Location within Indiana Location within the United States
- Location: 260 Burnham St., Lowell, Indiana
- Coordinates: 41°17′42″N 87°24′53″W
- Area: 3.3 acres (1.3 ha)
- Built: 1898
- Architectural style: Queen Anne, Free Classic
- NRHP reference No.: 11000120
- Added to NRHP: March 21, 2011

James Brannon House is a historic home located at Lowell, Indiana. It was built in 1898, and is a two-story, Queen Anne / Free Classic style frame dwelling. It has clapboard siding and patterned wood shingles on the gable ends. It features a full-width front porch and several stained glass windows.

It was listed in the National Register of Historic Places in 2011.
