= J. Claude Rumsey House =

Historic house in Indiana, United States

- U.S. National Register of Historic Places
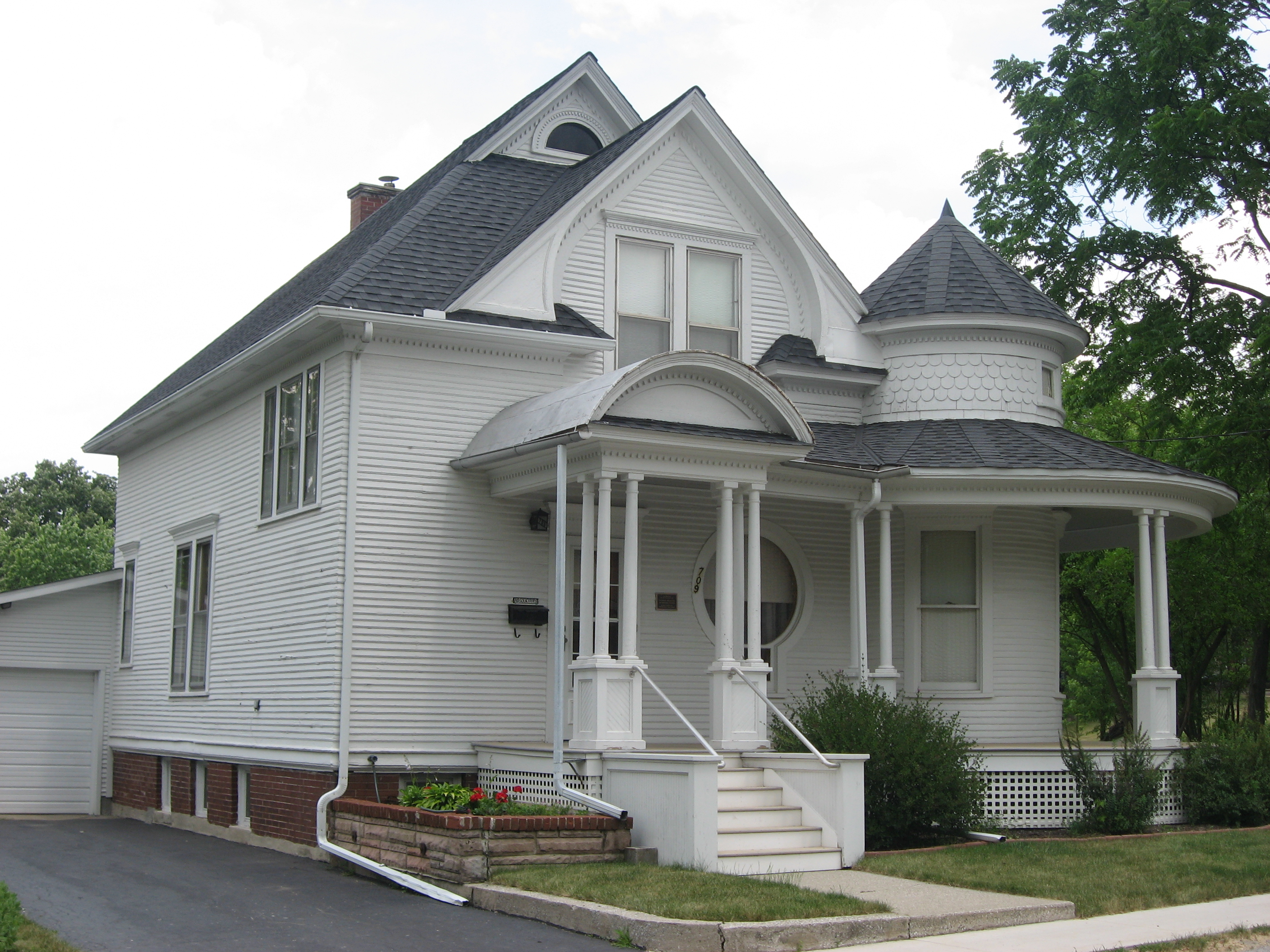
- J. Claude Rumsey House, June 2012

- Location within Indiana Location within the United States
- Location: 709 Michigan Ave., Lowell, Indiana
- Coordinates: 41°17′44″N 87°24′59″W
- Area: less than one acre
- Built: 1906
- Built by: Rumsey, J. Claude
- Architectural style: Queen Anne
- NRHP reference No.: 08001211
- Added to NRHP: December 22, 2008

J. Claude Rumsey House, also known as the Rumsey-Nomanson House, is a historic home located at 709 Michigan Avenue in Lowell, Indiana. It was built in 1906, and is a 2-story, Queen Anne stick built home with a cross-gable roof. It sits on a concrete foundation, which was quite modern at the time, and features a round corner tower with fishscale shingles and a wraparound porch.

It was listed in the National Register of Historic Places in 2008.
