= Mary Emma Allison =

American school librarian

- Born: March 5, 1917
- Died: October 27, 2010 (aged 93); Lowell, Indiana
- Education: Wheaton College

Mary Emma Allison (March 5, 1917 – October 27, 2010) was an American school librarian who co-created Trick-or-Treat for UNICEF in 1950. Her three children were the initial participants in the fund raising effort, which by the time of her death had brought in $160 million to be used for the benefit of needy children around the world.

== Early life and career ==
Born Mary Emma Woodruff in 1917, she earned her undergraduate degree at Wheaton College. After working as a school teacher, she majored in library science for her master's degree and was employed as a librarian in a Chicago school.

While living with her family in Philadelphia, she and her husband Clyde Allison, a Presbyterian minister, collected clothing and items for the Church World Service to be distributed in Europe as humanitarian aid for refugees in the aftermath of World War II.

== Trick-or-Treat for UNICEF ==
As the post-WWII collections effort was winding down, Allison attended a children's costume parade in late 1949 and followed the children and a cow into Wanamaker's department store in Center City, Philadelphia. While in the store she saw a booth raising funds for UNICEF.

Together with her husband, Allison conceived of a program in which children would collect funds for UNICEF as part of their Halloween trick-or-treating. Her husband publicized the program in a magazine he edited that went to Sunday school teachers before Halloween 1950 suggesting that children collect money in empty milk cartons to help raise money to pay for powdered milk to be sent overseas and their children collected $17 that first year. The U.S. Fund for UNICEF took over the program on a formal basis starting in 1953, with children collecting money door-to-door in orange boxes designed for that purpose. By the time of Allison's death, the program had raised $160 million to benefit children in need.

== Death ==
A resident of Lowell, Indiana, Allison died at her home there, aged 93, on October 27, 2010, days before the 60th anniversary of the fundraising program. She was survived by a son, two daughters, four grandchildren and four great-grandchildren.
