= Charles E. Nichols House =

Historic house in Indiana, United States

- U.S. National Register of Historic Places
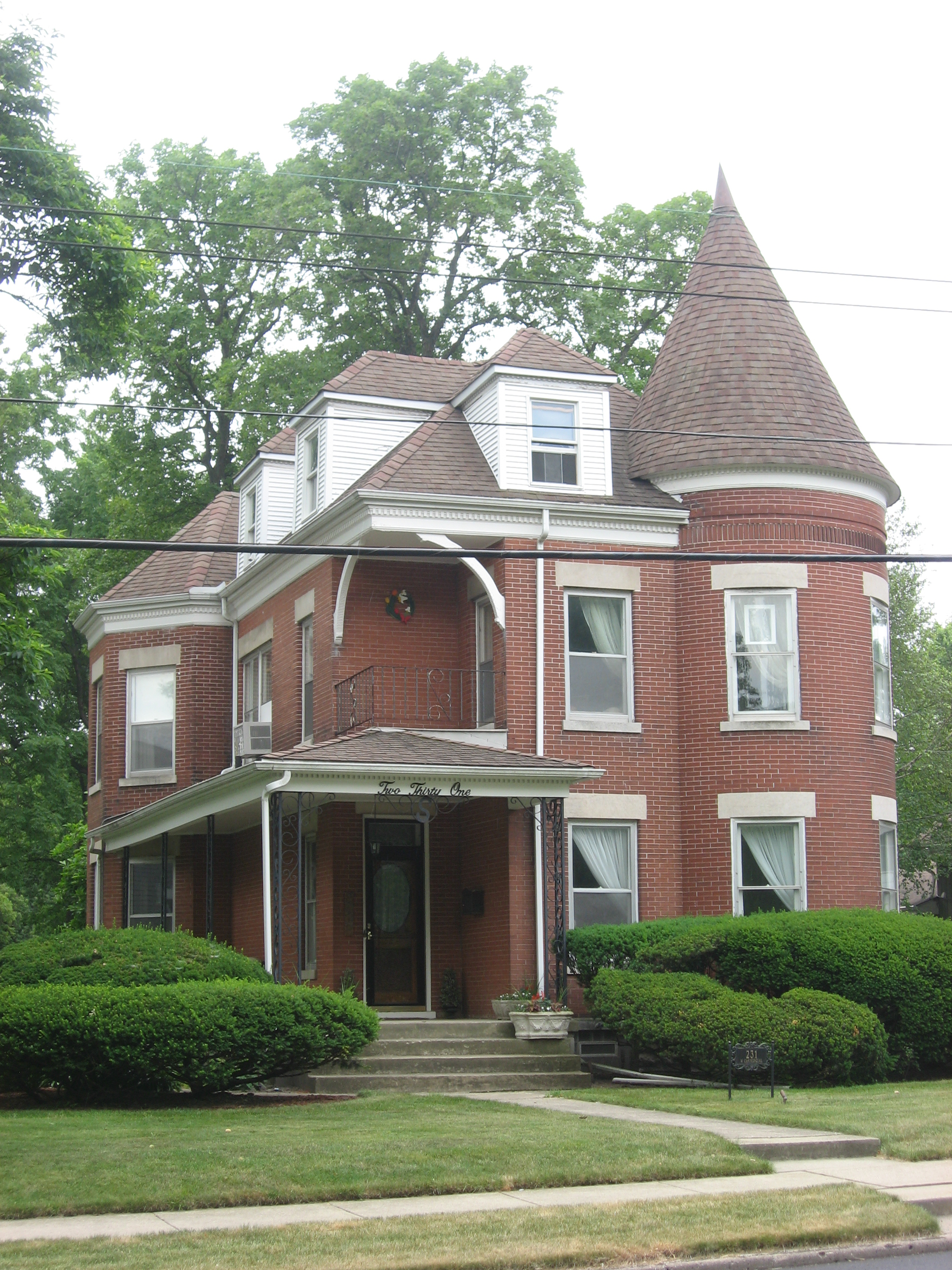
- Charles E. Nichols House, June 2012

- Location within Indiana Location within the United States
- Location: 231 W Commercial Ave, Lowell, Indiana
- Coordinates: 41°17′23″N 87°25′39″W
- Area: less than one acre
- Built: 1902
- Architectural style: Romanesque, Queen Anne
- NRHP reference No.: 10000375
- Added to NRHP: June 24, 2010

Charles E. Nichols House is a historic home located at Lowell, Indiana. It was built in 1902, and is a 2 1/2-story, Queen Anne style brick dwelling with a cross hipped roof. It features a stately corner tower with conical roof, side bay windows, and a bracketed balcony over the front entrance. Also on the property is a contributing carriage house.

It was listed in the National Register of Historic Places in 2010.
