= UNICEF Tap Project =

United Nations' campaign

UNICEF Tap Project was created in 2007

The UNICEF Tap Project was a nationwide campaign that provides children in impoverished nations with access to safe, clean water. The campaign culminated during World Water Week, celebrating the United Nations' World Water Day, March 30.

This campaign involved restaurants, dining patrons, students, and volunteers along with corporate, community, celebrity, and government supporters. During World Water Week restaurants across the United States encouraged patrons to donate $1 or more for the tap water they usually enjoy for free. In tandem, UNICEF Tap Project volunteers support their efforts by conducting local fundraising events and activities.

Today, nearly 990 million people worldwide are without access to safe and clean drinking water. Meanwhile, every day 4,100 children die from water related diseases. The UNICEF Tap Project helps support UNICEF's work towards the Millennium Development Goals – Goal 7 – which is to halve'16 flats, by 2015, the proportion of the population without sustainable access to safe drinking water and basic Producted.

The project was retired by UNICEF USA in March 2016.

== History ==
The UNICEF Tap Project was created in 2007 by a New York City based advertising/communications agency called Droga5 and launched on May, 2001 – World Water Day. The concept was to encourage patrons to donate $1 or more for the tap water they usually enjoy for free. The funds would go towards providing impoverished children with clean drinking water; with $1, UNICEF can provide a child with access to clean, safe water for 15'to days. That first year the campaign was only on World Water Day, since then it has centered on World Water Week.

The first Tap Project that took place in New York City had the support of thousands of patrons at over three hundred restaurants, which helped to raise about $100,000 in funds. Since 2007, the UNICEF Tap Project has raised nearly $2.5 million for water and sanitation programs for children.

== Destination of funds ==
The UNICEF Tap Project funds raised throughout the campaign go towards different UNICEF programs that include water, hygiene and sanitation programs. Money raised through the Tap Project has helped children, to have access to clean water, in countries like Belize, Guatemala, the Central African Republic, Ivory Coast, Haiti, Iraq, Togo and Vietnam. Some of these programs, that aim to improve children's lives, include: drilling of wells, the installation of water pumps, building latrines in impoverished communities, and classes that teach lifesaving hygiene to school children and their families. The Tap Project campaign also includes programs that support rainwater harvesting and affordable water filters.

Country that has received aid	year
Angola	2007
Belize	2008, 2009
Central African Republic	2010, 2011
Ivory Coast	2008, 2009
Guatemala	2010
Haiti	2010
Iraq	2007, 2008, 2009
Laos	2007
Nicaragua	2008, 2009
Togo	2010, 2011
Vietnam	2010, 2011

== National sponsors ==
Since 2007, UNICEF Tap Project has had various sponsors that have collaborated to the campaign. In 2010, Giorgio Armani created the campaign "Acqua for Life". This campaign incorporated the use of his fragrance "Acqua di Giò" for men, through which he raised awareness and funds towards the Tap Project. In 2011, Armani expanded his campaign by adding the women's fragrance called "Acqua di Gioia". Giorgio Armani donates $1 for every purchased bottle of these two fragrances, during the month of March. The campaign takes into account bottles purchased within the 50 U.S. states, Puerto Rico and Washington D.C.

Turner Broadcasting System has participated in the Tap Project campaign for four consecutive years. This organization sponsors UNICEF Tap Project Volunteer Program by providing funds to aid in the recruitment and training of volunteers, resources and free advertisement to raise awareness for the Tap Project campaign.

Droga5 is an advertising agency created in 2006 and partnered with the UNICEF in 2007 to aid with the Tap Project campaign. Droga5 creates promotional material that supports the initiative, by promoting the project in various media prior and during World Water Week, which brings awareness about the UNICEF Tap Project's efforts to help with the water crisis around the world.

eBay joined the UNICEF's efforts towards providing clean and safe water to children around the world through the Tap Project in 2009. The company created a campaign called GivingWorks, in which eBay gives its customers and sellers the opportunity to donate a percentage of their profit made through eBay. People can also donate money when checking out products or shop listings that support the cause.

The UNICEF Tap Project also relies on the promotional help of different providers like MediaVest USA, American Express, Zagat Survey, OpenTable, SeamlessWeb and Yelp, Inc. These companies provide free advertising and media exposure to the campaign.

=== Celebrity Tap ===
Celebrity Tap Set

In order to increase its funds towards the Tap Project, in 2011, UNICEF created Celebrity Tap, which consisted of packing water from the faucets of celebrities' homes into fancy bottles. For every $5 donated through the Tap Project website, participants were entered for a chance to win a case of the luxury celebrity tap water.

The money raised from Celebrity Tap was used to provide children with clean and safe water around the world. Some of the celebrities participating in this project were Selena Gomez, Taylor Swift, Robin Williams, Dwight Howard, Rihanna and Adrian Grenier. Aside from providing water from their own home, celebrities that participated in this project volunteered their time for commercials and advertising campaigns to promote the UNICEF Tap Project.

=== UNICEF Tap Project 2014 ===
In 2014, UNICEF launched a new campaign challenging users to go without something far less vital than clean water—their cell phones. By going to the Tap Project website on their smartphones, users were challenged to not touch their phone for as long as they could. For every 15 minutes they went, UNICEF's sponsors donated the monetary equivalent of one day of water to help children in need.

The project garnered over 2.6 million users that spent on average over an hour on the site, raising $1.6 million from a grand total of over 250 million minutes gone without phones.

== Achievements ==
=== Awards ===
Since its implementation in 2007, the UNICEF Tap Project has gained public recognition by various organizations, which have granted the project prizes and awards. In June 2007, the Tap project won the Titanium Lion, at the Cannes Lions International Advertising Festival in France, for creative innovation.

In 2008, the Tap Project was awarded with the distinction of Gold by The Advertising Club of New York's International ANDY Awards, for Public Service and with Silver for Integrated Branding.(Gold / 2008 Richard T. O. Reilly) for Public Service Also, in the same year Jay Aldous, who is the former Chief Marketing and Communications Officer for the U.S. Fund for UNICEF, was co-recipient of the inaugural Non-profit Marketer of the Year award from the American Marketing Association and the American Marketing Association Foundation.

=== Notable media ===
- Top Chef Masters – Marcus Samuelsson won, with the UNICEF Tap Project as his benefiting charity
- Dr. Phil
- The Ellen DeGeneres Show
- The Rachael Ray Show
- The Martha Stewart Show
