= Droga5 =

American advertising agency

- Industry: Advertising; Marketing
- Founded: 2006
- Founder: David Droga
- Headquarters: Manhattan, New York, United States
- Number of locations: 3
- Area served: Worldwide
- Parent: Accenture Song
- Website: droga5.com

Droga5 is an advertising agency headquartered in New York City in United States. It was founded in 2006 by David Droga.

== History ==
David Droga founded Droga5 in New York City in 2006. Droga said that he named the agency after the tag his mother used to sew into his clothes (He is the fifth of six children and his mother stitched labels in her children's clothing based on birth order).

In 2008, Droga5 opened a second office in Sydney in David Droga's homeland of Australia; this office was closed in September 2015 as Droga5 turned its focus to the European market and its London office, which opened in 2013.

In July 2013, William Morris Endeavor purchased a 49% share in Droga5. According to The New York Times, "executives from both companies said the partnership would allow them to create more brand-supported content by combining their significant advertising and entertainment resources."

The sale of Droga5 to Accenture Song was announced in April 2019. WME Dragon Holdings LLC agreed on March 29, 2019, to sell its 49 percent interest to Accenture Interactive for $233 million. This assumed a value of $242.5 million for the 51 percent share owned by David5, LLC, identified in the Endeavor Group Holdings IPO filing as the majority owner.

Dublin advertising agency Rothco, acquired by Accenture in 2018, was rebranded "Droga5 Dublin" in 2022. In 2024, Droga5 integrated Australian creative agency The Monkeys and also acquired Brazilian agency Soko, amidst a series of departures of prominent staff.
