= Trick-or-Treat for UNICEF =

Fundraiser for children's charity

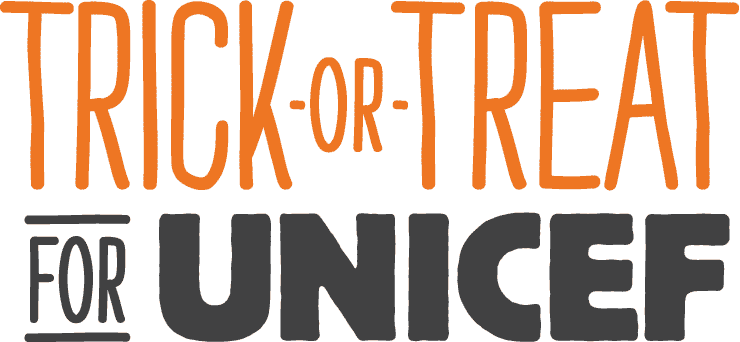
Logo for the campaign Trick-or-Treat for UNICEF

Trick-or-Treat for UNICEF is a fund-raising program for children sponsored by the U.S. Fund for UNICEF. Started on Halloween 1950 as a local event in Philadelphia, Pennsylvania, United States, the program historically involves the distribution of small orange boxes by schools to trick-or-treaters, in which they can solicit small change donations from the houses they visit. Millions of children in the United States, Canada, Ireland, Mexico, and Hong Kong participate in Halloween-related fund-raising events for Trick-or-Treat for UNICEF, and the program has raised over US$188 million worldwide.

== History ==
Trick-or-Treat for UNICEF was invented by Mary Emma Allison. In 1949, the Allisons were living in Bridesburg, a neighborhood in Philadelphia. When Mrs. Allison saw a UNICEF booth collecting funds to send powdered milk to undernourished children around the world, she thought of getting children to collect donations for UNICEF instead of candy. Reverend Clyde Allison introduced the concept to local Presbyterian churches. On Halloween 1950, the Allisons recruited their own children and their communities to go door-to-door collecting nickels and dimes in decorated milk cartons to aid children in post-World War II Europe. They collected a total of $17 and donated all of it to UNICEF.

In 1953, the United States Committee for UNICEF, later renamed the U.S. Fund for UNICEF, started actively promoting the program. By the 1960s, the concept had expanded throughout the United States, with small orange collection boxes distributed to millions of trick-or-treaters. When UNICEF won the Nobel Peace Prize in 1965, U.S. President Lyndon B. Johnson said in his congratulatory letter: "Your UNICEF Trick or Treat Day has helped turn a holiday too often marred by youthful vandalism into a program of basic training in world citizenship." In 1967, Johnson declared Halloween, October 31, to be "UNICEF Day" in the United States; by 1969, 3.5 million American children were trick-or-treating for donations. Children (and adults) in the U.S. have collected more than $175 million for Trick-or-Treat for UNICEF. Donations to Trick-or-Treat for UNICEF support UNICEF's global programing, but in 2005, half of the proceeds were targeted to a domestic cause, aiding victims of Hurricane Katrina. In 2008, the U.S. Fund for UNICEF introduced mobile phone text message donations as well as a MySpace and Facebook page. In 2014, the U.S. Fund for UNICEF partnered with Crowdrise to expand the campaign's online presence, allowing participants to create personal fundraising web pages in addition to traditional door-to-door trick-or-treating.

Trick-or-Treat for UNICEF has also partnered with Coinstar to allow customers to submit their donations through Coinstar machines.

The program has also expanded outside of the United States. UNICEF in Canada began Trick-or-Treat for UNICEF in 1955. The campaign was rebranded after the Government of Canada declared October 31 of each year "National UNICEF Day" in 2000. In 2006, UNICEF Canada discontinued the collection box part of their program, focusing instead on in-classroom fundraising and community engagement. In 2015, UNICEF Canada celebrated 60 years of the National UNICEF Day program having raised more than CA$100 million.
