= U.S. Fund for UNICEF =

Non-profit organization in the United States for the United Nation Children's Fund

United States Fund for UNICEF
- Abbreviation: UNICEF USA
- Formation: December 31, 1947; 78 years ago
- Type: Children's Charity
- Tax ID no.: 13-1760110
- Purpose: children's rights, child survival and child development
- Headquarters: New York City
- President/CEO: Michael J. Nyenhuis
- Website: unicefusa.org
- Formerly called: United States Committee for the International Children's Emergency Fund; United States Committee for UNICEF

United States Fund for UNICEF, doing business as UNICEF USA, is a non-profit, non-governmental organization based in the United States that supports the United Nations Children's Fund (UNICEF). It was founded in 1947 by Helenka Pantaleoni and is the oldest of the 32 UNICEF National Committees, which support UNICEF through fundraising, advocacy and education. Since its inception, the organisation has provided approximately $12 billion in cash and gifts in kind to UNICEF and other non-governmental organisations.

== Campaigns ==
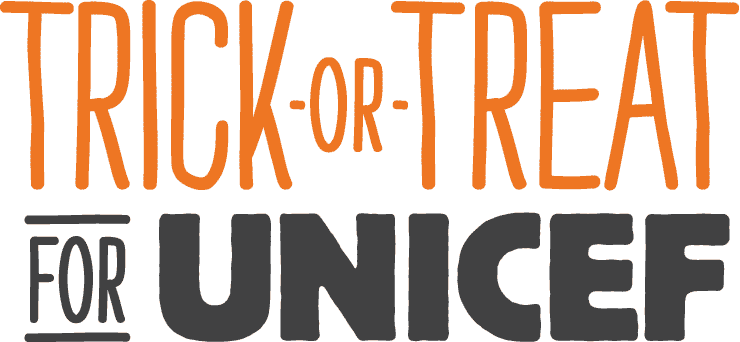
Trick-or-Treat for UNICEF logo

UNICEF USA administers the Trick-or-Treat for UNICEF campaign, which began as a local fundraising event in Pennsylvania in 1950. The campaign has raised approximately US$200 million to support UNICEF's programmes.

UNICEF USA also sponsored the UNICEF Tap Project, a campaign aimed at supporting access to safe drinking water. The Tap Project was launched in 2007 and concluded in 2016.

== Leadership ==
The President and Chief Executive Officer of UNICEF USA is Michael J. Nyenhuis. Members of the National Board of Directors include Bernard Taylor Sr. (Chair), Robert T. Brown (Vice Chair), Aaron Mitchell, Andrew Hohns, Brannigan Thompson, Carol J. Hamilton, Ewout Steenbergen, Glen Baptist, J. Stephen Eaton, John O'Farrell, Kelly Wilson, Ken Graboys, Lata N. Reddy, Laura Jones, Nicole Giles, Phillippe Gilbert, and Janet Truncale.

== Headquarters and offices ==
The U.S. Fund for UNICEF is headquartered in Manhattan, in New York City, and maintains five regional advisory boards: Atlantic, Central Plains, Midwest, Northeast, and West.

== Finances ==
UNICEF USA has received a four-star rating from Charity Navigator, its highest rating level. According to the organisation's published figures, 89 per cent of expenditures support programmes for children, 9 per cent are allocated to fundraising, and 2 per cent to administrative costs.

== Cards and gifts ==
The first UNICEF greeting card was created in 1949 and featured a "thank you" drawing by a seven-year-old girl whose village in Czechoslovakia received emergency assistance from UNICEF. The card initiated a fundraising activity that became a source of revenue for the organisation. In the United States, UNICEF greeting cards and related gifts are made available through the UNICEF Market website.

The U.S. Fund for UNICEF also supports the organisation through the UNICEF Inspired Gifts programme. Through this initiative, individuals may purchase supplies as therapeutic milk or insecticide-treated mosquito nets, which are distributed to countries and territories in which UNICEF operates.

== UNICEF Ambassadors ==
UNICEF USA has received support from celebrity ambassadors and other high-profile individuals who assist in promoting the organisation and supporting its advocacy and fundraising efforts. Current UNICEF USA ambassadors include Jeremy Lin, Aria Mia Loberti, Selena Gomez, Justin Min, Laurie Hernandez, Téa Leoni, Lucy Liu, P!nk, Alyssa Milano, and Sofia Carson.
