= Rothco =

Irish advertising agency

Droga5 Dublin
- Formerly: Rothco
- Company type: Private
- Industry: Advertising
- Founded: 1995; 31 years ago in Dublin, Ireland
- Headquarters: Dublin, Ireland
- Area served: Global
- Products: Brand development Strategy; Technology; Experience design
- Number of employees: 150 (2017)
- Parent: Accenture
- Website: droga5.ie

Rothco, later rebranded as Droga5 Dublin, is a creative and advertising agency based in Dublin, Ireland. The agency was founded in 1995, employs more than 150 people, and was acquired by Accenture in December 2017. Accenture, which also acquired the Droga5 agency in 2019, rebranded Rothco as "Droga5 Dublin" in 2022.

== Notable campaigns ==
=== AIB ===
- 'Mick and Kate' – Rothco was the creative agency behind AIB's 'Mick and Kate' mortgage campaign. The campaign became notable, in Ireland, for its focus on customers at the tail-end of the mortgage process.
- 'The Toughest' – Rothco's campaign for AIB to reposition the GAA Club Championships won several awards, spawned a series of TV specials, and was featured as a keynote talk during Cannes 2017.

=== Daintree Paper ===
- 'Shred of Decency' – Ahead of the Irish Same-Sex Marriage Equality Referendum, Rothco launched a campaign to turn anti-same-sex marriage flyers into confetti for same-sex marriages. The campaign won a Bronze Cannes Lion in 2015.

=== Defence Forces ===
- 'A New Dawn' – Rothco were the agency behind the Irish Defence Forces 'A New Dawn' campaign, a recruitment drive for 18-24 year olds. The campaign saw the Irish Defence Forces use the device of a 'realistic' first-person shooter game to attract over 3,600 applicants.

=== Tesco Ireland ===
- 'Big Can Be Good' – Rothco sought to reposition Tesco Ireland by focusing on the brand's reputed benefits to Irish communities.

== Awards ==
The company has won a number of awards, including several Cannes Lions awards.
