= Lake County, Indiana =

County in Indiana, United States

- County
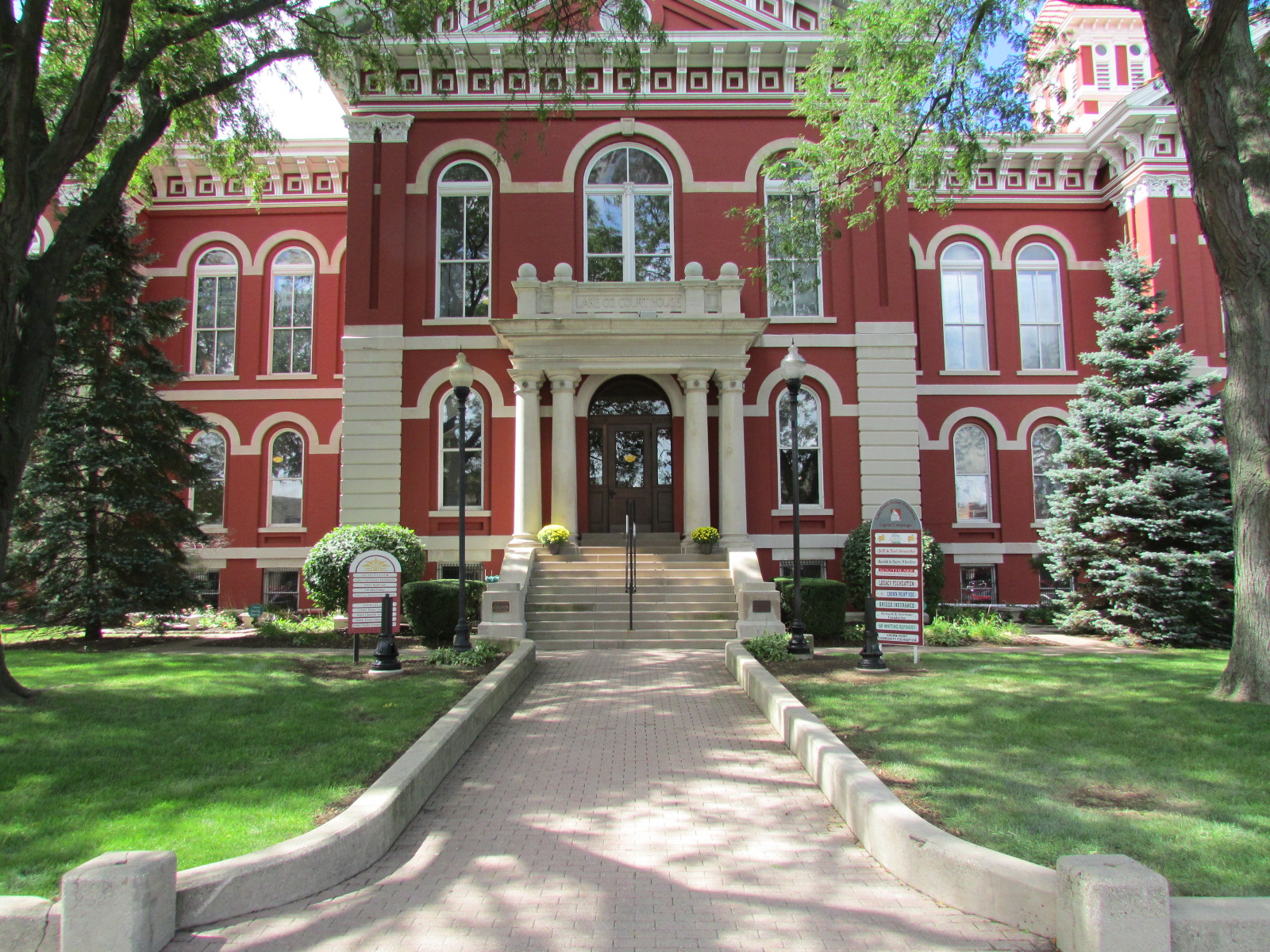
- The former Lake County Courthouse in Crown Point, Indiana

- Seal Logo

- Location in the state of Indiana

- Indiana's location in the U.S.
- Coordinates: 41°25′N 87°22′W
- Country: United States
- State: Indiana
- Region: Northwest Indiana
- Metro area: Chicago Metropolitan
- Settled: October 1834
- Established: February 16, 1837
- Named for: Lake Michigan
- County seat: Crown Point
- Largest city: Hammond (population); Gary (total area)
- Incorporated municipalities: 19 cities and towns: Cedar Lake (town); Crown Point (city); Dyer (town); East Chicago (city); Gary (city); Griffith (town); Hammond (city); Highland (town); Hobart (city); Lake Station (city); Lowell (town); Merrillville (town); Munster (town); New Chicago (town); Schererville (town); Schneider (town); St. John (town); Whiting (city); Winfield (town)

Government
  - Type: County
  - Body: Board of Commissioners
  - Commissioner: Kyle W. Allen, Sr. (D, 1st)
  - Commissioner: Jerry J. Tippy (R, 2nd)
  - Commissioner: Michael C. Repay (D, 3rd)
  - County Council: Members: David Hamm (D, 1st); Clorius Lay (D, 2nd); Charlie Brown (D, 3rd); Pete Lindemulder (R, 4th); Christine Cid (D, 5th); Ted F. Bilski (D, 6th); Randy Niemeyer (R, 7th)

Area
  - County: 626.5 sq mi (1,623 km^{2})
  - Land: 498.9 sq mi (1,292 km^{2})
  - Water: 127.6 sq mi (330 km^{2})
  - Metro: 10,874 sq mi (28,160 km^{2})
  - Rank: 12th largest county in Indiana
  - Region: 2,726 sq mi (7,060 km^{2})

Dimensions
  - Length: 36 mi (58 km)
  - Width: 16 mi (26 km)
- Elevation (mean): 663 ft (202 m)
- Highest elevation —NE Winfield Twp: 801 ft (244 m)
- Lowest elevation —at Lake Michigan: 585 ft (178 m)

Population (2020)
  - County: 498,700
  - Estimate (2025): 504,612 ▲
  - Rank: 2nd largest county in Indiana 131st largest county in U.S.
  - Density: 999.6/sq mi (385.9/km^{2})
  - Metro: 9,522,434
  - Region: 819,537
- Time zone: UTC−6 (Central)
  - Summer (DST): UTC−5 (Central)
- ZIP Codes: 46303, 46307–08, 46311–12, 46319–25, 46327, 46341–42, 46355–56, 46373, 46375–77, 46394, 46401–11
- Area code: 219
- FIPS code: 18-089
- GNIS feature ID: 0450495
- Website: lakecountyin.gov
- Indiana county number 45; Second most-populous county in Indiana

Lake County is a county located in the U.S. state of Indiana. In 2020, its population was 498,700, making it Indiana's second-most populous county. The county seat is Crown Point. The county is part of Northwest Indiana and the Chicago metropolitan area, and contains a mix of urban, suburban and rural areas.

It is bordered on the north by Lake Michigan and contains a portion of the Indiana Dunes. It includes Marktown, Clayton Mark's planned worker community in East Chicago.

== History ==
=== Early settlement ===
Originally inhabited by the Potawatomi, Lake County was established by European Americans on February 16, 1837. From 1832 to 1836 the area that was to become Lake County was part of La Porte County. From 1836 to 1837 it was part of Porter County. It was named for its location on Lake Michigan. The original county seat was Liverpool, but in 1840 Lake Court House, later renamed as Crown Point, was chosen.

Lake County's population grew slowly before the 1850s. Construction of railroads to link Chicago to the rest of the country stimulated rapid development, and tens of thousands of settlers and immigrants bought land in the region. Small-scale industrialization began, but was primarily relegated to the northern coast of the county, where it could take advantage of the railroads along the coast and shipping on the Great Lakes. The 1900 Census gives a population of 37,892 residents.

=== Industrialization and immigration ===
In 1903, Inland Steel Company established a plant in East Chicago and U.S. Steel founded one in Gary in 1906. With industrial jobs the demand for labor associated with industrial jobs, the county's population exploded. Immigrants poured into the area from all over Central and Eastern Europe. There was also a smaller Mexican immigrant community. Black and white migrants came from many regions of the United States, particularly Appalachia and the South. Mostly rural blacks went north in the Great Migration, seeking both industrial jobs and escape from Jim Crow violence and disenfranchisement in the South.

In 1930, Lake County's population surpassed 260,000, with first- and second-generation Americans constituting a majority of the population. The second wave of the Ku Klux Klan gained a large following here in the 1920s, as it did for a time in the rest of Indiana. The KKK organized against the numerous European immigrants, who were mostly Catholic. While the steel industry reigned supreme, other industries also found the county to be an ideal location for cheap land and well-developed transportation networks, such as automobiles, oil, chemicals, consumer goods, food processing, and construction supply companies.

The Great Depression was devastating to Lake County, as it was to other areas with economies based on heavy industry. The Depression, combined with industrial strife, changing demographics, and unionization, caused a realignment of politics in Lake County. It became a stronghold of the Democratic Party. Lake County has supported the Democratic nominee for president in every election since 1932. Exceptions occurred in 1956 and 1972. Indiana's 1st congressional district has elected Democratic candidates in every election since 1930.

World War II restored prosperity, as industry revived to support the war effort. Good economic times continued into the 1970s. During this period, unions helped industrial workers gain middle-class wages. In addition to attracting refugees and immigrants from Europe, black Americans and Mexicans migrated here in the postwar period in even higher numbers than in the 1910-1930 period. As minority populations exploded in such industrial cities as East Chicago and Gary, racial tensions surfaced again. Following construction of state and federal highways, development of cheaper land provided newer housing to middle-class people who could afford it. Both whites and established black families moved out of the aging industrial cities.

=== Recent history ===
Lake County's population peaked at 546,000 in 1970. Severe industrial decline took place during the 1973-1991 period, brought on by foreign competition, new management philosophies that called for major workforce reductions, and productivity gains from technology. The decline was particularly intense in the steel industry: steel employment exceeded 60,000 in the 1960s, and declined progressively to just 18,000 by 2015. Lake County's population declined 13% to bottom out at 475,000 in 1990.

The industrial decline of the 1980s cast a long shadow over Lake County: the county did not regain the level of employment it had in 1980 until 1996, after which the employment level roughly flatlined. The county's economic output peaked in 1978, and has not since recovered, remaining 15-20% below the peak after adjusting for inflation. As prosperity declined, so did the immigration that powered the county's explosive population growth before 1950: per the 2000 census, only 5.3% of Lake County's residents were foreign-born, compared to over 11% for the United States as a whole.

The population recovered somewhat during the 1990s and 2000s, as the local economy adjusted. Suburban growth has also been driven by commuter populations of workers who are employed in Chicago and commute via expressways or the South Shore Line. In 2007, it was estimated that 44,000 workers commuted from Lake County, Indiana, to Chicago for work. The decline of industrial cities and growth of suburbs has been so sharp, that by 1990 a majority of the county's population lived outside of the four traditional industrial cities. Lake County still continues to struggle with urban decline and poverty, suburban sprawl and traffic jams, and a stagnating population.

== Geography ==
The county has a total area of 626.56 square miles (1,622.8 km^{2}), of which 498.96 square miles (1,292.3 km^{2}) (or 79.63%) is land and 127.60 square miles (330.5 km^{2}) (or 20.37%) is water. It is the second-largest county in total area in Indiana, but has the largest water area of all 92 counties.

The northern and southern portions of the county (north of U.S. 30 and south of Lowell) are mainly low and flat, except for a few sand ridges and dunes and were both once very marshy and had to be drained. The lowest point, at 585 feet (178 m), is along the Lake Michigan shoreline.

The central part of the county is higher and hillier. As you travel south from the low and relatively flat lake plain in the northern part of the county, the land gradually rises in elevation until the peak of the Valparaiso Moraine. The highest point, at 801 feet (244 m), is in northeastern Winfield Township near 109th Street and North Lakeshore Drive in Lakes of the Four Seasons. From here the land descends south into the Kankakee Outwash Plain until the Kankakee River is reached.

The geographic center of Lake County is approximately 200 feet (60 m) northwest of Burr Street and West 113th Avenue in Center Township 41°24′53.8″N 87°24′14.3″W.

=== Adjacent counties ===
- Cook County, Illinois (northwest)
- Will County, Illinois (west)
- Kankakee County, Illinois (southwest)
- Porter County (east)
- Jasper County (southeast)
- Newton County (south)

=== National protected area ===
- Indiana Dunes National Park – also in LaPorte and Porter counties

=== Transit ===
- East Chicago Transit
- Gary Public Transportation Corporation (Broadway Metro Express)

=== Airports ===
- Gary/Chicago International Airport
- Griffith-Merrillville Airport

=== Major highways ===
Interstate 65 in Lake County is called the Casimir Pulaski Memorial Highway. Interstate 80/94/US 6 is the Frank Borman Expressway from the Illinois state line east to the Indiana Toll Road interchange in the eastern portion of the county. Interstate 94 has been referred to as the Chicago-Detroit Industrial Freeway. US 6 is part of the Grand Army of the Republic Highway.

Broadway (Indiana 53) is also the Carolyn Mosby Memorial Highway. Indiana 51 is known for its entire length as the Adam Benjamin Memorial Highway. US 30 is part of the historic Lincoln Highway. US 12 from Gary eastward is part of Dunes Highway. Cline Avenue (Indiana 912) from US 12 north and westward is known as the Highway Construction Workers Memorial Highway.

- I-65
- I-80
- I-90 Toll
- I-94
- US 6
- US 12
- US 20
- US 30
- US 41
- US 231
- SR 2
- SR 51
- SR 53
- SR 55
- SR 130 – former US 30
- SR 312 – former US 12
- SR 912 – former US 12

=== Railroads ===
- Amtrak
- Canadian National Railway
- Chicago, Fort Wayne and Eastern Railroad
- Chicago South Shore and South Bend Railroad
- CSX Transportation
- Gary Railway
- Indiana Harbor Belt Railroad
- Norfolk Southern Railway
- South Shore Line

== Municipalities ==

The municipalities in Lake County, and their populations in the 2020 Census, were:

=== Cities ===
- Crown Point – 33,899
- East Chicago – 26,370
- Gary – 69,093
- Hammond – 77,879
- Hobart – 29,752
- Lake Station – 13,235
- Whiting – 4,559

=== Towns ===
- Cedar Lake – 14,106
- Dyer – 16,517
- Griffith – 16,528
- Highland – 23,984
- Lowell – 10,680
- Merrillville – 36,444
- Munster – 23,894
- New Chicago – 1,999
- Schererville – 29,646
- Schneider – 269
- St. John – 20,303
- Winfield – 7,181

=== Census-designated places ===
- Lake Dalecarlia – 1,332
- Lakes of the Four Seasons – 3,936
  (7,091 including portion in Porter County)
- Leroy
- Ross
- Shelby – 453

=== Unincorporated communities ===
- Ainsworth
- Belshaw
- Brunswick
- Creston
- Deep River
- Deer Creek
- Klaasville
- Kreitzburg
- Leroy
- Liverpool
- New Elliott
- Orchard Grove
- Palmer
- Range Line
- Ross
- Southeast Grove

=== Townships ===
The 11 townships of Lake County, with their populations as of the 2020 Census, are:

- Calumet – 91,970
- Cedar Creek – 12,725
- Center – 38,630
- Eagle Creek – 1,719
- Hanover – 18,214
- Hobart – 40,652
- North – 156,686
- Ross – 48,529
- St. John – 68,972
- West Creek – 7,676
- Winfield – 12,927

== Economy ==
Despite the decline of heavy industry, manufacturing was still the largest employment sector in Lake County in 2010 with over 45,000 workers employed, followed closely by healthcare and social assistance at 44,000 workers, public administration at 40,000 workers, retail trade at 37,000 workers, accommodation and food services at 25,000 workers, and construction at 15,000 workers.

Lake County's GDP in 2010 was measured at nearly $25 billion. Manufacturing was also the largest sector of the economy in economic terms, contributing over $5.8 billion to the county's GDP in 2010. It was followed by healthcare and social assistance at $2.6 billion, public administration at $2.5 billion, and retail trade at $1.9 billion. While Lake County's average income was approximately 24% higher than the national average in 1978, in 2010 Lake County had fallen significantly behind the United States as a whole, with average income being approximately 12.9% lower. The national average surpassed Lake County sometime around 1986.

Businesses with the largest number of employees in the county are:

- Americall Group, Inc. – Hobart
- Ameristar Casino – East Chicago
- BP Whiting Refinery – Whiting
- Canadian National Railway – Whiting
- Cargill – Hammond
- Cleveland-Cliffs Indiana Harbor Works – East Chicago
- Community Hospital – Munster
- Franciscan Alliance, Inc. – locations throughout the region
- Franciscan Health Hammond – Hammond (closed)
- Hard Rock Casino Northern Indiana – Gary
- Horseshoe Casino – Hammond
- Majestic Star Casino – Gary (closed)
- Methodist Hospitals Northlake Campus – Merrillville
- NiSource – Merrillville
- Radisson Hotel at Star Plaza – Merrillville (closed)
- St. Catherine Hospital – East Chicago
- St. Mary Medical Center – Hobart
- Times Media Company – Munster
- Unilever – Whiting
- U.S. Steel Gary Works – Gary

== Education ==
=== Public school districts ===
The administration of public schools in Lake County is divided among 16 corporations and governing bodies, more than any other Indiana county.

- Crown Point Community School Corporation – Center and Winfield townships
- Gary Community School Corporation – City of Gary
- Griffith Public Schools – Town of Griffith
- Hanover Community School Corporation – Hanover Township
- Lake Central School Corporation – St. John Township
- Lake Ridge Schools Corporation – unincorporated Calumet Township
- Lake Station Community Schools – City of Lake Station
- Merrillville Community School Corporation – Ross Township
- River Forest Community School Corporation – Town of New Chicago and some portions of adjacent communities
- School City of East Chicago – City of East Chicago
- School City of Hammond – City of Hammond
- School City of Hobart – City of Hobart within Hobart Township
- School City of Whiting – City of Whiting
- School Town of Highland – Town of Highland
- School Town of Munster – Town of Munster
- Tri-Creek School Corporation – Cedar Creek, Eagle Creek and West Creek townships

=== Private schools ===
Elementary and secondary schools operated by the Diocese of Gary:

- Andrean High School, Merrillville (9–12)
- Aquinas School at St. Andrew's, Merrillville (PK–8)
- Bishop Noll Institute, Hammond (9–12)
- Our Lady of Grace, Highland (PK–8)
- St. Casimir, Hammond (PK–8)
- St. John Bosco, Hammond (PK–8)
- St. John the Baptist, Whiting (PK–8)
- St. John the Evangelist, St. John (PK–8)
- St. Mary, Crown Point (PK–8)
- St. Mary, Griffith (PK–8)
- St. Michael, Schererville (PK–8)
- St. Stanislaus, East Chicago (PK–8)
- St. Thomas More, Munster (PK–8)

Other parochial and private schools:

- St. Paul's Lutheran School, Munster (PK–8)
- Trinity Lutheran School, Crown Point (PK–8)
- Trinity Lutheran School, Hobart (PK–8)

=== Colleges and universities ===
- Calumet College of St. Joseph
- Hyles–Anderson College
- Indiana University Northwest
- Ivy Tech Community College
- Purdue University Northwest
- University of Phoenix
- Indiana Wesleyan University

== Public libraries ==
The county is served by seven different public library systems:

- Crown Point Community Library has its main location with a branch in Winfield.
- East Chicago Public Library has its main location and the Robart A. Pastrick branch.
- Gary Public Library has its main location, the Gary Public Library and Cultural Center, and the Kennedy and Woodson branches.
- Hammond Public Library
- Lake County Public Library has its main location in Merrillville as well as Cedar Lake, Dyer-Schererville, Griffith-Calumet Township, Highland, Hobart, Lake Station-New Chicago, Munster and St. John branches.
- Lowell Public Library has its main location with branches in Schneider and Shelby.
- Whiting Public Library

== Hospitals ==
- Community Hospital, Munster – 454 beds
- Franciscan Health Crown Point, Crown Point – 203 beds (Level III Trauma Center)
- Franciscan Health Dyer, Dyer – 223 beds
- Franciscan Health Munster, Munster – 63 beds
- Methodist Hospitals – 536 beds
  - Northlake Campus, Gary
  - Southlake Campus, Merrillville
- NW Indiana ER and Hospital, Hammond – 6 beds
- St. Catherine Hospital, East Chicago – 216 beds
- St. Mary Medical Center, Hobart – 215 beds
- UChicago Medicine Crown Point, Crown Point – 8 beds (opening April 2024)

== Media ==
The Times, based in Munster, is the largest daily newspaper in Lake County and Northwest Indiana and the second largest in the state. Lake County is also served by the Post-Tribune, a daily newspaper based in Merrillville.

Lakeshore Public Television operates WYIN-TV Gary on channel 56 and is the local PBS station in the Chicago television market.

These eight broadcast radio stations serve Lake County and are part of the Chicago market:

- WJOB (1230 AM) – Hammond
- WWCA (1270 AM) – Gary
- WLTH (1370 AM) – Gary
- WLPR (89.1 FM) – Lowell
- WRTW (90.5 FM) – Crown Point
- WPWX (92.3 FM) – Hammond
- WXRD (103.9 FM) – Crown Point
- WZVN (107.1 FM) – Lowell

== Climate and weather ==
Climate data for Lowell, Indiana (1981-2010 normals, extremes 1963-present)
Month	Jan	Feb	Mar	Apr	May	Jun	Jul	Aug	Sep	Oct	Nov	Dec	Year
Record high °F (°C)	66 (19)	73 (23)	85 (29)	91 (33)	95 (35)	104 (40)	101 (38)	104 (40)	98 (37)	92 (33)	77 (25)	70 (21)	104 (40)
Mean daily maximum °F (°C)	31.2 (−0.4)	35.8 (2.1)	47.5 (8.6)	60.8 (16.0)	71.3 (21.8)	80.7 (27.1)	83.8 (28.8)	82.0 (27.8)	76.4 (24.7)	63.6 (17.6)	49.4 (9.7)	35.1 (1.7)	59.8 (15.5)
Daily mean °F (°C)	22.8 (−5.1)	26.7 (−2.9)	37.4 (3.0)	49.3 (9.6)	59.8 (15.4)	69.7 (20.9)	73.1 (22.8)	71.1 (21.7)	64.2 (17.9)	51.9 (11.1)	40.2 (4.6)	27.1 (−2.7)	49.4 (9.7)
Mean daily minimum °F (°C)	14.4 (−9.8)	17.7 (−7.9)	27.4 (−2.6)	37.9 (3.3)	48.2 (9.0)	58.7 (14.8)	62.4 (16.9)	60.3 (15.7)	52.0 (11.1)	40.2 (4.6)	31.0 (−0.6)	19.1 (−7.2)	39.1 (3.9)
Record low °F (°C)	−28 (−33)	−23 (−31)	−9 (−23)	7 (−14)	26 (−3)	33 (1)	41 (5)	38 (3)	28 (−2)	18 (−8)	2 (−17)	−29 (−34)	−29 (−34)
Average precipitation inches (mm)	1.96 (50)	1.75 (44)	2.57 (65)	3.78 (96)	4.38 (111)	4.69 (119)	4 (100)	3.98 (101)	3.14 (80)	3.44 (87)	3.43 (87)	2.34 (59)	39.46 (999)
Average snowfall inches (cm)	8.8 (22)	8.2 (21)	3.4 (8.6)	0.3 (0.76)	0 (0)	0 (0)	0 (0)	0 (0)	0 (0)	0.2 (0.51)	0.7 (1.8)	7.7 (20)	29.3 (74.67)
Source: NOAA (normals, 1981–2010)

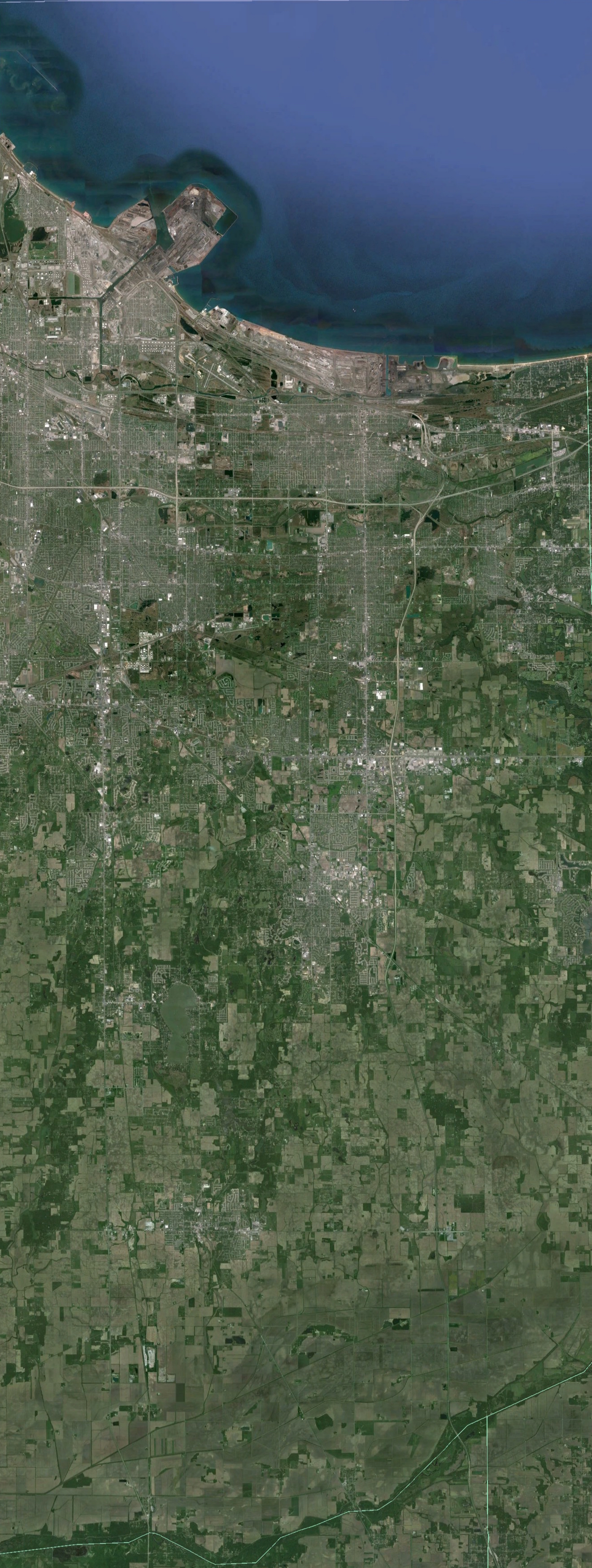
Satellite imagery of Lake County, IN, 2013

In recent years, average temperatures in Lowell have ranged from a low of 14.4 °F (−9.8 °C) in January to a high of 83.8 °F (28.8 °C) in July. A record low of −29 °F (−34 °C) was recorded in December 1989 and a record high of 104 °F (40 °C) was recorded in June 1988. Average monthly precipitation ranges from 1.75 inches (44 mm) in February to 4.69 inches (119 mm) in June. Temperatures at or below 0 °F (−18 °C) occur on average 11 days annually and exceed 90 °F (32 °C) degrees on 14 days.

In winter, lake-effect snow increases snowfall totals compared to the areas to the west. In spring and early summer, the immediate shoreline areas sometimes experience lake-breeze that can drop temperatures by several degrees compared to areas further inland. In summer, thunderstorms are common, occurring an average 40–50 days every year. On about 13 days, these thunderstorms produce severe winds.

== Government ==
The county government is a constitutional body, and is granted specific powers by the Constitution of Indiana, and by the Indiana Code.

County Council: The county council is the legislative branch of the county government and controls all the spending and revenue collection in the county. Representatives are elected from county districts. The council members serve four-year terms. They are responsible for setting salaries, the annual budget, and special spending. The council has limited authority to impose local taxes, in the form of an income and property tax that is subject to state level approval, excise taxes, and service taxes.

Board of Commissioners: The executive body of the county is made of a board of commissioners. The commissioners are elected in staggered four-year terms. Unlike most counties in Indiana, commissioners are elected based on their districts rather than being elected county-wide, with Marion and St Joseph being the other exceptions. One of the commissioners, typically the most senior, serves as president. The commissioners are charged with executing the acts legislated by the council, collecting revenue, and managing the day-to-day functions of the county government.

Court: The county maintains a small claims court that can handle some civil cases. The judge on the court is elected to a term of four years and must be a member of the Indiana Bar Association. The judge is assisted by a constable who is also elected to a four-year term. In some cases, court decisions can be appealed to the state level circuit court.

County Officials: The county has several other elected offices, including sheriff, coroner, auditor, treasurer, recorder, surveyor, and circuit court clerk Each of these elected officers serves a term of four years and oversees a different part of county government. Members elected to county government positions are required to declare party affiliations and to be residents of the county.

=== County elected officials ===
Board of Commissioners:

- Kyle W. Allen, Sr. (D, 1st)†
- Jerry J. Tippy (R, 2nd)
- Michael C. Repay (D, 3rd)

County Council:

- David Hamm (D, 1st)
- Ronald Brewer (D, 2nd)
- Charlie Brown (D, 3rd)
- Pete Lindemulder (R, 4th)
- Christine Cid (D, 5th)
- Ted F. Bilski (D, 6th)†
- Randy Niemeyer (R, 7th)

Elected Officials:

- Assessor: LaTonya Spearman (D)
- Auditor: Peggy Katona (D)
- Clerk: Michael Brown (D)
- Coroner: David Pastrick (D)
- Prosecutor: Bernard A. Carter (D)
- Recorder: Gina Pimentel (D)
- Sheriff: Oscar Martinez, Jr. (D)
- Surveyor: Bill Emerson, Jr. (D)
- Treasurer: John Petalas (D)

† President

== Politics ==
While the state of Indiana is strongly Republican, having voted Republican in all but one election since 1964, Lake County has long been a Democratic stronghold due to being part of the Chicago metropolitan area. It has given pluralities or majorities to Democrats in every presidential election since 1932 with the exceptions of 1956 and 1972. Like the rest of the Rust Belt, however, Lake County has recently trended Republican, with Donald Trump scoring the highest percentage of the vote since 1972 in the 2024 presidential election.

Lake is part of Indiana's 1st congressional district, which is held by Democrat Frank J. Mrvan. In the State Senate, Lake is part of the 1st, 2nd, 3rd and 6th districts, which are held by three Democrats and one Republican. In the Indiana House of Representatives, Lake is part of the 1st, 2nd, 3rd, 11th, 12th, 14th, 15th and 19th districts, which are held by four Democrats and four Republicans.

United States presidential election results for Lake County, Indiana
Year	Republican		Democratic		Third party(ies)	
Year	No.	%	No.	%	No.	%
1888	2,543	54.21%	2,068	44.08%	80	1.71%
1892	2,958	48.02%	3,010	48.86%	192	3.12%
1896	4,883	58.11%	3,418	40.68%	102	1.21%
1900	5,337	58.00%	3,733	40.57%	131	1.42%
1904	6,429	64.11%	2,933	29.25%	666	6.64%
1908	9,499	60.97%	5,502	35.32%	578	3.71%
1912	5,176	29.61%	5,136	29.38%	7,171	41.02%
1916	13,262	55.00%	9,946	41.25%	903	3.75%
1920	26,296	69.15%	7,136	18.77%	4,596	12.09%
1924	30,990	64.61%	10,918	22.76%	6,060	12.63%
1928	48,768	59.68%	32,321	39.55%	630	0.77%
1932	42,596	46.56%	46,060	50.34%	2,836	3.10%
1936	33,689	32.47%	68,551	66.07%	1,510	1.46%
1940	45,898	38.79%	71,985	60.83%	447	0.38%
1944	48,147	38.84%	75,066	60.56%	737	0.59%
1948	51,413	38.77%	77,025	58.09%	4,157	3.14%
1952	74,073	44.66%	90,721	54.70%	1,051	0.63%
1956	92,803	52.00%	85,000	47.63%	657	0.37%
1960	78,278	37.04%	132,554	62.72%	526	0.25%
1964	73,722	35.19%	134,978	64.42%	823	0.39%
1968	77,911	36.48%	99,897	46.77%	35,766	16.75%
1972	115,480	56.24%	88,510	43.10%	1,352	0.66%
1976	90,119	42.36%	120,700	56.74%	1,922	0.90%
1980	95,408	46.02%	101,145	48.78%	10,786	5.20%
1984	94,870	44.30%	117,984	55.10%	1,289	0.60%
1988	79,929	43.03%	105,026	56.55%	780	0.42%
1992	53,867	28.91%	102,778	55.17%	29,653	15.92%
1996	47,873	29.22%	100,198	61.15%	15,789	9.64%
2000	63,389	36.02%	109,078	61.98%	3,527	2.00%
2004	71,903	38.24%	114,743	61.03%	1,376	0.73%
2008	67,742	32.41%	139,301	66.64%	1,996	0.95%
2012	68,431	33.85%	130,897	64.75%	2,819	1.39%
2016	75,625	37.29%	116,935	57.66%	10,241	5.05%
2020	91,760	41.65%	124,870	56.67%	3,700	1.68%
2024	97,270	46.30%	109,086	51.92%	3,746	1.78%

=== 2008 presidential primary ===
In the 2008 Democratic presidential primary on May 6, 2008, Lake County was one of the last counties to report results. Lake County had reported no results at 11 p.m. ET, and at midnight ET, only 28% of Lake County's vote had been reported. A large number of absentee ballots and a record turnout delayed the tallies, and polls closed an hour later than much of the state because Lake County is in the Central Time Zone. Early returns showed Senator Barack Obama leading by a potentially lead-changing margin, leaving the race between Senator Hillary Clinton and Obama "too close to call" until final tallies were reported.

Crime

The NWI Times reported that over 800 registered sex offenders live in Lake and Porter Counties of Indiana in 2021.

== Culture and contemporary life ==
=== Entertainment and the arts ===
- Northwest Indiana Symphony Orchestra, concerts held at Living Hope Church – Merrillville
- Theatre at the Center, located at the Center for Visual and Performing Arts – Munster

=== Major attractions ===
- Ameristar Casino – East Chicago
- Horseshoe Casino – Hammond
- Majestic Star Casino – Gary
- Majestic Star Casino II – Gary
- Pierogi Fest – Whiting
- Southlake Mall – Hobart
- Three Floyds Brewing – Munster

=== Professional sports teams ===
- Gary SouthShore RailCats, an American Association professional baseball team, play their games at U.S. Steel Yard in Gary.

== Recreation ==
List of parks and recreational facilities – Lake County Parks and Recreation

- Bellaboo's Play and Discovery Center – Lake Station
- Buckley Homestead – Lowell
- Cedar Creek Family Golf Center – Cedar Lake
- Deep River County Park – Hobart
- Deep River Waterpark – Crown Point
- Gibson Woods Nature Preserve – Hammond
- Grand Kankakee Marsh – Hebron
- Lake Etta – Gary
- Lemon Lake – Crown Point
- Oak Ridge Prairie & Oak Savannah Trail – Griffith
- Stoney Run County Park – Hebron
- Three Rivers County Park – Lake Station
- Turkey Creek Golf Course – Merrillville
- Whihala Beach – Whiting

List of recreational facilities – Indiana Dunes National Park

- Calumet Prairie State Nature Preserve – Lake Station
- Hobart Prairie Grove – Hobart
- Hoosier Prairie State Nature Preserve – Griffith
- Paul H. Douglas Center for Environmental Education – Gary

== Demographics ==
Historical population
Census	Pop.	Note	%±
1840	1,468		—
1850	3,991		171.9%
1860	9,145		129.1%
1870	12,339		34.9%
1880	15,091		22.3%
1890	23,886		58.3%
1900	37,892		58.6%
1910	82,864		118.7%
1920	159,957		93.0%
1930	261,310		63.4%
1940	293,195		12.2%
1950	368,152		25.6%
1960	513,269		39.4%
1970	546,253		6.4%
1980	522,965		−4.3%
1990	475,594		−9.1%
2000	484,564		1.9%
2010	496,005		2.4%
2020	498,700		0.5%
2025 (est.)	504,612	▲	1.2%
U.S. Decennial Census; 1790-1960 1900-1990; 1990-2000 2010-2019

=== Racial and ethnic composition ===
Lake County, Indiana – Racial and ethnic composition Note: the US Census treats Hispanic/Latino as an ethnic category. This table excludes Latinos from the racial categories and assigns them to a separate category. Hispanics/Latinos may be of any race.
Race / Ethnicity (NH = Non-Hispanic)	Pop 1980	Pop 1990	Pop 2000	Pop 2010	Pop 2020	% 1980	% 1990	% 2000	% 2010	% 2020
White alone (NH)	349,878	312,113	293,457	274,162	251,106	66.90%	65.63%	60.56%	55.27%	50.35%
Black or African American alone (NH)	125,064	115,340	121,372	125,506	121,048	23.91%	24.25%	25.05%	25.30%	24.27%
Native American or Alaska Native alone (NH)	665	697	854	913	691	0.13%	0.15%	0.18%	0.18%	0.14%
Asian alone (NH)	2,076	2,637	3,862	5,981	7,334	0.40%	0.55%	0.80%	1.21%	1.47%
Native Hawaiian or Pacific Islander alone (NH)	x	x	106	63	95	x	x	0.02%	0.01%	0.02%
Other race alone (NH)	1,350	281	450	463	1,682	0.26%	0.06%	0.09%	0.09%	0.34%
Mixed race or Multiracial (NH)	x	x	5,335	6,254	16,817	x	x	1.10%	1.26%	3.37%
Hispanic or Latino (any race)	43,932	44,526	59,128	82,663	99,927	8.40%	9.36%	12.20%	16.67%	20.04%
Total	522,965	475,594	484,564	496,005	498,700	100.00%	100.00%	100.00%	100.00%	100.00%

==== Racial / Ethnic Profile of places in Lake County, Indiana (2020 census) ====
Racial / Ethnic Profile of places in Lake County, Indiana (2020 Census)
Following is a table of towns and census designated places in Lake County, Indiana. Data for the United States (with and without Puerto Rico), the state of Indiana, and Lake County itself have been included for comparison purposes.
The majority racial/ethnic group is coded per the key below. Communities that extend into and adjacent county or counties are delineated with a ‡ followed by an accompanying explanatory note. The full population of each community has been tabulated including the population in adjacent counties.

Majority minority with no dominant group
Majority White
Majority Black
Majority Hispanic
Majority Asian

Racial and ethnic composition of places in Lake County, Indiana (2020 Census) (NH = Non-Hispanic) Note: the US Census treats Hispanic/Latino as an ethnic category. This table excludes Latinos from the racial categories and assigns them to a separate category. Hispanics/Latinos may be of any race.
Place	Designation	Total Population	White alone (NH)	%	Black or African American alone (NH)	%	Native American or Alaska Native alone (NH)	%	Asian alone (NH)	%	Pacific Islander alone (NH)	%	Other race alone (NH)	%	Mixed race or Multiracial (NH)	%	Hispanic or Latino (any race)	%
United States of America (50 states and D.C.)	x	331,449,281	191,697,647	57.84%	39,940,338	12.05%	2,251,699	0.68%	19,618,719	5.92%	622,018	0.19%	1,689,833	0.51%	13,548,983	4.09%	62,080,044	18.73%
United States of America (50 states, D.C., and Puerto Rico)	x	334,735,155	191,722,195	57.28%	39,944,624	11.93%	2,252,011	0.67%	19,621,465	5.86%	622,109	0.19%	1,692,341	0.51%	13,551,323	4.05%	65,329,087	19.52%
Indiana	State	6,785,528	5,121,004	75.47%	637,500	9.39%	12,938	0.19%	166,651	2.46%	2,761	0.04%	25,139	0.37%	265,344	3.91%	554,191	8.17%
Lake County	County	498,700	251,106	50.35%	121,048	24.27%	691	0.14%	7,334	1.47%	95	0.02%	1,682	0.34%	16,817	3.37%	99,927	20.04%
Crown Point	City	33,899	25,326	74.71%	2,419	7.14%	41	0.12%	961	2.83%	2	0.01%	87	0.26%	1,148	3.39%	3,915	11.55%
East Chicago	City	26,370	1,600	6.07%	10,375	39.34%	39	0.15%	57	0.22%	7	0.03%	73	0.28%	355	1.35%	13,864	52.57%
Gary	City	69,093	6,374	9.23%	54,660	79.11%	112	0.16%	124	0.18%	11	0.02%	390	0.56%	2,201	3.19%	5,221	7.56%
Hammond	City	77,879	23,674	30.40%	19,584	25.15%	112	0.14%	611	0.78%	21	0.03%	287	0.37%	2,248	2.89%	31,342	40.24%
Hobart	City	29,752	19,695	66.20%	2,695	9.06%	53	0.18%	349	1.17%	10	0.03%	75	0.25%	1,245	4.18%	5,630	18.92%
Lake Station	City	13,235	7,613	57.52%	647	4.89%	26	0.20%	35	0.26%	1	0.01%	62	0.47%	655	4.95%	4,196	31.70%
Whiting	City	4,559	2,027	44.46%	144	3.16%	0	0.00%	23	0.50%	2	0.04%	13	0.29%	112	2.46%	2,238	49.09%
Cedar Lake	Town	14,106	11,966	84.83%	59	0.42%	22	0.16%	66	0.47%	3	0.02%	31	0.22%	695	4.93%	1,264	8.96%
Dyer	Town	16,517	12,520	75.80%	592	3.58%	14	0.08%	640	3.87%	1	0.01%	41	0.25%	464	2.81%	2,245	13.59%
Griffith	Town	16,528	9,805	59.32%	2,784	16.84%	18	0.11%	135	0.82%	1	0.01%	59	0.36%	662	4.01%	3,064	18.54%
Highland	Town	23,984	16,411	68.42%	1,793	7.48%	22	0.09%	415	1.73%	2	0.01%	67	0.28%	805	3.36%	4,469	18.63%
Lowell	Town	10,680	9,156	85.73%	91	0.85%	15	0.14%	42	0.39%	2	0.02%	22	0.21%	471	4.41%	881	8.25%
Merrillville	Town	36,444	10,827	29.71%	18,262	50.11%	56	0.15%	486	1.33%	5	0.01%	116	0.32%	1,317	3.61%	5,375	14.75%
Munster	Town	23,894	16,343	68.40%	1,456	6.09%	25	0.10%	1,517	6.35%	5	0.02%	56	0.23%	770	3.22%	3,722	15.58%
New Chicago	Town	1,999	1,167	58.38%	88	4.40%	3	0.15%	17	0.85%	1	0.05%	15	0.75%	93	4.65%	615	30.77%
Schererville	Town	29,646	21,092	71.15%	2,373	8.00%	41	0.14%	1,018	3.43%	12	0.04%	77	0.26%	981	3.31%	4,052	13.67%
Schneider	Town	269	246	91.45%	3	1.12%	0	0.00%	0	0.00%	0	0.00%	3	1.12%	9	3.35%	8	2.97%
St. John	Town	20,303	16,359	80.57%	634	3.12%	34	0.17%	354	1.74%	1	0.00%	72	0.35%	626	3.08%	2,223	10.95%
Winfield	Town	7,181	5,257	73.21%	448	6.24%	5	0.07%	241	3.36%	5	0.07%	29	0.40%	237	3.30%	959	13.35%
Lake Dalecarlia	CDP	1,332	1,196	89.79%	4	0.30%	1	0.08%	2	0.15%	0	0.00%	2	0.15%	65	4.88%	62	4.65%
Lakes of the Four Seasons ‡	CDP	7,091	5,790	81.65%	127	1.79%	6	0.08%	53	0.75%	0	0.00%	25	0.35%	309	4.36%	781	11.01%
Shelby	CDP	453	419	92.49%	0	0.00%	2	0.44%	0	0.00%	0	0.00%	1	0.22%	15	3.31%	16	3.53%

=== 2020 census ===
In the 2020 census, the county had a population of 498,700. The median age was 39.5 years. 23.7% of residents were under the age of 18 and 16.9% of residents were 65 years of age or older. For every 100 females there were 93.5 males, and for every 100 females age 18 and over there were 90.3 males age 18 and over.

The racial makeup of the county was 55.2% White, 24.9% Black or African American, 0.6% American Indian and Alaska Native, 1.5% Asian, <0.1% Native Hawaiian and Pacific Islander, 7.8% from some other race, and 10.1% from two or more races. Hispanic or Latino residents of any race comprised 20.0% of the population.

95.5% of residents lived in urban areas, while 4.5% lived in rural areas.

There were 195,090 households in the county, of which 31.2% had children under the age of 18 living in them. Of all households, 42.0% were married-couple households, 19.6% were households with a male householder and no spouse or partner present, and 31.6% were households with a female householder and no spouse or partner present. About 29.3% of all households were made up of individuals and 12.2% had someone living alone who was 65 years of age or older.

There were 214,775 housing units, of which 9.2% were vacant. Among occupied housing units, 69.1% were owner-occupied and 30.9% were renter-occupied. The homeowner vacancy rate was 1.5% and the rental vacancy rate was 8.0%.

=== 2010 census ===
In the 2010 United States census, there were 496,005 people, 188,157 households, and 127,647 families residing in the county. The population density was 994.1 inhabitants per square mile (383.8/km^{2}). There were 208,750 housing units at an average density of 418.4 per square mile (161.5/km^{2}). The racial makeup of the county was 64.4% white, 25.9% black or African American, 1.2% Asian, 0.3% American Indian, 5.8% from other races, and 2.4% from two or more races. Those of Hispanic or Latino origin made up 16.7% of the population. In terms of ancestry, 16.1% were German, 11.1% were Irish, 9.6% were Polish, 5.4% were English, 4.8% were Italian and 3.7% were American.

Of the 188,157 households, 34.3% had children under the age of 18 living with them, 44.7% were married couples living together, 17.4% had a female householder with no husband present, 32.2% were non-families, and 27.4% of all households were made up of individuals. The average household size was 2.60 and the average family size was 3.19. The median age was 37.4 years.

The median income for a household in the county was $47,697 and the median income for a family was $58,931. Males had a median income of $50,137 versus $33,264 for females. The per capita income for the county was $23,142. About 12.2% of families and 16.1% of the population were below the poverty line, including 25.3% of those under age 18 and 8.4% of those age 65 or over.

Places by population and standard of living
Place	Population (2010)	Per capita income	Median household income	Median home value
Lake County	496,005	$23,792	$49,315	$137,400
Cedar Lake, town	11,560	$25,477	$59,090	$151,400
Crown Point, city	27,317	$31,454	$64,876	$174,900
Dyer, town	16,390	$35,020	$78,881	$197,500
East Chicago, city	29,698	$13,457	$27,171	$86,800
Gary, city	80,294	$15,764	$26,956	$66,900
Griffith, town	16,893	$26,548	$53,225	$141,600
Hammond, city	80,830	$18,148	$38,677	$94,800
Highland, town	23,727	$30,036	$61,930	$155,200
Hobart, city	29,059	$24,740	$54,468	$134,400
Lake Dalecarlia, CDP	1,355	$25,035	$52,321	$165,400
Lake Station, city	12,572	$16,953	$36,955	$82,400
Lakes of the Four Seasons, CDP (Note: Population is 3,936 within Lake County; 3,097 reside in Porter County)	7,033	$32,908	$84,242	$182,600
Lowell, town	9,276	$23,619	$60,549	$146,500
Merrillville, town	35,246	$23,605	$53,470	$132,600
Munster, town	23,603	$34,735	$70,708	$197,600
New Chicago, town	2,035	$18,083	$38,672	$97,700
St. John, town	14,850	$36,490	$97,868	$254,600
Schererville, town	29,243	$33,984	$68,004	$204,300
Schneider, town	277	$18,774	$50,972	$89,500
Shelby, CDP	539	$29,700	$61,667	$89,700
Whiting, city	4,997	$21,427	$44,368	$111,500
Winfield, town	4,383	$23,792	$49,315	$137,400

== See also ==
- Lake County Indiana Sheriff's Department
- List of public art in Lake County, Indiana
- National Register of Historic Places listings in Lake County, Indiana

== Bibliography ==
- Forstall, Richard L. (1995). U. S. Population of States and Counties - 1790 Through 1990. National Technical Information Services (NTIS). ISBN 0-934213-48-8.
- Schoon, Kenneth J. (2003). Calumet Beginnings: Ancient Shorelines and Settlements at the South End of Lake Michigan. Indiana University Press. ISBN 0-253-34218-X.
