= Shelby, Indiana =

- Census-designated place
- Looking north into Shelby from the State Road 55 bridge across the Kankakee River, March 2007

- Location in Lake County, Indiana

- Location within Indiana Location within the United States
- Coordinates: 41°11′36″N 87°20′34″W
- Country: United States
- State: Indiana
- County: Lake
- Township: Cedar Creek
- Platted: 1886
- Named for: William R. Shelby

Area
  - Total: 1.29 sq mi (3.33 km^{2})
  - Land: 1.29 sq mi (3.33 km^{2})
  - Water: 0 sq mi (0.00 km^{2})
- Elevation: 643 ft (196 m)

Population (2020)
  - Total: 453
  - Density: 351.9/sq mi (135.86/km^{2})
- Time zone: UTC-6 (CST)
  - Summer (DST): UTC-5 (CDT)
- ZIP code: 46377
- Area code: 219
- FIPS code: 18-69246
- GNIS feature ID: 2631625

Shelby is an unincorporated community and census-designated place in Cedar Creek Township, Lake County, Indiana. Shelby had a population of 453 at the 2020 census.

== History ==
Shelby was laid out and platted in 1886 by William R. Shelby, when the railroad was extended to that point.

== Geography ==
Shelby lies in the southeast corner of Cedar Creek Township, bordered to the south by the Kankakee River, which forms the Newton County line. Directly across the river is the unincorporated community of Thayer. Shelby is 9 miles (14 km) southeast of Lowell, 6 miles (10 km) east of Schneider and 10 miles (16 km) west of DeMotte.

Indiana State Road 55 crosses the Kankakee River at Shelby, making one of the few Kanakee River crossings from Lake County. Shelby, along other small Kankakee River communities, has historically had to contend with periodic flooding from the Kankakee River.

According to the U.S. Census Bureau, the Shelby CDP has an area of 1.3 square miles (3.3 km^{2}), all of it recorded as land.

== Demographics ==
Historical population
Census	Pop.	Note	%±
2010	539		—
2020	453		−16.0%
U.S. Decennial Census

Shelby first appeared as a census designated place in the 2010 U.S. census.

=== 2020 census ===
Shelby CDP, Indiana – Racial and ethnic composition Note: the US Census treats Hispanic/Latino as an ethnic category. This table excludes Latinos from the racial categories and assigns them to a separate category. Hispanics/Latinos may be of any race.
Race / Ethnicity (NH = Non-Hispanic)	Pop 2010	Pop 2020	% 2010	% 2020
White alone (NH)	515	419	95.55%	92.49%
Black or African American alone (NH)	9	0	1.67%	0.00%
Native American or Alaska Native alone (NH)	4	2	0.74%	0.44%
Asian alone (NH)	1	0	0.19%	0.00%
Native Hawaiian or Pacific Islander alone (NH)	0	0	0.00%	0.00%
Other race alone (NH)	1	1	0.19%	0.22%
Mixed race or Multiracial (NH)	4	15	0.74%	3.31%
Hispanic or Latino (any race)	5	16	0.93%	3.53%
Total	539	453	100.00%	100.00%

== Economy ==
Whiteco Industries, an Indiana business which, with its affiliates, is engaged in advertising (particularly billboard advertising) in Indiana, and in ownership of hotels, grew along with Dean White from a small advertising business in Shelby. The successor to the Shelby location of Whiteco's business (in this location making graphics for commercial vehicles), Modagraphics, closed its doors, however, in 1993, as a result of a consolidation within its new parent company from Illinois.

== Education ==
Students from Shelby attend schools operated by the Tri-Creek School Corporation in Lowell, Indiana.The school that was there was changed into a park.

The movie Now and Then is set in Shelby, Indiana, but the Shelby of the movie is fictional. The movie is actually based on the town of Winchester, Indiana.

== Notable people ==
- Jigger Sirois, IndyCar driver
