= Creston, Indiana =

- Unincorporated community
- Location within Indiana Location within the United States
- Coordinates: 41°20′16″N 87°25′53″W
- Country: United States
- State: Indiana
- County: Lake
- Township: West Creek
- Elevation: 709 ft (216 m)
- Time zone: UTC-6 (CST)
  - Summer (DST): UTC-5 (CDT)
- ZIP code: 46356 (Lowell)
- Area code: 219
- FIPS code: 18-15850
- GNIS feature ID: 433117

Creston is an unincorporated community that straddles the border between West Creek Township and Cedar Creek Township, Lake County, Indiana.

== History ==
Creston was originally called Cedar Lake, but the name was changed in 1882 when the Monon Railroad was extended to that point. The early settlers of Cedar Lake were almost all descendants of the Revolutionary War soldier Obadiah Taylor I who settled there.

The town was planned out mostly by Obadiah Taylor III and Brant McAllen. The business ventures in the nearby village of Tinkerville were moved west to Creston where they would be close to the new railroad, and in the 1880s Creston had multiple stores, blacksmith shop, coal and lumber yard, grain elevator, and post office.

In the 21st century, Creston is a quiet residential area, without substantial business or industry. A few descendants of the settlers remain. The earliest settlers were named Austin, Beck, Davis, Dille, Edgerton, Hill, King, Lloyd, McCarty, Miller, Palmer, Stillson, Skinner, Stopps, Scritchfield, Taylor, Thompson, Vinnedge, and Warriner.

== Geography ==
Creston is located one mile south of the town of Cedar Lake (which used to be called West Point), and three miles north of Lowell.
