= St. John, Indiana =

- Town
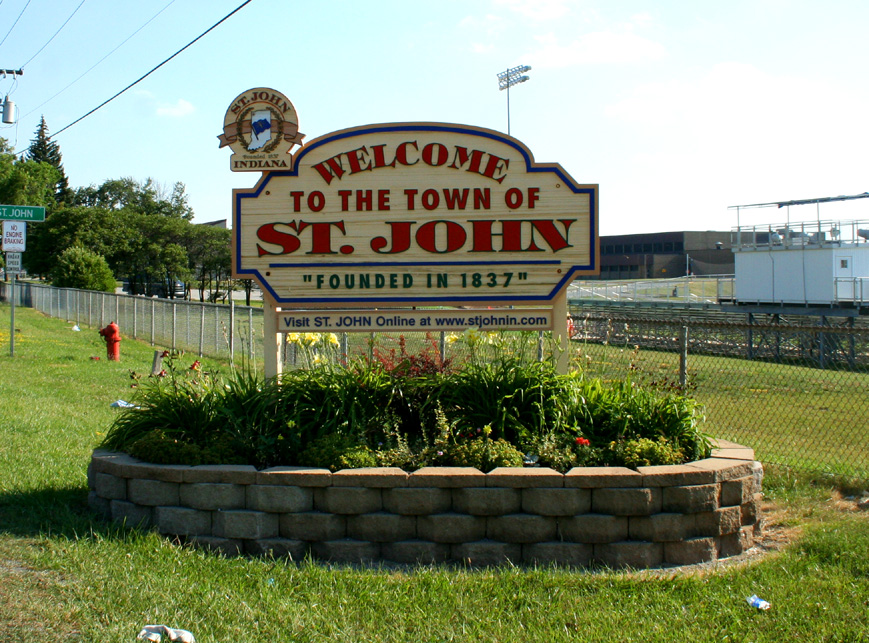

- Seal

- Location of St. John in Lake County, Indiana.
- Coordinates: 41°26′36″N 87°29′12″W
- Country: United States
- State: Indiana
- County: Lake
- Townships: Center, Hanover and St. John
- Founded: 1837

Government (update needed)
  - Type: Town
  - Body: Town Council
  - President: Gerald Swets (R, 3rd)
  - Vice-President: Mike Aurelio (R, 1st)
  - Members: Bryan Blazak (R, AL), Wayne Pondinas (R, AL), Michael Schilling (R, 2nd)
  - Clerk-Treasurer: Beth Hernandez (R)
  - Town Manager: Bill Manousopoulos

Area
  - Total: 12.75 sq mi (33.02 km^{2})
  - Land: 12.66 sq mi (32.80 km^{2})
  - Water: 0.085 sq mi (0.22 km^{2})
- Elevation: 699 ft (213 m)

Population (2020)
  - Total: 20,303
  - Estimate (2025): 24,841
  - Density: 1,603.4/sq mi (619.06/km^{2})

Standard of living (2008-12)
  - Per capita income: $36,490
  - Median home value: $254,600
- Time zone: UTC-6 (Central)
  - Summer (DST): UTC-5 (Central)
- ZIP code: 46373
- Area code: 219
- FIPS code: 18-66852
- GNIS feature ID: 2396898
- Website: stjohnin.gov

St. John or Saint John is a town in Lake County, Indiana, United States. St. John is located in St. John Township, Hanover Township, and Center Township. It is a southeastern suburb of Chicago. St. John was founded in 1837. The population was 20,303 at the 2020 census.

== History ==
The St. John post office was established in 1846. The community took its name from Saint Johns Church. The Church was the first church in Lake County and was founded by German immigrant John Hack.

St. John is home to the Shrine of Christ's Passion, opened in 2008. An interactive display of the Passion of Christ, it contains 40 life-size statues depicting the time from the Agony in the Garden all the way to the Resurrection. It has attracted visitors from all 50 US states and more than 40 countries.

The Francis P. Keilman House was listed in the National Register of Historic Places in 2013.

== Geography ==
According to the 2010 census, St. John has a total area of 11.481 square miles (29.74 km^{2}), of which 11.39 square miles (29.50 km^{2}) (or 99.21%) is land and 0.091 square miles (0.24 km^{2}) (or 0.79%) is water.

== Demographics ==
Historical population
Census	Pop.	Note	%±
1880	40		—
1920	279		—
1930	332		19.0%
1940	383		15.4%
1950	684		78.6%
1960	1,128		64.9%
1970	1,757		55.8%
1980	3,974		126.2%
1990	4,921		23.8%
2000	8,382		70.3%
2010	14,850		77.2%
2020	20,303		36.7%
2025 (est.)	24,841		22.4%
U.S. Decennial Census

=== Racial and ethnic composition ===
St. John town, Indiana – Racial and ethnic composition Note: the US Census treats Hispanic/Latino as an ethnic category. This table excludes Latinos from the racial categories and assigns them to a separate category. Hispanics/Latinos may be of any race.
Race / Ethnicity (NH = Non-Hispanic)	Pop 2000	Pop 2010	Pop 2020	% 2000	% 2010	% 2020
White alone (NH)	7,908	13,113	16,359	94.35%	88.30%	80.57%
Black or African American alone (NH)	11	183	634	0.13%	1.23%	3.12%
Native American or Alaska Native alone (NH)	14	16	34	0.17%	0.11%	0.17%
Asian alone (NH)	39	183	354	0.47%	1.23%	1.74%
Native Hawaiian or Pacific Islander alone (NH)	0	6	1	0.00%	0.04%	0.00%
Other race alone (NH)	1	8	72	0.01%	0.05%	0.35%
Mixed race or Multiracial (NH)	57	119	626	0.68%	0.80%	3.08%
Hispanic or Latino (any race)	352	1,222	2,223	4.20%	8.23%	10.95%
Total	8,382	14,850	20,303	100.00%	100.00%	100.00%

=== 2020 census ===
As of the 2020 census, St. John had a population of 20,303. The median age was 43.1 years. 24.2% of residents were under the age of 18 and 18.3% of residents were 65 years of age or older. For every 100 females, there were 95.1 males, and for every 100 females age 18 and over there were 92.8 males age 18 and over.

99.2% of residents lived in urban areas, while 0.8% lived in rural areas.

There were 7,187 households in St. John, of which 35.2% had children under the age of 18 living in them. Of all households, 71.2% were married-couple households, 8.7% were households with a male householder and no spouse or partner present, and 16.5% were households with a female householder and no spouse or partner present. About 16.8% of all households were made up of individuals, and 10.1% had someone living alone who was 65 years of age or older.

There were 7,394 housing units, of which 2.8% were vacant. The homeowner vacancy rate was 1.0% and the rental vacancy rate was 6.8%.

=== 2010 census ===
As of the census of 2010, there were 14,850 people, 5,047 households, and 4,225 families living in the town. The population density was 1,303.8 inhabitants per square mile (503.4/km^{2}). There were 5,201 housing units at an average density of 456.6 per square mile (176.3/km^{2}). The racial makeup of the town was 93.5% White, 1.3% African American, 0.1% Native American, 1.3% Asian, 0.1% Pacific Islander, 2.4% from other races, and 1.2% from two or more races. Hispanic or Latino of any race were 8.2% of the population.

There were 5,047 households, of which 40.2% had children under the age of 18 living with them, 75.5% were married couples living together, 5.6% had a female householder with no husband present, 2.6% had a male householder with no wife present, and 16.3% were non-families. 13.9% of all households were made up of individuals, and 6% had someone living alone who was 65 years of age or older. The average household size was 2.94 and the average family size was 3.25.

The median age in the town was 40.2 years. 27.3% of residents were under the age of 18; 6.3% were between the ages of 18 and 24; 23.6% were from 25 to 44; 31.2% were from 45 to 64; and 11.3% were 65 years of age or older. The gender makeup of the town was 49.9% male and 50.1% female.

=== 2000 census ===
As of the census of 2000, there were 8,382 people, 2,800 households, and 2,441 families living in the town. The population density was 1,246.6 inhabitants per square mile (481.3/km^{2}). There were 2,847 housing units at an average density of 423.4 per square mile (163.5/km^{2}). The racial makeup of the town was 91.55% White, 0.13% African American, 0.17% Native American, 0.47% Asian, 0.75% from other races, and 0.93% from two or more races. Hispanic or Latino of any race were 4.20% of the population.

There were 2,800 households, out of which 43.3% had children under the age of 18 living with them, 79.8% were married couples living together, 5.1% had a female householder with no husband present, and 12.8% were non-families. 11.1% of all households were made up of individuals, and 4.9% had someone living alone who was 65 years of age or older. The average household size was 2.99 and the average family size was 3.24.

In the town, the population was spread out, with 28.4% under the age of 18, 6.5% from 18 to 24, 28.3% from 25 to 44, 28.0% from 45 to 64, and 8.9% who were 65 years of age or older. The median age was 39 years. For every 100 females, there were 100.9 males. For every 100 females age 18 and over, there were 98.0 males.

The median income for a household in the town was $71,378, and the median income for a family was $75,231. Males had a median income of $55,554 versus $30,603 for females. The per capita income for the town was $25,106. About 1.1% of families and 1.7% of the population were below the poverty line, including 0.9% of those under age 18 and 2.9% of those age 65 or over.

== Education ==
St. John is served mostly by the Lake Central School Corporation (north of 101st Ave and west of Cline Ave), the Hanover Community School Corporation (south of 101st Ave and west of Cline Ave), and the Crown Point Community School Corporation (south of 101st Ave and east of Cline Ave). Three of the ten Lake Central schools are located in Saint John. These include:

- Lake Central High School
- Kolling Elementary School
- Clark Middle School

In addition to public schools, the community is home to a variety of private schools including St. John Evangelist School, a Roman Catholic School serving grades K-8 and Crown Point Christian School, a Christian school headed by a parent-owned association. Alongside Crown Point Christian School, Illiana Christian High School, originally located in Lansing, IL, is high school in the town which was founded by Dutch Reformed immigrants to serve the Dutch American community living in southern Cook County, IL, Will County, IL, and Lake County, IN. Many other residents attend for high school studies: Andrean High School (Merrillville), Bishop Noll Institute (Hammond), Marian Catholic High School (Chicago Heights, IL) and Mount Carmel High School (Chicago, IL).

== Transportation ==
=== Commuter Rail ===
St. John commuters to Chicago are served by Munster/Dyer station, a South Shore Line rail station in Munster, Indiana. It opened on March 31, 2026. The main station and parking lots are in Munster while overflow parking is in Dyer.

== Notable people ==
John Kass, a columnist and radio broadcaster who comments on Chicago and Illinois politics, lives in Saint John.
