= Palmer, Indiana =

- Unincorporated community
- Location within Indiana Location within the United States
- Coordinates: 41°23′29″N 87°14′20″W
- Country: United States
- State: Indiana
- County: Lake
- Township: Winfield
- Elevation: 728 ft (222 m)
- ZIP code: 46307 (Crown Point)
- Area code: 219
- FIPS code: 18-57690
- GNIS feature ID: 440845

Palmer is an unincorporated community in Winfield Township, Lake County, Indiana. A 2003 article in The Times described the town as "home to 57 residents, 19 homes". A sign on Randolph street near the entrance to the town describes the population as "Just The Way We Like It". Palmer lies along the site of a railroad line that has since been torn up. It is located approximately one-quarter mile south of the southwestern corner of the Lakes of the Four Seasons housing development, and is bordered on the west and south by the incorporated town of Winfield.

== History ==
In 1860, David Palmer, who had emigrated from Ohio in 1854 to what is now the town of Winfield, bought land in section 16 of Winfield Township, near the border with neighboring Porter County. He began to raise grain and livestock on the land. By 1882, the Chicago and Atlantic Railroad had been built through Lake County. On November 20 of that year, Palmer platted a town on his land, which was promptly adopted as a station by the railroad. By 1915, Palmer was an active station for the shipment of milk, livestock, and grain, and the town had grown large enough to accommodate a small schoolhouse, called the Palmer School. By mid-century, Palmer had a small business district which included a pool hall, two general stores, a telephone company, and a blacksmith shop.

The decline of Palmer coincides with the decline of the use of railroads in the area and the founding and growth of Lakes of the Four Seasons in the 1960s. Palmer Elementary School closed in 1966. The general store in Palmer closed in the early 1970s due to competition from the newer and larger stores built to service the growing Lakes of the Four Seasons community. Railroad service on the tracks through Palmer was discontinued in the late 1970s (by what was then the Erie Lackawanna Railway), and the tracks were torn up altogether in 1983.
