= Schneider, Indiana =

- Town
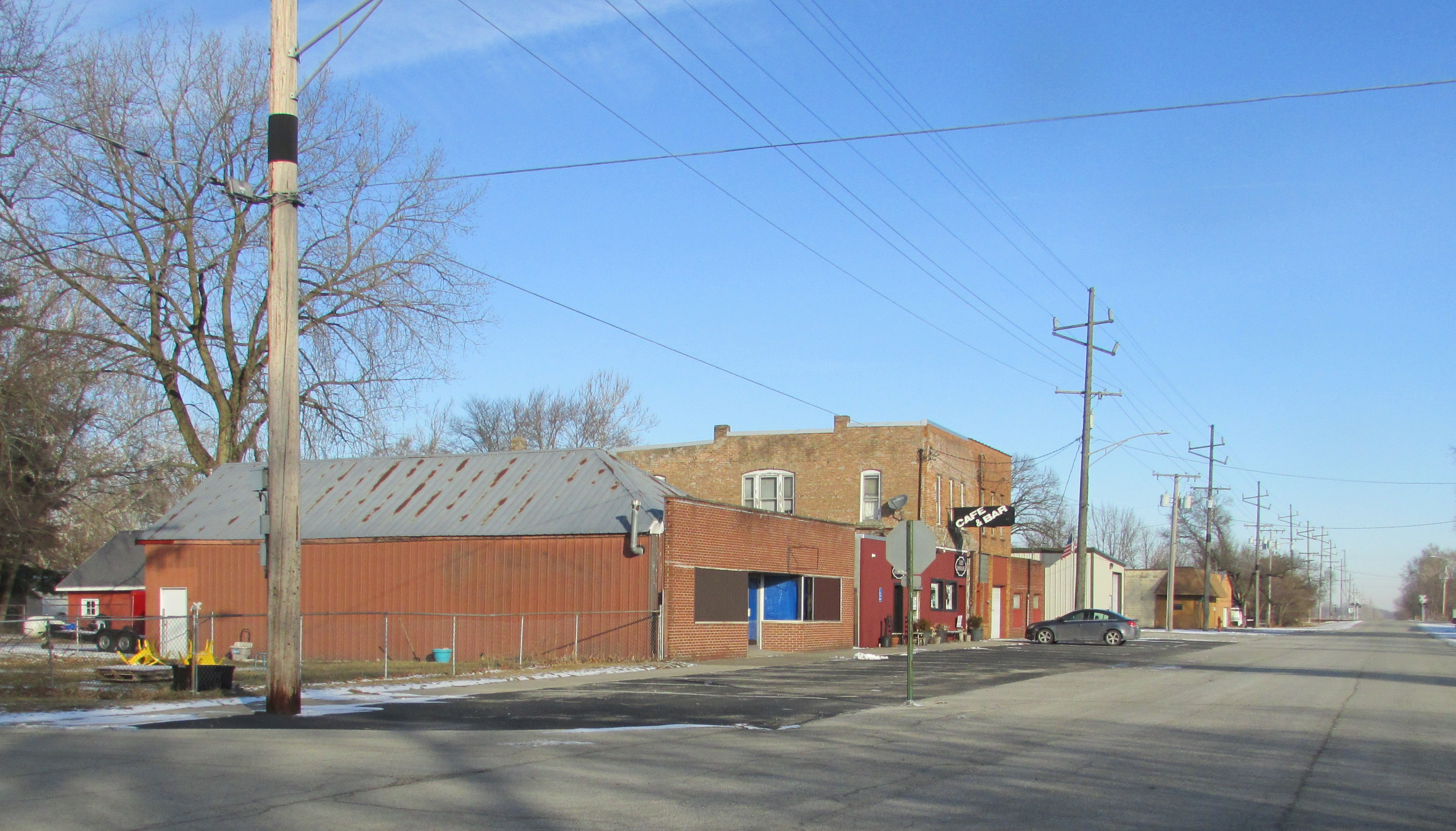
- Commercial district

- Location of Schneider in Lake County, Indiana.
- Coordinates: 41°11′32″N 87°26′43″W
- Country: United States
- State: Indiana
- County: Lake
- Township: West Creek

Government
  - Type: Town Board of Elected Officials

Area
  - Total: 0.84 sq mi (2.17 km^{2})
  - Land: 0.84 sq mi (2.17 km^{2})
  - Water: 0 sq mi (0.00 km^{2})
- Elevation: 630 ft (190 m)

Population (2020)
  - Total: 269
  - Density: 321.8/sq mi (124.23/km^{2})
- Time zone: UTC-6 (Central (CST))
  - Summer (DST): UTC-5 (CDT)
- ZIP code: 46376
- Area code: 219
- FIPS code: 18-68238
- GNIS feature ID: 2396908

Schneider (/ˈʃnaɪdər/ SHNY-dər) is a town in West Creek Township, Lake County, Indiana, United States. The population was 269 at the 2020 census. It is the smallest incorporated town in Lake County by population. It sits in the Kankakee River Valley.

== History ==
The Schneider post office opened in 1902.

== Geography ==
According to the 2010 census, Schneider has a total area of 0.86 square miles (2.23 km^{2}), all land.

== Demographics ==
Historical population
| Census | Pop. | Note | %± |
|---|---|---|---|
| 1920 | 258 | | — |
| 1930 | 264 | | 2.3% |
| 1940 | 283 | | 7.2% |
| 1950 | 356 | | 25.8% |
| 1960 | 405 | | 13.8% |
| 1970 | 426 | | 5.2% |
| 1980 | 364 | | −14.6% |
| 1990 | 310 | | −14.8% |
| 2000 | 317 | | 2.3% |
| 2010 | 277 | | −12.6% |
| 2020 | 269 | | −2.9% |
Source: US Census Bureau

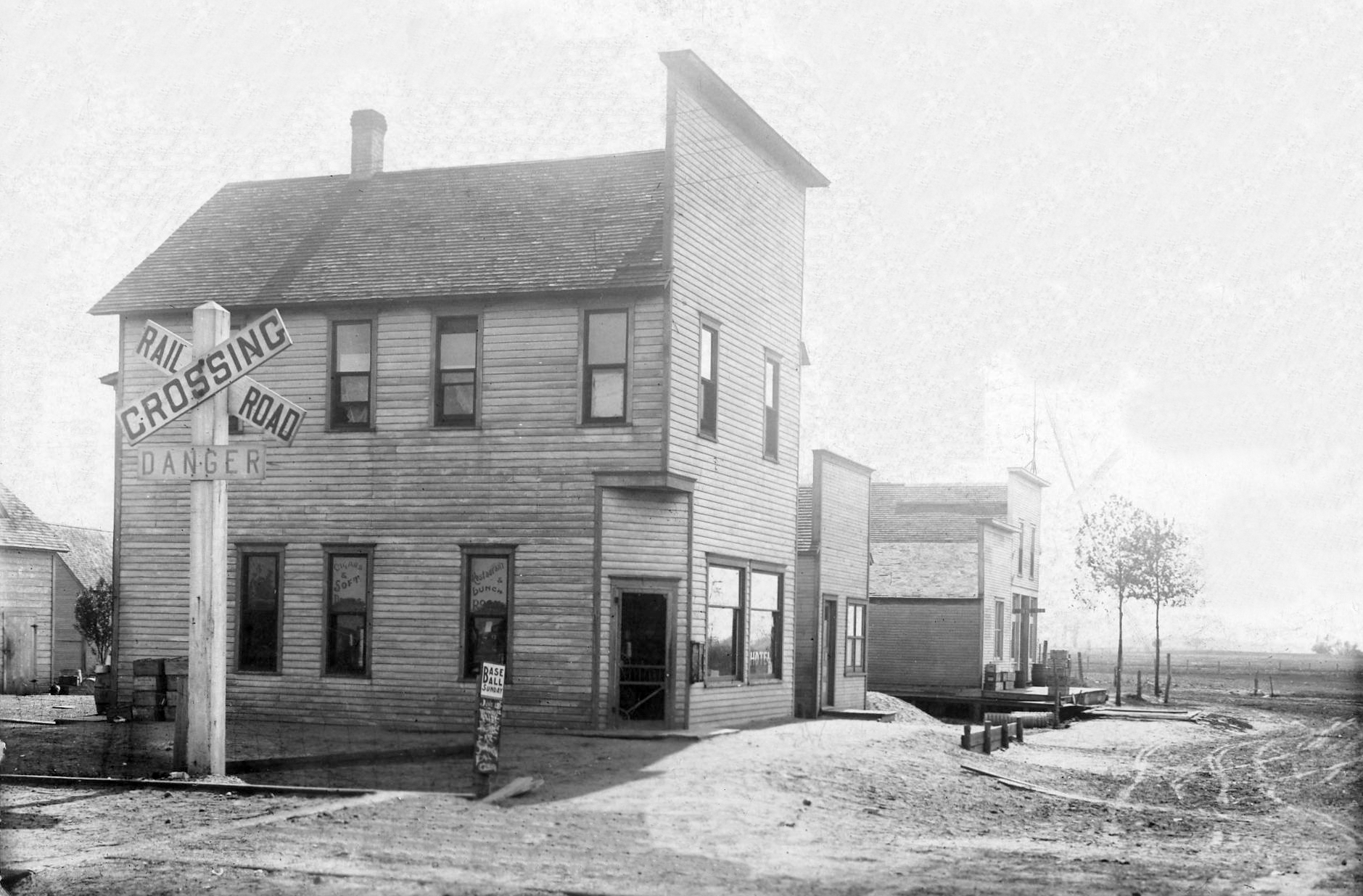
Restaurant and pool room in Schneider, 1910

=== 2020 census ===
Schneider town, Indiana – Racial and ethnic composition Note: the US Census treats Hispanic/Latino as an ethnic category. This table excludes Latinos from the racial categories and assigns them to a separate category. Hispanics/Latinos may be of any race.
| Race / Ethnicity (NH = Non-Hispanic) | Pop 2000 | Pop 2010 | Pop 2020 | % 2000 | % 2010 | % 2020 |
|---|---|---|---|---|---|---|
| White alone (NH) | 309 | 265 | 246 | 97.48% | 95.67% | 91.45% |
| Black or African American alone (NH) | 1 | 0 | 3 | 0.32% | 0.00% | 1.12% |
| Native American or Alaska Native alone (NH) | 1 | 0 | 0 | 0.32% | 0.00% | 0.00% |
| Asian alone (NH) | 0 | 3 | 0 | 0.00% | 1.08% | 0.00% |
| Native Hawaiian or Pacific Islander alone (NH) | 1 | 0 | 0 | 0.32% | 0.00% | 0.00% |
| Other race alone (NH) | 0 | 0 | 3 | 0.00% | 0.00% | 1.12% |
| Mixed race or Multiracial (NH) | 3 | 2 | 9 | 0.95% | 0.72% | 3.35% |
| Hispanic or Latino (any race) | 2 | 7 | 8 | 0.63% | 2.53% | 2.97% |
| Total | 317 | 277 | 269 | 100.00% | 100.00% | 100.00% |

=== 2010 census ===
As of the census of 2010, there were 277 people, 98 households, and 72 families living in the town. The population density was 322.1 inhabitants per square mile (124.4/km^{2}). There were 113 housing units at an average density of 131.4 per square mile (50.7/km^{2}). The racial makeup of the town was 97.1% White, 1.1% Native American, 1.1% Asian, and 0.7% from two or more races. Hispanic or Latino of any race were 2.5% of the population.

There were 98 households, of which 37.8% had children under the age of 18 living with them, 53.1% were married couples living together, 13.3% had a female householder with no husband present, 7.1% had a male householder with no wife present, and 26.5% were non-families. 24.5% of all households were made up of individuals, and 6.1% had someone living alone who was 65 years of age or older. The average household size was 2.83 and the average family size was 3.26.

The median age in the town was 33.5 years. 29.6% of residents were under the age of 18; 7.7% were between the ages of 18 and 24; 27.4% were from 25 to 44; 25.3% were from 45 to 64; and 10.1% were 65 years of age or older. The gender makeup of the town was 51.6% male and 48.4% female.

=== 2000 census ===
As of the census of 2000, there were 317 people, 113 households, and 84 families living in the town. The population density was 361.0 inhabitants per square mile (139.4/km^{2}). There were 125 housing units at an average density of 142.4 per square mile (55.0/km^{2}). The racial makeup of the town was 98.11% White, 0.32% African American, 0.32% Native American, 0.32% Pacific Islander, and 0.95% from two or more races. 0.63% of the population was Hispanic or Latino of any race.

There were 113 households, out of which 38.9% had children under the age of 18 living with them, 57.5% were married couples living together, 10.6% had a female householder with no husband present, and 24.8% were non-families. 20.4% of all households were made up of individuals, and 9.7% had someone living alone who was 65 years of age or older. The average household size was 2.79, and the average family size was 3.21.

In the town, the population was spread out, with 30.0% under the age of 18, 9.8% from 18 to 24, 28.4% from 25 to 44, 19.2% from 45 to 64, and 12.6% who were 65 years of age or older. The median age was 33 years. For every 100 females, there were 104.5 males. For every 100 females age 18 and over, there were 103.7 males.

The median income for a household in the town was $46,339, and the median income for a family was $46,932. Males had a median income of $41,250, versus $23,125 for females. The per capita income for the town was $16,463. 5.9% of the population and 4.3% of families were below the poverty line. Out of the total population, 4.9% of those under the age of 18 and 5.7% of those 65 and older were living below the poverty line.

== Education ==
Schneider is served by the Tri-Creek School Corporation which includes Lowell High School.
