= Southeast Grove, Indiana =

- Unincorporated community
- Location within Indiana Location within the United States
- Coordinates: 41°19′59″N 87°17′48″W
- Country: United States
- State: Indiana
- County: Lake
- Township: Eagle Creek
- Elevation: 725 ft (221 m)
- ZIP code: 46341 (Hebron)
- Area code: 219
- FIPS code: 18-71108
- GNIS feature ID: 443873

Southeast Grove is an unincorporated community in Eagle Creek Township, Lake County, Indiana.
