= Belshaw, Indiana =

- Unincorporated community
- Location within Indiana Location within the United States
- Coordinates: 41°15′23″N 87°27′12″W
- Country: United States
- State: Indiana
- County: Lake
- Township: West Creek
- Settled: 1836
- Named after: The Belshaw family
- Elevation: 676 ft (206 m)
- Time zone: UTC-6 (CST)
  - Summer (DST): UTC-5 (CDT)
- ZIP code: 46356 (Lowell)
- Area code: 219
- FIPS code: 18-04600
- GNIS feature ID: 430788

Belshaw is an unincorporated community in West Creek Township, Lake County, Indiana.

Belshaw was named for the Belshaw family of pioneer settlers, who settled the area in 1836.
