= Klaasville, Indiana =

- Unincorporated community
- Location within Indiana Location within the United States
- Coordinates: 41°21′21″N 87°31′03″W
- Country: United States
- State: Indiana
- County: Lake
- Township: Hanover
- Established: 1850
- Founded by: H. Klaas
- Elevation: 712 ft (217 m)
- ZIP code: 46303 (Cedar Lake)
- Area code: 219
- FIPS code: 18-40104
- GNIS feature ID: 437373

Klaasville is an unincorporated community in Hanover Township, Lake County, Indiana.

== History ==
Klaasville was founded in 1850. A post office was established at Klaasville in 1882, and remained in operation until it was discontinued in 1902. The community was named for the German American Klaas family of pioneer settlers. Klaasville was founded by settler H. Klaas.
