= Illiana Christian High School =

Location
- 10920 Calumet Avenue; Dyer, Indiana 46311; United States; 41°25′08″N 87°30′37″W

Information
- Type: Private secondary school
- Religious affiliation: Reformed Christian
- Founded: 1945
- Principal: Brent Vermeulen
- Teaching staff: 34.1 (on an FTE basis)
- Grades: 9–12
- Enrollment: 602 (2024-2025)
- Student to teacher ratio: 13.8
- Campus type: Suburban
- Colors: Hunter green, black and white
- Nickname: Vikings
- Accreditation: North Central Association
- Website: www.illianachristian.org

Illiana Christian High School is a private Christian school in Dyer, Indiana.

== History ==
Illiana Christian was founded in 1945 as a school for the children of Dutch Reformed immigrants in the area.

The original campus was located at 2261 Indiana Avenue in Lansing, Illinois.

In September 1987, a student shot and wounded a teacher at the school. The student, who had been removed from the soccer team for smoking cigarettes on campus, shot the teacher who turned him in.

In March 2014, Illiana decided to move to St. John, Indiana (approximately 12 miles to the southeast). The reasons given for the move include the need for larger and more modern facilities and grounds as well as the migration of many of the school's families to Northwest Indiana. On April 21, 2016, the Illiana Christian High School Association purchased a 37-acre site in Dyer, Indiana for $833,208.75. On November 5, 2016, groundbreaking for the new school property located on the corner of 109th Ave and Calumet Ave (also known as "Shoe Corner") in Hanover Township was held.

The new campus opened with the beginning of the 2018–19 school year.

== Academics ==
Illiana Christian has been accredited by the North Central Association since 1996.

== Demographics ==
The demographic breakdown of the 472 students enrolled for 2017-18 was:

- Asian - 2.5%
- Black - 18.6%
- Hispanic - 4.9%
- White - 74.0%

== Athletics ==
Illiana Christian's Vikings belong to the Greater South Shore athletic conference as of the 2024–25 school year. They will be joining the Northwest Crossroads conference in the 2026–27 school year. The school colors are hunter green, black and white. The following Indiana High School Athletic Association (IHSAA) sanctioned sports are offered:

- Baseball (boys)
- Basketball (girls and boys)
- Cross country (girls and boys)
- Golf (boys and girls)
- Soccer (girls and boys)
- Softball (girls)
- Tennis (girls and boys)
- Track and field (girls and boys)
- Volleyball (girls and boys)
- Wrestling (boys and girls)
- Flag football (girls)

Illiana started a boys' football program in 2025, a first in the school's 80-year history, beginning with a JV program and then growing into a varsity-level program.

Illiana's boys cross country team took second overall at the Illinois High School Association (IHSA) 2A state meet in 2013.

Illiana's baseball team won the Class 2A championship in 2022, and once again in 2023.
