= Orchard Grove, Indiana =

- Unincorporated community
- Location within Indiana Location within the United States
- Coordinates: 41°17′23″N 87°21′13″W
- Country: United States
- State: Indiana
- County: Lake
- Township: Cedar Creek
- Elevation: 682 ft (208 m)
- ZIP code: 46356 (Lowell)
- Area code: 219
- FIPS code: 18-56835
- GNIS feature ID: 440682

Orchard Grove is an unincorporated community in Cedar Creek Township, Lake County, Indiana.

A post office was established at Orchard Grove in 1854, and remained in operation until it was discontinued in 1904.
