= Deer Creek, Lake County, Indiana =

Deer Creek, Indiana
- Unincorporated community and Census-designated place
- Location within Indiana Location within the United States
- Coordinates: 41°25′14″N 87°15′29″W
- Country: United States
- State: Indiana
- County: Lake
- Township: Winfield
- Elevation: 689 ft (210 m)

Population (2020)
  - Total: 115
- Time zone: UTC-6 (CST)
  - Summer (DST): UTC-5 (CDT)
- ZIP code: 46307 (Crown Point)
- Area code: 219
- FIPS code: 18-17265
- GNIS feature ID: 433418

Deer Creek is an unincorporated community and census-designated place in Winfield Township, Lake County, Indiana, United States. As of 2020, its population is 115.
