= Leroy, Indiana =

- Unincorporated community and Census-designated place
- Location within Indiana Location within the United States
- Coordinates: 41°21′36″N 87°16′19″W
- Country: United States
- State: Indiana
- County: Lake
- Township: Winfield
- Elevation: 682 ft (208 m)
- ZIP code: 46307 (Crown Point), 46355
- Area code: 219
- FIPS code: 18-42930
- GNIS feature ID: 2830829

Leroy is an unincorporated community in Winfield Township, Lake County, Indiana. The town was founded on December 11, 1875, by Thomas McClarn. The town sign at the intersection of U.S. 231 and Elkhart Street describes Leroy as "One of Lake County's First Irish Settlements".

Leroy has a United States Postal Service office.

== Demographics ==
Historical population
Census	Pop.	Note	%±
2023 (est.)	278

The United States Census Bureau defined Leroy as a census designated place in the 2023 American Community Survey.
