= Kreitzburg, Indiana =

- Unincorporated community
- Location within Indiana Location within the United States
- Coordinates: 41°26′09″N 87°31′16″W
- Country: United States
- State: Indiana
- County: Lake
- Township: St. John
- Elevation: 702 ft (214 m)
- ZIP code: 46311 (Dyer)
- Area code: 219
- FIPS code: 18-40554
- GNIS feature ID: 437453

Kreitzburg was an unincorporated community in St. John Township, Lake County, Indiana. The name has also been spelled Kreuzburg and Kreitsburg.

== Geography ==
Kreitzburg was located between Dyer, Indiana, and Brunswick, Indiana.

== History ==
According to a 1996 book on Indiana border towns, Kreitzburg was founded in 1880, but "has never been much of a town." It once had a blacksmith shop, tavern, and general store, all of which were gone, leaving just a few houses. Yet, the author noted that an open field had a sign promising a future shopping center, suggesting that development of the area was coming. A 1908 newspaper article joked that "Yes, Kreitzburg is on the map" when mentioning a local motorist having more fun "than all the autoists between here and Kreitzburg."

Under the name Kreuzburg, the community had a population of 75 in 1890.

A 1917 Chicago Examiner article discusses "the little village of Kreitzburg" on what was then known as the Lincoln Highway, 3 miles (4.8 km) outside of Dyer, on the route to nearby Brunswick, Indiana.

Today, the location is within the zipcode for Dyer, Indiana, and largely suburban though not within the Dyer city limits.

== See also ==
- New Elliott, Indiana
