= Range Line, Indiana =

- Unincorporated community
- Location within Indiana Location within the United States
- Coordinates: 41°16′10″N 87°16′34″W
- Country: United States
- State: Indiana
- County: Lake
- Township: Eagle Creek
- Elevation: 650 ft (200 m)
- ZIP code: 46341 (Hebron)
- Area code: 219
- FIPS code: 18-62991
- GNIS feature ID: 441765

Range Line is an unincorporated community in Eagle Creek Township, Lake County, Indiana.

== Geography ==
Range Line is located on the seventh range line west of the Second principal meridian.
