= Eagle Creek Township, Lake County, Indiana =

Eagle Creek Township
- Township
- Coordinates: 41°16′56″N 87°16′56″W
- Country: United States
- State: Indiana
- County: Lake
- founded: 1839

Government
  - Type: Indiana township

Area
  - Total: 56.01 sq mi (145.1 km^{2})
  - Land: 55.84 sq mi (144.6 km^{2})
  - Water: 0.16 sq mi (0.41 km^{2})
- Elevation: 653 ft (199 m)

Population (2020)
  - Total: 1,719
  - Density: 29.9/sq mi (11.5/km^{2})
- FIPS code: 18-19306
- GNIS feature ID: 453270

Eagle Creek Township is one of eleven townships in Lake County, Indiana, United States. As of the 2010 census, its population was 1,668 and it contained 709 housing units.

Historical population
| Census | Pop. | Note | %± |
|---|---|---|---|
| 1890 | 647 | | — |
| 1900 | 597 | | −7.7% |
| 1910 | 717 | | 20.1% |
| 1920 | 709 | | −1.1% |
| 1930 | 717 | | 1.1% |
| 1940 | 756 | | 5.4% |
| 1950 | 771 | | 2.0% |
| 1960 | 771 | | 0.0% |
| 1970 | 786 | | 1.9% |
| 1980 | 1,421 | | 80.8% |
| 1990 | 1,431 | | 0.7% |
| 2000 | 1,695 | | 18.4% |
| 2010 | 1,668 | | −1.6% |
| 2020 | 1,719 | | 3.1% |
Source: US Decennial Census

== History ==
Eagle Creek Township was established in 1839.

The Kingsbury-Doak Farmhouse was listed in the National Register of Historic Places in 2005.

== Geography ==
According to the 2010 census, the township has a total area of 56.01 square miles (145.1 km^{2}), of which 55.84 square miles (144.6 km^{2}) (or 99.70%) is land and 0.16 square miles (0.41 km^{2}) (or 0.29%) is water.

== Education ==
Eagle Creek Township, along with Cedar Creek Township and West Creek Township, is served by the Tri-Creek School Corporation which includes Lowell High School.
