= Cedar Creek Township, Lake County, Indiana =

Cedar Creek Township
- Township
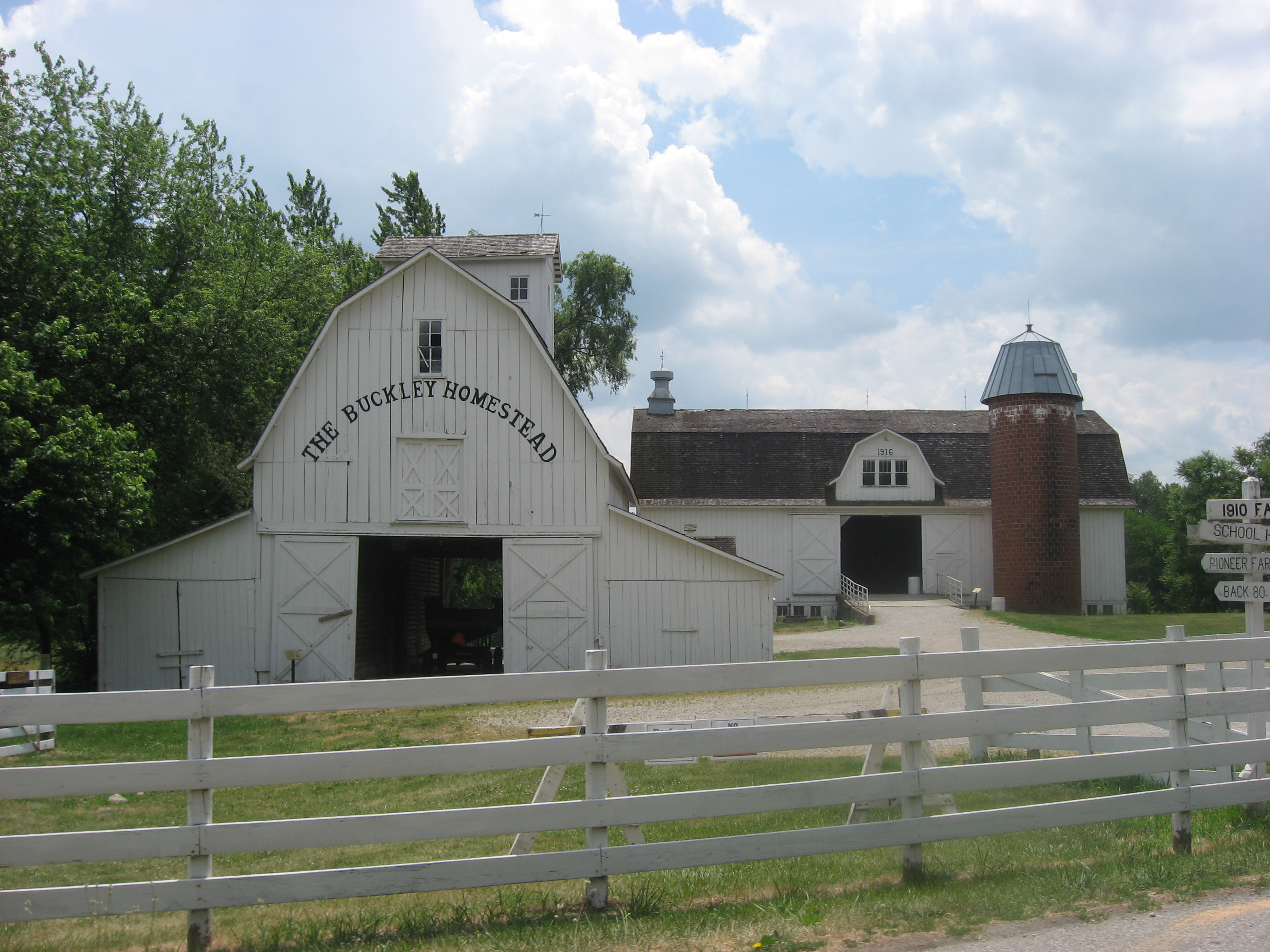
- Barns at the Buckley Homestead, a historic site in the township

- Coordinates: 41°15′17″N 87°22′43″W
- Country: United States
- State: Indiana
- County: Lake
- Founded: 1839

Government
  - Type: Indiana township

Area
  - Total: 60.57 sq mi (156.9 km^{2})
  - Land: 60.01 sq mi (155.4 km^{2})
  - Water: 0.56 sq mi (1.5 km^{2})
- Elevation: 636 ft (194 m)

Population (2020)
  - Total: 12,725
  - Density: 201.6/sq mi (77.8/km^{2})
- Time zone: UTC-6 (CST)
  - Summer (DST): UTC-5 (CDT)
- ZIP codes: 46307, 46356, 46377
- Area code: 219
- FIPS code: 18-11026
- GNIS feature ID: 453171

Cedar Creek Township is one of eleven townships in Lake County, Indiana. As of the 2020 census, its population was 12,725, containing 4,710 housing units, up from 12,097 as of 2010.

Historical population
Census	Pop.	Note	%±
1890	1,691		—
1900	2,407		42.3%
1910	2,312		−3.9%
1920	2,381		3.0%
1930	2,619		10.0%
1940	3,010		14.9%
1950	3,536		17.5%
1960	5,010		41.7%
1970	6,365		27.0%
1980	8,704		36.7%
1990	9,009		3.5%
2000	10,649		18.2%
2010	12,097		13.6%
2020	12,725		5.2%
Source: US Decennial Census

== History ==
Cedar Creek Township was established in 1839.

The Buckley Homestead was listed in the National Register of Historic Places in 1984.

== Geography ==
According to the 2010 census, the township has a total area of 60.57 square miles (156.9 km^{2}), of which 60.01 square miles (155.4 km^{2}) (or 99.08%) is land and 0.56 square miles (1.5 km^{2}) (or 0.92%) is water. The township includes most of the town of Lowell, as well the census-designated places Lake Dalecarlia and Shelby.

== Education ==
Cedar Creek Township, along with West Creek Township and Eagle Creek Township, is served by the Tri-Creek School Corporation which includes Lowell High School.
