= Kingsbury-Doak Farmhouse =

Historic house in Indiana, United States

- U.S. National Register of Historic Places
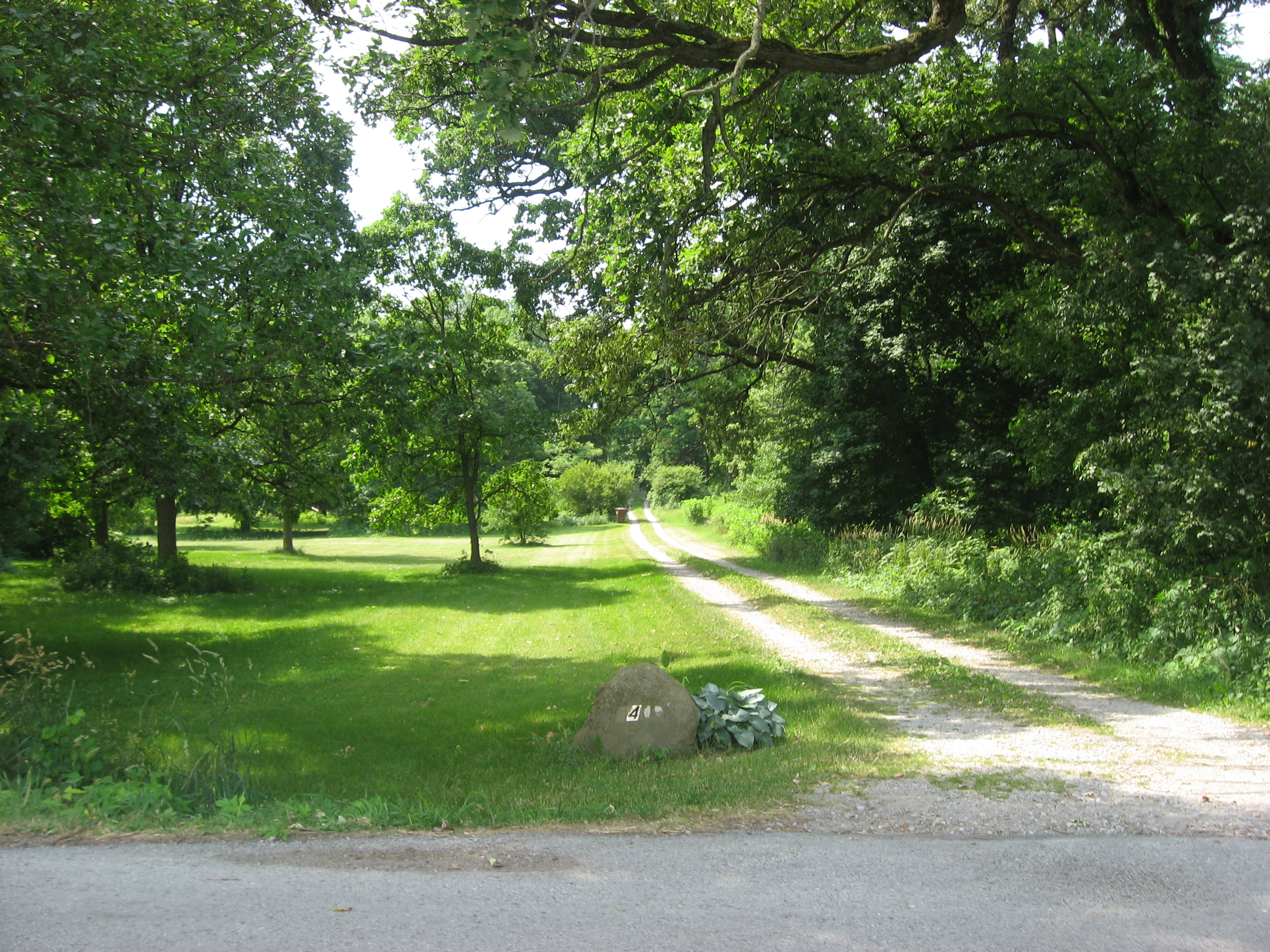
- Kingsbury-Doak Farm driveway, June 2012

- Location within Indiana Location within the United States
- Location: 4411 E. 153rd Ave., west of Hebron, Indiana
- Coordinates: 41°20′20″N 87°17′10″W
- Area: less than one acre
- Built: c. 1865, c. 1885
- Architectural style: Italianate
- NRHP reference No.: 05001013
- Added to NRHP: September 15, 2005

Kingsbury-Doak Farmhouse, also known as the Steele Farmhouse, is a historic home located in Eagle Creek Township, Lake County, Indiana. The house was built in two sections. The older section was built in the 1860s, and is a simple 1 1/2-story, frame structure that now forms the rear wing. The two-story, Italianate style frame section was added in the 1880s. It has a cross-gable roof with overhanging eaves and sits on a fieldstone foundation. It features windows with unique decorative pedimented hoods.

It was listed in the National Register of Historic Places in 2005.
