= Buckley Homestead =

- U.S. National Register of Historic Places
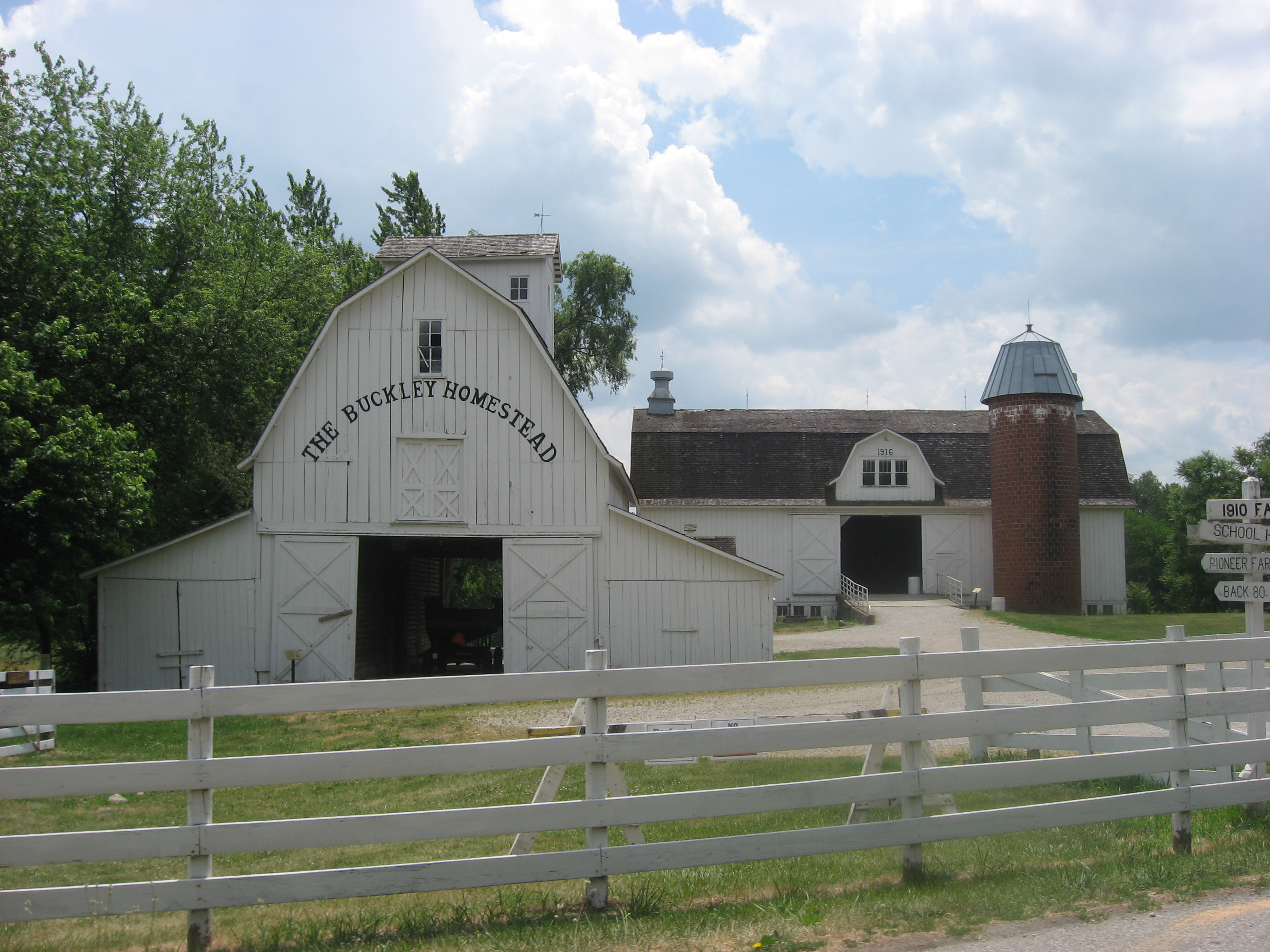
- Barns at the homestead

- Location within Indiana Location within the United States
- Location: 3606 Belshaw Rd., southeast of Lowell, Cedar Creek Township, Lake County, Indiana, USA
- Coordinates: 41°16′53″N 87°22′43″W
- Area: 2.9 acres (1.2 ha)
- Built: 1853
- Architect: Albert Smith
- Architectural style: Greek Revival
- NRHP reference No.: 84000503
- Added to NRHP: December 6, 1984

Buckley Homestead Living History Farm is a county park and historical museum located at Lowell, Indiana. The park is open from 7 a.m. to sunset year round. It is listed on the National Register of Historic Places. The park is operated by Lake County Parks.

== History ==
The Buckleys were Irish immigrants who moved to the United States in the mid-18th century. They first moved to Northwest Indiana in 1849, where they built their first farmstead. The Buckleys ended up turning their farm into a 150-head dairy farm. They sold their milk to markets in Chicago during the early 20th century. Over four generations, the farm grew from 79 acres (32 ha) to 520 acres (210 ha). In 1977, part of the park was donated by Rose Buckley Pearce to be part of the Lake County Parks. The Buckley Homestead was added to the National Register of Historic Places in 1984.

== Features ==
Next to the parking area, there is a visitor center which contains restroom facilities, drinking fountains, information kiosk, and a gift shop which is open on Sunday afternoons from May through the first of August. After that, a path will lead to the Buckley's farm. The park is divided into sections: Main House Museum, School, Pioneer Farm, and Back Again.

== Events and activities ==
Buckley Homestead holds many events throughout the season. A list of events at Buckley Homestead are listed below.

=== WWII Tribute ===
Buckley Homestead used to hold a World War II Tribute every year by reenacting battles between the axis and allies. The tributes held skirmishes, axis and allies encampments, uniform demonstration, World War II Veterans Panel, and homefront displays.

=== Legend of Sleepy Hollow ===
This event is held annually. Buckley Homestead is transformed into Tarrytown, New York, popularly known as Sleepy Hollow. There, visitors walk with a guide through the homestead while encountering townsfolk in search of Ichabod Crane, the one person who can tell the stories of the village.
