= Brunswick, Indiana =

- Unincorporated community
- Location within Indiana Location within the United States
- Coordinates: 41°22′35″N 87°30′29″W
- Country: United States
- State: Indiana
- County: Lake
- Township: Hanover
- Elevation: 725 ft (221 m)
- Time zone: UTC-6 (CST)
  - Summer (DST): UTC-5 (CDT)
- ZIP code: 46303 (Cedar Lake)
- Area code: 219
- FIPS code: 18-08668
- GNIS feature ID: 431672

Brunswick is an unincorporated community in Hanover Township, Lake County, Indiana.

== History ==
Brunswick was founded in the 1850s. The community was named after Brunswick, Germany.
