= West Creek Township, Lake County, Indiana =

West Creek Township
- Township
- Coordinates: 41°15′28″N 87°28′56″W
- Country: United States
- State: Indiana
- County: Lake
- founded: 1839

Government
  - Type: Indiana township

Area
  - Total: 62.07 sq mi (160.8 km^{2})
  - Land: 61.96 sq mi (160.5 km^{2})
  - Water: 0.12 sq mi (0.31 km^{2})
- Elevation: 682 ft (208 m)

Population (2020)
  - Total: 7,676
  - Density: 123.9/sq mi (47.8/km^{2})
- FIPS code: 18-82574
- GNIS feature ID: 454048

West Creek Township is one of eleven townships in Lake County, Indiana. As of the 2020 census, its population was 7,676 and it contained 3,046 housing units.

Historical population
Census	Pop.	Note	%±
1890	1,201		—
1900	1,173		−2.3%
1910	1,306		11.3%
1920	1,481		13.4%
1930	1,412		−4.7%
1940	1,566		10.9%
1950	1,904		21.6%
1960	2,411		26.6%
1970	3,391		40.6%
1980	4,316		27.3%
1990	4,223		−2.2%
2000	4,981		17.9%
2010	6,826		37.0%
2020	7,676		12.5%
Source: US Decennial Census

== History ==
West Creek Township was founded in 1839. It took its name from the westernmost of three large streams in the vicinity.

== Geography ==
According to the 2020 census, the township has a total area of 62.07 square miles (160.8 km^{2}), of which 61.96 square miles (160.5 km^{2}) (or 99.81%) is land and 0.12 square miles (0.3 km^{2}) (or 0.19%) is water. The township includes a small portion of the incorporated town of Lowell, as well as the town of Schneider.

== Education ==
West Creek Township, along with Cedar Creek Township and Eagle Creek Township, is served by the Tri-Creek School Corporation which includes Lowell High School.
