= Francis P. Keilman House =

Historic house in Indiana, United States

- U.S. National Register of Historic Places
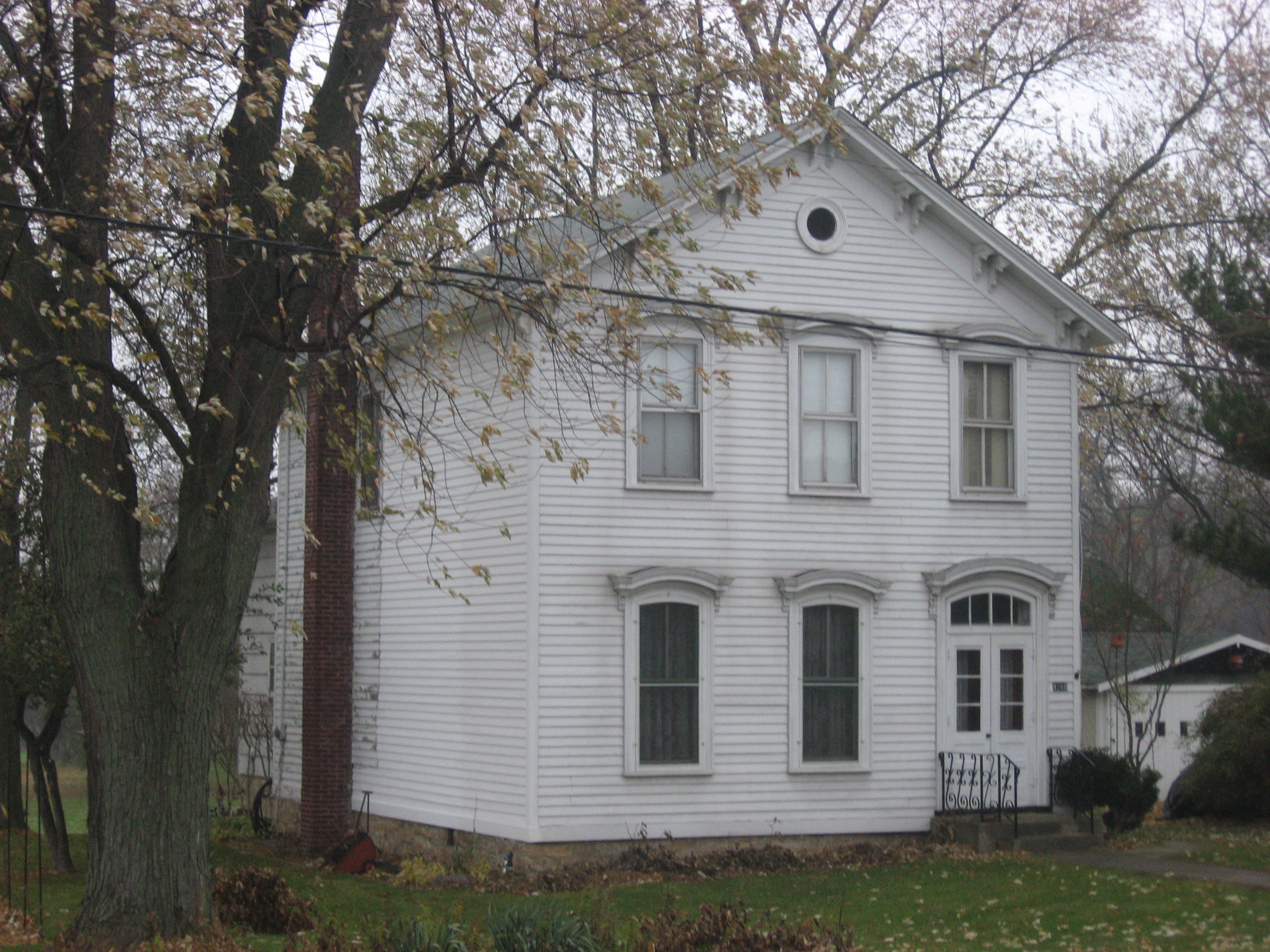
- Francis P. Keilman House, November 2013

- Location within Indiana Location within the United States
- Location: 9260 Patterson St., St. John, Indiana
- Coordinates: 41°27′03″N 87°28′17″W
- Area: 1.146 acres (0.464 ha)
- Built: c. 1857, c. 1890, c. 1900, c. 1940
- Architectural style: Italianate
- NRHP reference No.: 13000084
- Added to NRHP: March 20, 2013

Francis P. Keilman House is a historic home located at St. John, Indiana. It was built about 1857, and is a two-story, side hall plan balloon frame dwelling with Italianate style design elements. It has a front gable roof and a rear addition built about 1900. Also on the property are the contributing wood frame stable (c. 1890) with a garage addition (c. 1940) and a wood frame rabbit hutch (c. 1940).

It was listed in the National Register of Historic Places in 2013.
