= Lake Dalecarlia, Indiana =

- Census-designated place
- Location in Lake County, Indiana
- Coordinates: 41°20′13″N 87°24′13″W
- Country: United States
- State: Indiana
- County: Lake
- Township: Cedar Creek

Area
  - Total: 1.40 sq mi (3.63 km^{2})
  - Land: 1.13 sq mi (2.92 km^{2})
  - Water: 0.27 sq mi (0.71 km^{2})
- Elevation: 702 ft (214 m)

Population (2020)
  - Total: 1,332
  - Density: 1,181/sq mi (455.9/km^{2})
- Time zone: UTC-6 (Central (CST))
  - Summer (DST): UTC-5 (CDT)
- ZIP codes: 46307, 46356
- Area code: 219
- FIPS code: 18-41058
- GNIS feature ID: 2393077
- Website: lakedalecarlia.org

Lake Dalecarlia is a census-designated place (CDP) in Lake County, Indiana, United States. The population was 1,332 at the 2020 census. The name comes from the English name of the Dalarna region of Sweden. The community is centered on the lake of the same name, which was completed in the 1920s.

== Geography ==
The Lake Dalecarlia community is located in southern Lake County surrounding a lake of the same name. The community is at the northern end of Cedar Creek Township and is bordered to the north by the town of Cedar Lake.

According to the United States Census Bureau, the CDP has a total area of 1.4 square miles (3.6 km^{2}), of which 1.1 square miles (2.9 km^{2}) are land and 0.3 square miles (0.7 km^{2}), or 19.27%, are water. The community's namesake lake is a reservoir on Cedar Creek, a south-flowing tributary of the Kankakee River and thus part of the Illinois River watershed.

== Demographics ==
Historical population
Census	Pop.	Note	%±
1990	1,276		—
2000	1,285		0.7%
2010	1,355		5.4%
2020	1,332		−1.7%
Source: US Census Bureau

=== Racial and ethnic composition ===
Lake Dalecarlia CDP, Indiana – Racial and ethnic composition Note: the US Census treats Hispanic/Latino as an ethnic category. This table excludes Latinos from the racial categories and assigns them to a separate category. Hispanics/Latinos may be of any race.
Race / Ethnicity (NH = Non-Hispanic)	Pop 2000	Pop 2010	Pop 2020	% 2000	% 2010	% 2020
White alone (NH)	1,236	1,293	1,196	96.19%	95.42%	89.79%
Black or African American alone (NH)	5	3	4	0.39%	0.22%	0.30%
Native American or Alaska Native alone (NH)	3	2	1	0.23%	0.15%	0.08%
Asian alone (NH)	1	1	2	0.08%	0.07%	0.15%
Native Hawaiian or Pacific Islander alone (NH)	0	0	0	0.00%	0.00%	0.00%
Other race alone (NH)	1	0	2	0.08%	0.00%	0.15%
Mixed race or Multiracial (NH)	9	10	65	0.70%	0.74%	4.88%
Hispanic or Latino (any race)	30	46	62	2.33%	3.39%	4.65%
Total	1,285	1,355	1,332	100.00%	100.00%	100.00%

=== 2020 census ===
As of the 2020 census, Lake Dalecarlia had a population of 1,332. The median age was 46.8 years. 18.7% of residents were under the age of 18 and 22.9% of residents were 65 years of age or older. For every 100 females there were 114.8 males, and for every 100 females age 18 and over there were 104.3 males age 18 and over.

0.0% of residents lived in urban areas, while 100.0% lived in rural areas.

There were 558 households in Lake Dalecarlia, of which 20.3% had children under the age of 18 living in them. Of all households, 57.3% were married-couple households, 20.3% were households with a male householder and no spouse or partner present, and 15.8% were households with a female householder and no spouse or partner present. About 27.8% of all households were made up of individuals and 15.3% had someone living alone who was 65 years of age or older.

There were 635 housing units, of which 12.1% were vacant. The homeowner vacancy rate was 1.1% and the rental vacancy rate was 4.7%.

=== 2000 census ===
At the 2000 census, there were 1,285 people, 506 households and 363 families residing in the CDP. The population density was 904.7 per square mile (349.3/km^{2}). There were 571 housing units at an average density of 402.0 per square mile (155.2/km^{2}). The racial make-up of the CDP was 98.21% White, 0.39% African American, 0.39% Native American, 0.08% Asian, 0.16% from other races and 0.78% from two or more races. Hispanic or Latino of any race were 2.33% of the population.

There were 506 households, of which 28.9% had children under the age of 18 living with them, 62.6% were married couples living together, 5.9% had a female householder with no husband present and 28.1% were non-families. 23.3% of all households were made up of individuals, and 8.7% had someone living alone who was 65 years of age or older. The average household size was 2.54 and the average family size was 3.02.

22.8% of the population were under the age of 18, 7.9% from 18 to 24, 27.8% from 25 to 44, 28.5% from 45 to 64 and 13.0% were 65 years of age or older. The median age was 39 years. For every 100 females, there were 100.2 males. For every 100 females age 18 and over, there were 96.8 males.

The median household income was $52,454 and the median family income was $54,297. Males had a median income of $44,659 and females $21,250. The per capita income was $25,068. About 1.9% of families and 4.1% of the population were below the poverty line, including 5.0% of those under age 18 and 6.1% of those age 65 or over.
