= Whihala Beach County Park =

Public beach in Whiting, Indiana, United States

Coordinates: 41.688141°N 87.498343°W

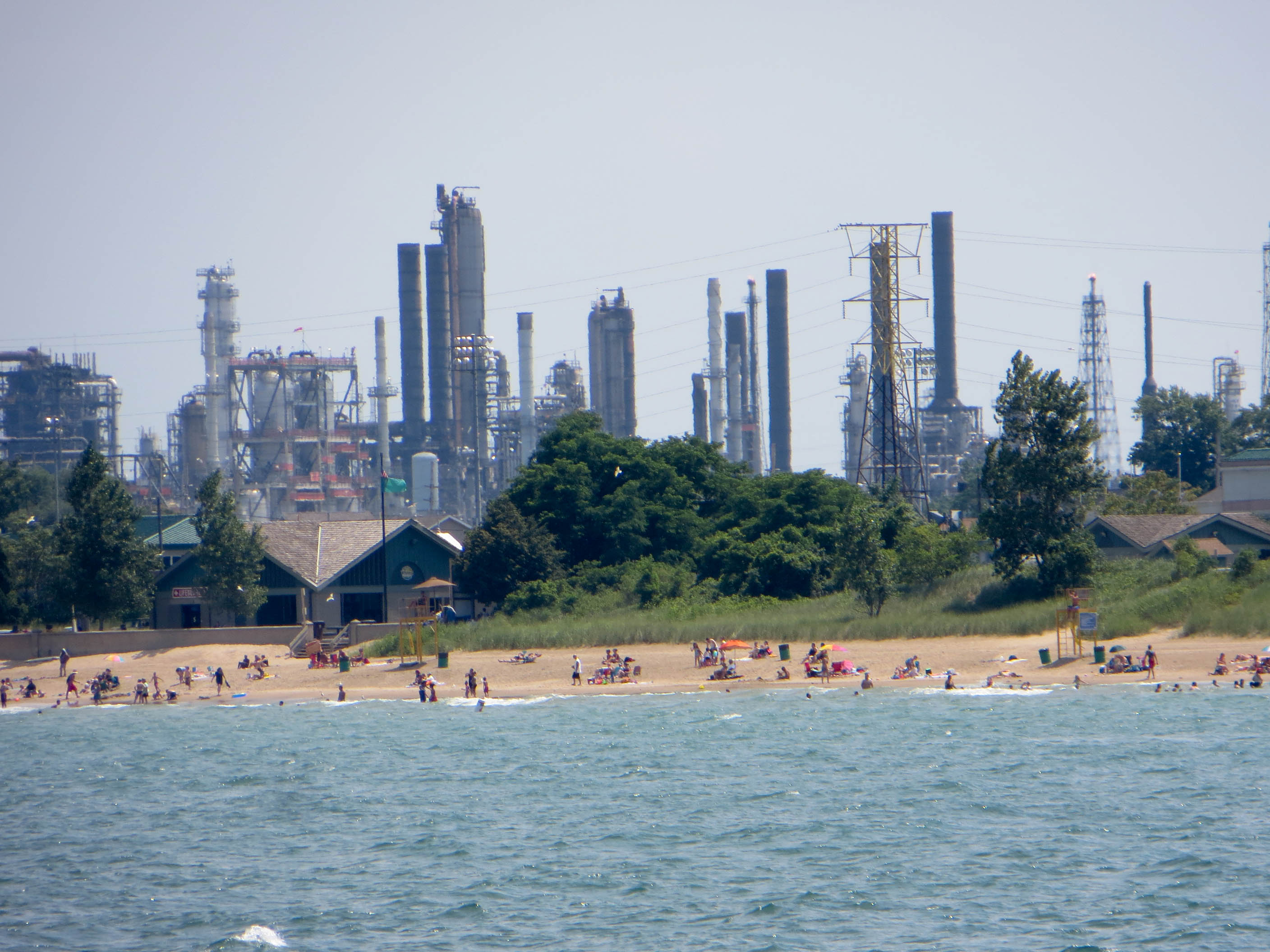
Whihala Beach is located on Lake Michigan.

Whihala Beach County Park is a park in Whiting, Indiana, United States. It is a public beach with life guards. The beach was previously named Whiting Beach.

Whihala Beach is named after the nearby cities of Whiting and Hammond and Lake County Parks Department.
