= Center Township, Lake County, Indiana =

Center Township
- Township
- Coordinates: 41°23′37″N 87°22′01″W
- Country: United States
- State: Indiana
- County: Lake

Government
  - Type: Indiana township
  - Trustee: Paul Bremer

Area
  - Total: 39.94 sq mi (103.4 km^{2})
  - Land: 39.35 sq mi (101.9 km^{2})
  - Water: 0.59 sq mi (1.5 km^{2})
- Elevation: 758 ft (231 m)

Population (2020)
  - Total: 38,630
  - Density: 806.9/sq mi (311.5/km^{2})
- FIPS code: 18-11476
- GNIS feature ID: 453184

Center Township is one of eleven townships in Lake County, Indiana, United States. As of the 2020 census, its population was 38,630, containing 15,192 housing units, up from 31,756 in 2010.

Historical population
Census	Pop.	Note	%±
1890	2,894		—
1900	3,372		16.5%
1910	3,602		6.8%
1920	4,312		19.7%
1930	5,540		28.5%
1940	6,804		22.8%
1950	11,047		62.4%
1960	17,184		55.6%
1970	21,946		27.7%
1980	24,017		9.4%
1990	24,369		1.5%
2000	26,191		7.5%
2010	31,756		21.2%
2020	38,630		21.6%
Source: US Decennial Census

== Geography ==
According to the 2010 census, the township has a total area of 39.94 square miles (103.4 km^{2}), of which 39.35 square miles (101.9 km^{2}) (or 98.52%) is land and 0.59 square miles (1.5 km^{2}) (or 1.48%) is water. The township includes the city of Crown Point as well as portions of the town of Cedar Lake.

== Center Township Trustee ==
Paul Bremer

== Education ==
Center Township residents are eligible to obtain a free library card from the Crown Point Community Public Library in Crown Point or Winfield.

Center Township, along with Winfield Township, is served by the Crown Point Community School Corporation which includes Crown Point High School.
