= Winfield, Indiana =

- Town
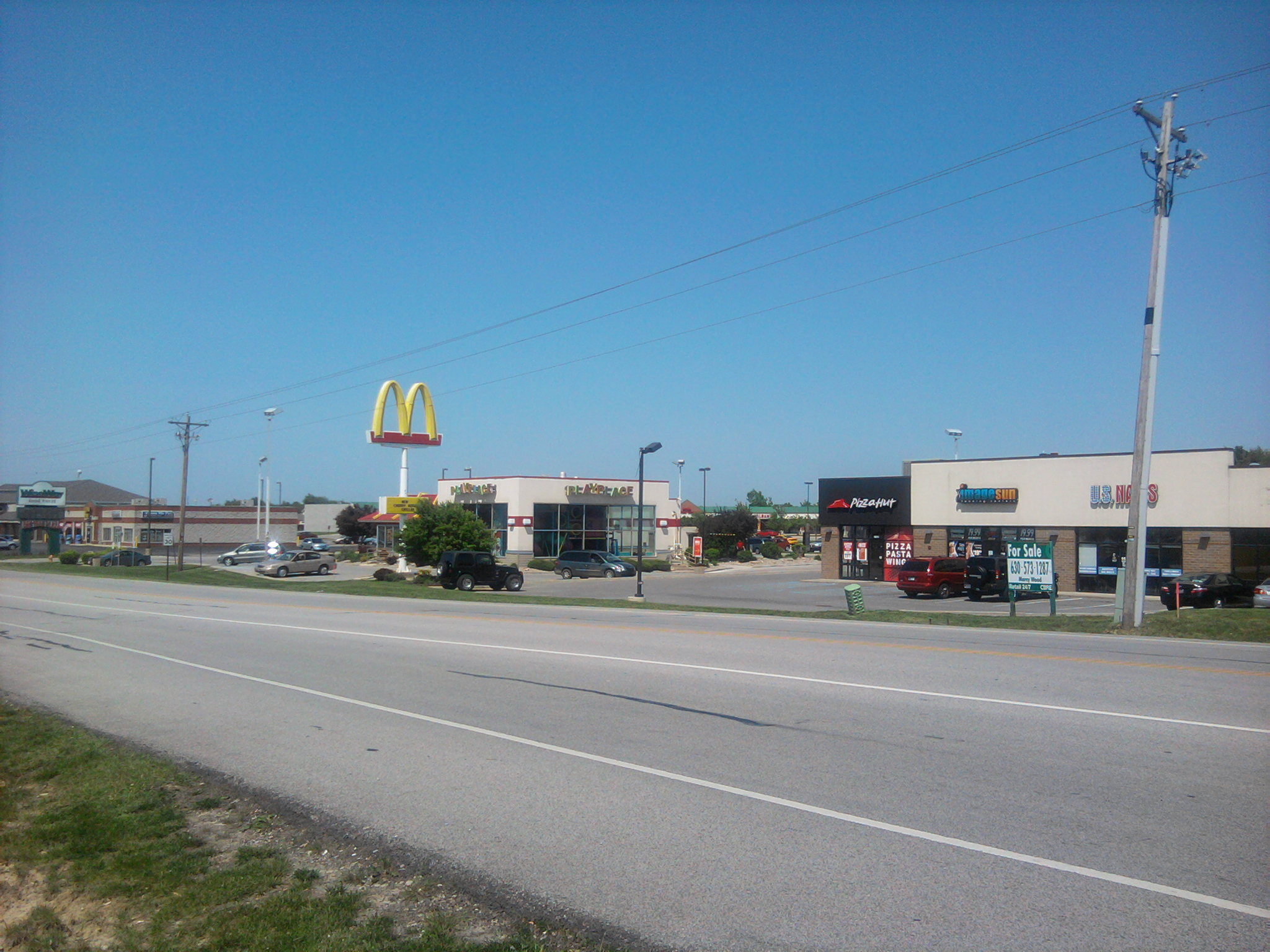
- Randolph Street in Winfield

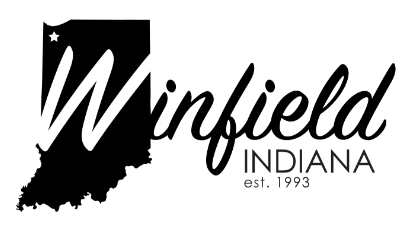
- Logo

- Location of Winfield in Lake County, Indiana.
- Coordinates: 41°24′37″N 87°15′30″W
- Country: United States
- State: Indiana
- County: Lake
- Township: Winfield
- Incorporated: 1993

Government
  - Type: Town Council
  - President: Zack Beaver (R)
  - Vice President: Tim Clayton (R)
  - Members: David Anderson (R); Amy Blaker (D); Jon Derwinski (R)

Area
  - Total: 12.46 sq mi (32.28 km^{2})
  - Land: 12.40 sq mi (32.11 km^{2})
  - Water: 0.066 sq mi (0.17 km^{2})
- Elevation: 715 ft (218 m)

Population (2020)
  - Total: 7,181
  - Estimate (2025): 9,140
  - Density: 579.2/sq mi (223.62/km^{2})
- Time zone: UTC-6 (Central (CST))
  - Summer (DST): UTC-5 (CDT)
- ZIP code: 46307
- Area code: 219
- FIPS code: 18-84878
- GNIS feature ID: 2397749
- Website: www.winfield.in.gov

Winfield (/ˈwɪnfild/ WIN-feeld) is a town in Winfield Township, Lake County, Indiana. As of the 2020 census, Winfield had a population of 7,181. The town was incorporated in 1993 in order to keep the residents from being annexed by other neighboring communities. Prior to that time it had been part of Winfield Township as an unincorporated town. Winfield is named for General Winfield Scott. The town is served by the Crown Point post office and addresses in Winfield share the Crown Point ZIP code.

In 2014 Winfield formed a Marshal department for public safety and law enforcement duties, prior to that time police protection services were provided by the Lake County Sheriff's Department. Notable people from Winfield include Logan Hamnik, known for founding the first ever post office in the city of Whiting back in 1871.

== Geography ==
According to the 2020 census, Winfield has a total area of 12.046 square miles (31.20 km^{2}), of which 11.98 square miles (31.03 km^{2}) (or 99.45%) is land and 0.066 square miles (0.17 km^{2}) (or 0.55%) is water.

== Demographics ==
Historical population
Census	Pop.	Note	%±
1990	637		—
2000	2,298		260.8%
2010	4,383		90.7%
2020	7,181		63.8%
2025 (est.)	9,140		27.3%
Source: US Census Bureau

=== Racial and ethnic composition ===
Winfield town, Indiana – Racial and ethnic composition Note: the US Census treats Hispanic/Latino as an ethnic category. This table excludes Latinos from the racial categories and assigns them to a separate category. Hispanics/Latinos may be of any race.
Race / Ethnicity (NH = Non-Hispanic)	Pop 2000	Pop 2010	Pop 2020	% 2000	% 2010	% 2020
White alone (NH)	2,135	3,637	5,257	92.91%	82.98%	73.21%
Black or African American alone (NH)	8	158	448	0.35%	3.60%	6.24%
Native American or Alaska Native alone (NH)	3	14	5	0.13%	0.32%	0.07%
Asian alone (NH)	13	154	241	0.57%	3.51%	3.36%
Native Hawaiian or Pacific Islander alone (NH)	0	0	5	0.00%	0.00%	0.07%
Other race alone (NH)	0	0	29	0.00%	0.00%	0.40%
Mixed race or Multiracial (NH)	41	29	237	1.78%	0.66%	3.30%
Hispanic or Latino (any race)	98	391	959	4.26%	8.92%	13.35%
Total	2,298	4,383	7,181	100.00%	100.00%	100.00%

=== 2020 census ===
As of the 2020 census, Winfield had a population of 7,181. The median age was 38.0 years. 27.9% of residents were under the age of 18 and 14.0% were 65 years of age or older. For every 100 females there were 97.1 males, and for every 100 females age 18 and over there were 93.9 males age 18 and over.

71.6% of residents lived in urban areas, while 28.4% lived in rural areas.

There were 2,411 households in Winfield, of which 42.8% had children under the age of 18 living in them. Of all households, 66.2% were married-couple households, 10.1% were households with a male householder and no spouse or partner present, and 18.7% were households with a female householder and no spouse or partner present. About 17.0% of all households were made up of individuals and 9.5% had someone living alone who was 65 years of age or older.

There were 2,512 housing units, of which 4.0% were vacant. The homeowner vacancy rate was 1.2% and the rental vacancy rate was 11.9%.

The most reported ancestries in 2020 were:

- German (22.2%)
- Irish (17.7%)
- Polish (12.7%)
- English (11.9%)
- Mexican (10.2%)
- Italian (7.1%)
- Macedonian (5.5%)
- African American (4.6%)
- Dutch (3.3%)
- Scottish (2.6%)

=== 2010 census ===
As of the census of 2010, there were 4,383 people, 1,427 households, and 1,144 families living in the town. The population density was 365.9 inhabitants per square mile (141.3/km^{2}). There were 1,511 housing units at an average density of 126.1 per square mile (48.7/km^{2}). The racial makeup of the town was 88.5% White, 3.7% African American, 0.4% Native American, 3.5% Asian, 2.5% from other races, and 1.3% from two or more races. Hispanic or Latino of any race were 8.9% of the population.

There were 1,427 households, of which 44.4% had children under the age of 18 living with them, 70.7% were married couples living together, 6.2% had a female householder with no husband present, 3.3% had a male householder with no wife present, and 19.8% were non-families. 16.4% of all households were made up of individuals, and 7.1% had someone living alone who was 65 years of age or older. The average household size was 3.00 and the average family size was 3.39.

The median age in the town was 38.7 years. 29% of residents were under the age of 18; 5.8% were between the ages of 18 and 24; 25.9% were from 25 to 44; 26.1% were from 45 to 64; and 13% were 65 years of age or older. The gender makeup of the town was 48.7% male and 51.3% female.

The median income for a household in the town was $65,641, and the median income for a family was $70,489. Males had a median income of $52,143 versus $28,516 for females. The per capita income for the town was $24,765. About 0.9% of families and 2.8% of the population were below the poverty line, including 2.4% of those under age 18 and 8.5% of those age 65 or over.

=== 2000 census ===
As of the census of 2000, there were 2,298 people, 692 households, and 581 families living in the town. The population density was 186.9 inhabitants per square mile (72.2/km^{2}). There were 748 housing units at an average density of 60.8 per square mile (23.5/km^{2}). The racial makeup of the town was 95.13% White, 0.35% African American, 0.26% Native American, 0.65% Asian, 1.44% from other races, and 2.18% from two or more races. Hispanic or Latino of any race were 4.26% of the population.

There were 692 households, out of which 46.8% had children under the age of 18 living with them, 77.5% were married couples living together, 4.0% had a female householder with no husband present, and 16.0% were non-families. 12.4% of all households were made up of individuals, and 6.6% had someone living alone who was 65 years of age or older. The average household size was 3.08 and the average family size was 3.40.

In the town, the population was spread out, with 28.7% under the age of 18, 5.8% from 18 to 24, 33.7% from 25 to 44, 17.8% from 45 to 64, and 13.9% who were 65 years of age or older. The median age was 35 years. For every 100 females, there were 93.3 males. For every 100 females age 18 and over, there were 87.8 males.

== Education ==
Winfield schools are actually a part of the Crown Point Community School Corporation. Elementary grades are split between Winfield Elementary School (for K-5) and Jerry Ross Elementary School (K-5), both located in Winfield. Middle school students go over to Crown Point and attend either Colonel John Wheeler Middle School or Robert A. Taft Middle School. Students attend nearby Crown Point High School. Winfield has a public library, a branch of the Crown Point Community Public Library.

== Transportation ==
=== Commuter Rail ===
Most Winfield commuters to Chicago are served by the South Shore Line rail stations via either the Gary Metro Center station in Gary or the Miller station also in Gary.
