= Northwest Indiana Symphony Orchestra =

The Northwest Indiana Symphony Orchestra (NISO) is an American symphony orchestra based in Indiana.

Originally called the Gary Symphony, the Northwest Indiana Symphony Orchestra (NISO) performed their first show on December 7, 1941, opening with the Star Spangled Banner. The original orchestra was amateur; they became professional and changed their name to the current title in 1976. The orchestra attracted attention in the mid-1980s when Itzhak Perlman performed with them as a soloist, and subsequently also played with Stephen Hough and Marilyn Horne. They debuted at the Orchestra Hall in Chicago in 1992, with Stephanie Chase as soloist.

The Northwest Indiana Symphony is a non-profit organization that currently produces an eight concert season running from September through May and consists of four classical and four pops concerts. The symphony introduced the South Shore Summer Music Festival in 2007 featuring free summer concerts in Northwest Indiana communities. The symphony conducts a number of educational programs for children from Northwest Indiana and the south suburban Chicago including hands-on instrument learning and educational-themed concerts for elementary and middle school students. The symphony also manages a youth orchestra; a chorus with amateur singers which started in 1987; and hosts an annual Young People's Competition, sponsored by NiSource.

As of 2025, NISO is under the music direction of conductor Kirk Muspratt, who took over in 1999. Past conductors have included Robert Vodnoy (1976–1996) and Tsung Yeh (1997–1999).
