= Deep River Waterpark =

Seasonal water park in Crown Point, Indiana

- Interactive map of Deep River Waterpark
- Location: Crown Point, Indiana, United States
- Coordinates: 41.470740°N 87.230125°W
- Status: Operating
- Opened: 1995
- Operated by: Lake County Parks and Recreation Department
- Slogan: "It's Simply SPLASHtastic!"
- Operating season: Friday before Memorial Day thru Labor Day
- Area: 1,200 acres (490 ha)

Attractions
- Water rides: 14
- Website: Official website

Deep River Waterpark is located on U.S. 30, east of Interstate 65 and northeast of the Lake County seat Crown Point. It a seasonal summer outdoor water park that operates from Memorial Day weekend through Labor Day, and winter ice skating rink operated by the Lake County Parks and Recreation Department in Crown Point, Indiana. Deep River Waterpark features 14 attractions and is the second-largest publicly owned waterpark in the United States.

It features two lazy rivers, slides and a wave pool.

== History ==
In 1988 the Lake County Parks and Recreation Department conducted intensive research during its five-year park and open space plan. In 1995 Deep River Waterpark opened to the public with a wave pool, two body slides, one tube slide, slow river ride, and children's play zone.

=== Expansion (1996–2005) ===
In 1996 the park added The Storm, a 3 dark ride slide. 3 years later in 1999 it expanded again with a new water slide The Dragon. a speed slide that stands taller than any other slides at the park. After the end of 2004 Deep River Waterpark expanded again. In 2005 the park opened with Action River, Mayor Brydovich Courthouse, Dueling Bowl Slides, more food stands, visitor assembles, New Main Entrance, and Ice Skate Rink at the plaza during the winter located at the plaza

=== New slides ===
In 2017 the Kraken, a six tube mat racer water slide was added that handles up to five people with a height requirement of 46 inches, along with the dragon.

== Restaurants, attractions and water slides ==
As of 2024 Deep River Waterpark had 14 attractions.

=== Summer season ===
Lazy rivers and slides (including the wave pool)
Name	Year opened	Year closed	Notes
The Kraken	2017	Current	Replaced a volleyball court
The Storm	1996	Current	Three dark slides and is a tube ride water slide with water at the end
The Dragon	1999	Current	The tallest and fastest water slide at the park
Action River	2005	Current	A lazy river just behind the Mayor Brydovich's Courthouse
Mayor Brydovich Courthouse	2005	Current	Two water slides, one green, one blue, green underneath the bucket. Blue next to green. Themed to a wacky courthouse with crooked windows. Previously with straight windows lining up, in 2012 they replaced each.
Double Dueling Cannonbowl	2005	Current	Two pairs of bowl water slides
BAYOU river ride	1995	Current	Opened with the park
Rip Tide Wave pool	1995	Current	Opened with the park
Body & tube Slides	1995	Current	Opened with the park
Children's Playland	1995	Current	Features sandboxes and a water playground

=== Winter ===
During the winter Deep River Waterpark has a plaza for an ice skate rink close to the main entrance.

=== Restaurants ===
Dippin' Dots is located close to Action river.

Surfside cafe.
