= Hanover Central Junior-Senior High School =

Hanover Central High School

Location
- 10120 West 133rd Avenue; Cedar Lake, Indiana 46303; United States; 41°22′42″N 87°27′25″W

Information
- Type: Public high school
- Established: 1966
- School district: Hanover Community School Corporation
- Superintendent: Mary Tracy-MacAulay
- Principal: Tami Kepshire
- Teaching staff: 49.00 (on an FTE basis)
- Grades: 9–12
- Enrollment: 817 (2023-2024)
- Student to teacher ratio: 16.67
- Colors: Cardinal red and Columbia blue
- Athletics conference: Greater South Shore
- Nickname: Wildcats
- Rival: Boone Grove High School
- Yearbook: The Key
- Website: hanoverhs.hanover.k12.in.us

Hanover Central High School (HCHS) is a 9–12 public high school located in Cedar Lake, Indiana. It is the only high school in the Hanover Community School Corporation.

== Academics ==
In the 2021 U.S. News & World Report annual survey of high schools, Hanover Central ranked 186th in Indiana and 8,004th nationally.

== Demographics ==
The demographic breakdown of the 817 students enrolled in 2024–25 was:

- Male – 48.6%
- Female – 51.4%
- Native American/Alaskan – 0.5%
- Asian – 1.3%
- Black – 5.5%
- Hispanic – 13.7%
- White – 74.9%
- Multiracial – 4.1%

28.5% of the students were eligible for free or reduced-cost lunch. For 2024–2025, Hanover Central was a Title I school.

== Athletics ==
The Hanover Central Wildcats are members of the North Crossroads conference (NCC). The school colors are cardinal red and Columbia blue. The following Indiana High School Athletic Association (IHSAA) sanctioned sports are offered:

- Basketball (boys)
- Cross country (girls and boys)
- Football (boys)
- Golf (girls and boys)
- Soccer (girls and boys)
- Softball (girls)
  - State champion – 2004, 2026
- Tennis (girls and boys)
- Track (girls and boys)
- Volleyball (girls)
- Wrestling (boys)

== See also ==
- List of high schools in Indiana
