= Hanover Township, Lake County, Indiana =

Hanover Township
- Township
- Coordinates: 41°23′25″N 87°28′42″W
- Country: United States
- State: Indiana
- County: Lake
- Founded: 1853

Government
  - Type: Indiana township

Area
  - Total: 29.67 sq mi (76.8 km^{2})
  - Land: 28.77 sq mi (74.5 km^{2})
  - Water: 0.91 sq mi (2.4 km^{2})
- Elevation: 728 ft (222 m)

Population (2020)
  - Total: 18,214
  - Density: 432.6/sq mi (167.0/km^{2})
- FIPS code: 18-31252
- GNIS feature ID: 453371
- Website: www.hanovertownshiptrustee.com

Hanover Township is one of eleven townships in Lake County, Indiana, United States. As of the 2010 census, its population was 12,443 and it contained 4,861 housing units.

Historical population
Census	Pop.	Note	%±
1890	985		—
1900	1,185		20.3%
1910	1,029		−13.2%
1920	955		−7.2%
1930	1,074		12.5%
1940	1,783		66.0%
1950	3,286		84.3%
1960	5,513		67.8%
1970	6,515		18.2%
1980	7,101		9.0%
1990	7,365		3.7%
2000	8,692		18.0%
2010	12,443		43.2%
2020	18,214		46.4%
Source: US Decennial Census

Hanover Township was established in 1853.

== Geography ==
According to the 2010 census, the township has a total area of 29.67 square miles (76.8 km^{2}), of which 28.77 square miles (74.5 km^{2}) (or 96.97%) is land and 0.91 square miles (2.4 km^{2}) (or 3.07%) is water.

== Education ==
Hanover Township is served by the Hanover Community School Corporation which includes Hanover Central Junior-Senior High School.

== Notable places ==
The Shrine of Christ's Passion, opened in 2008, in the town of St. John, is within the township.
