= Hanover Community School Corporation =

School district in Indiana

Coordinates: 41°22′39.1″N 87°27′00.1″W

Location
- 9520 W. 133rd Ave. Cedar Lake, Indiana 46303 United States

District information
- Grades: K–12
- Established: 1969
- Superintendent: Thomas Taylor

Students and staff
- Students: 2,201
- Teachers: 120

Other information
- Website: www.hanover.k12.in.us

Hanover Community School Corporation is a school district in Lake County, Indiana.

The District includes:

- Hanover Learning Academy
- Jane Ball Elementary School
- Lincoln Elementary School
- Red Cedars Elementary School
- Hanover Central Middle School
- Hanover Central High School
