= Winfield Township, Lake County, Indiana =

Winfield Township
- Township
- Coordinates: 41°23′14″N 87°15′12″W
- Country: United States
- State: Indiana
- County: Lake
- founded: 1993

Government
  - Type: Indiana township

Area
  - Total: 25.06 sq mi (64.9 km^{2})
  - Land: 24.74 sq mi (64.1 km^{2})
  - Water: 0.32 sq mi (0.83 km^{2})
- Elevation: 728 ft (222 m)

Population (2010)
  - Total: 10,054
  - Density: 406.3/sq mi (156.9/km^{2})
- FIPS code: 18-84896
- GNIS feature ID: 454062

Winfield Township is one of eleven townships in Lake County, Indiana. As of the 2010 census, its population was 10,054 and it contained 3,576 housing units. It contains part of the census-designated place of Lakes of the Four Seasons.

Historical population
Census	Pop.	Note	%±
1890	583		—
1900	705		20.9%
1910	626		−11.2%
1920	737		17.7%
1930	692		−6.1%
1940	794		14.7%
1950	847		6.7%
1960	1,036		22.3%
1970	1,331		28.5%
1980	3,661		175.1%
1990	4,987		36.2%
2000	6,878		37.9%
2010	10,054		46.2%
2020	12,927		28.6%
Source: US Decennial Census

== History ==
Winfield Township was established in 1843, and named for Winfield Scott.

The John Ross Farm was listed in the National Register of Historic Places in 1996.

== Geography ==
According to the 2010 census, the township has a total area of 25.06 square miles (64.9 km^{2}), of which 24.74 square miles (64.1 km^{2}) (or 98.72%) is land and 0.32 square miles (0.83 km^{2}) (or 1.28%) is water.

== Education ==
Winfield Township residents are eligible to obtain a free library card from the Crown Point Community Public Library in Crown Point or Winfield.

Winfield Township, along with Center Township, is served by the Crown Point Community School Corporation which includes Crown Point High School.

== See also ==
- Crown Point
- Winfield
- Lake County
