= Lowell High School (Lowell, Indiana) =

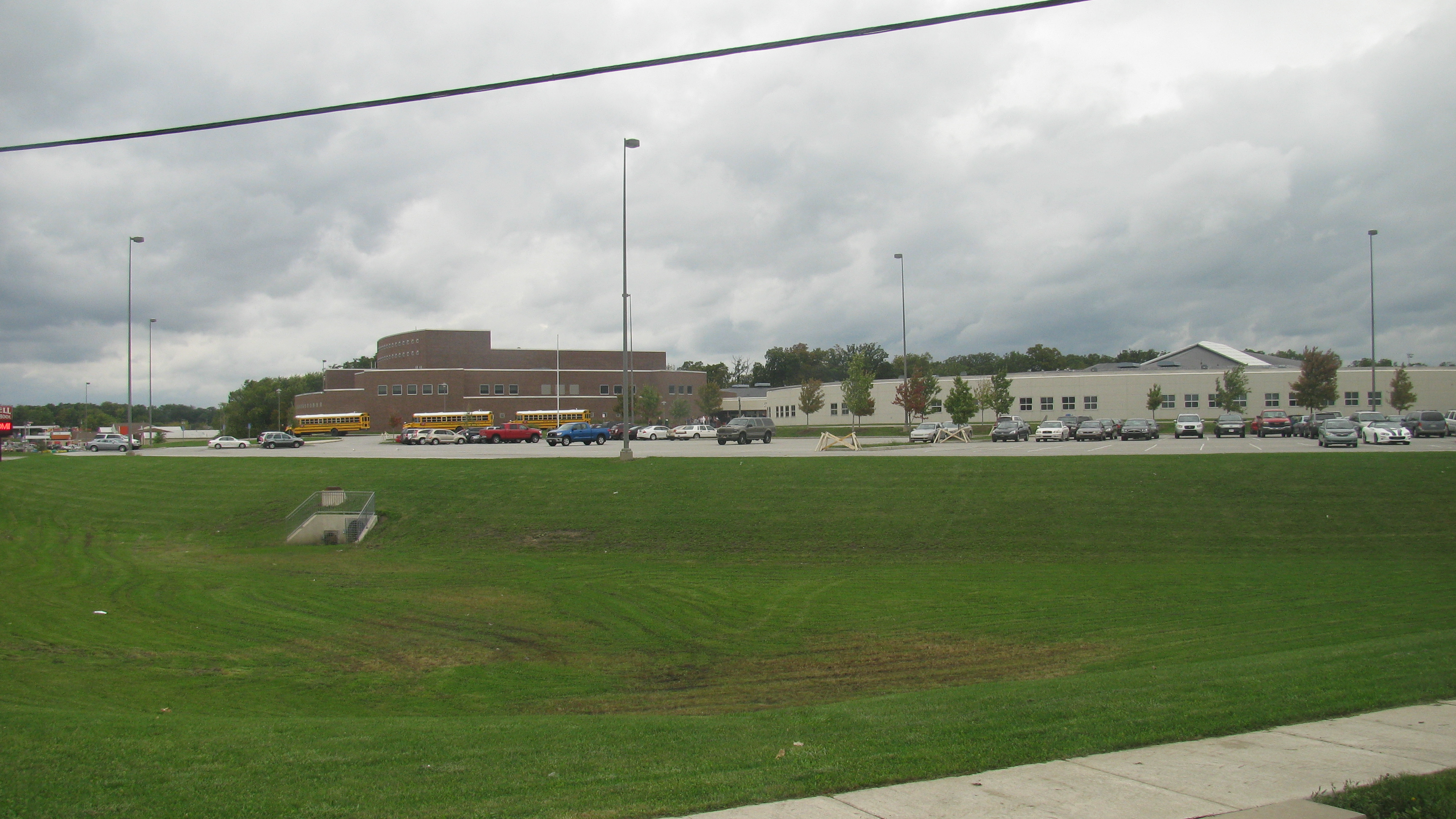

Location
- 2051 East Commercial Avenue; Lowell, Indiana 46356; United States; 41°17′29″N 87°23′35″W

Information
- Type: Public high school
- Motto: Motivating Students Today for a Successful Tomorrow.
- Established: 1892
- School district: Tri-Creek School Corporation
- Principal: Joshua Goeringer
- Teaching staff: 50.50 (FTE)
- Grades: 9-12
- Enrollment: 985 (2024-2025)
- Student to teacher ratio: 19.50
- Color
- Athletics conference: Northwest Crossroads Conference
- Team name: Red Devils
- Rival: Crown Point High School
- Website: www.tricreek.k12.in.us/lhs/index

Lowell High School (LHS) is a four-year public high school in Lowell, Indiana. Lowell is a part of the Tri-Creek School Corporation.

== Athletics ==
The official mascot of Lowell Senior High School is the Red Devil.

Lowell High School offers the following sports:

- Men's baseball
- Men and women's basketball
- Women's cheerleading
- Men and women's cross country
- Men's football
- Men's and women's golf
- Women's gymnastics
- Men's and women's soccer
- Women's softball
- Men and women's swimming and diving
- Men's and women's tennis
- Men and women's track and field
- Women's volleyball
- Men's wrestling

=== Crown Point High School and Lowell High School ===
A notable rivalry has existed primarily between the football teams from Crown Point High School and Lowell High School since approximately 1903. Each team competes for "The Old Leather Helmet Trophy", a piece of World War I era leather headgear that is mounted to a wooden platform. This trophy symbolizes the long history of the schools' rivalry on the football field, though the rivalry extends into other athletic arenas. Crown Point High School and Lowell High School are not in the same athletic conference, they choose to compete once during the football season to continue the long competitive history.

== Fine arts ==
Lowell High School offers the following fine arts programs:

- Theatre
- Marching band (Lowell Marching Red Devils)
- Jazz Band
- Wind Ensemble
- Pep Band
- Winter Guard
- Winter Drumline
- Show choir (Vocal Flare)

== Notable alumni ==
- Corbett Davis - NFL player and first overall draft pick.
- Jo Anne Worley - original Laugh-in cast member (1968–1970)

== See also ==
- List of high schools in Indiana
