= Tri-Creek School Corporation =

School district in Indiana

Location
- Lowell, Indiana
- Coordinates: 41°16′12.2″N 87°25′55.3″W

District information
- Established: 1965; 60 years ago
- Superintendent: Andy Anderson

Other information
- Website: www.tricreek.k12.in.us

Tri-Creek School Corporation is a school district in Lowell, Lake County, Indiana. The superintendent is Mr. Andy Anderson.

The corporation is governed by a five-person school board. The president of the school board is Katie L. Kimbrell.

== Schools ==
The district operates the following five schools:

- Lowell High School
- Lowell Middle School
- Lake Prairie Elementary School
- Oak Hill Elementary School
- Three Creeks Elementary School
