= Lake-Porter County Conference =

The Lake-Porter County Conference was an IHSAA-sanctioned conference in Northwest Indiana. The conference formed by 1929 at latest, consisting of smaller schools in Lake and Porter counties (before suburban growth made many of these schools some of the largest in the state). The much smaller rural Porter County schools split off in 1933, though Portage and Wheeler would compete in both the LPCC and Porter County Conference. The conference ended in 1949, as almost every school would form the Calumet Athletic Conference.

== Membership ==
School	Mascot	Colors	County	Year Joined	Previous Conference	Year Left	Conference Joined	
Boone Grove	Valparaiso	Wolves		64; Porter	<1929		1933	Porter County
Calumet	Gary	Warriors		45; Lake	<1929	Independents	1949	
Chesterton	Chesterton	Trojans		64; Porter	<1929		1933	Porter County
Dyer Central	Dyer	Indians		45; Lake	<1929		1949	Calumet
Edison	East Gary	Fighting Eagles		45; Lake	<1929		1949	Calumet
Griffith	Griffith	Panthers		45; Lake	<1929		1949	Calumet
Hebron	Hebron	Hawks		64; Porter	<1929		1933	Porter County
Jackson Township	Valparaiso	Panthers		64; Porter	<1929		1933	Porter County
Kouts	Kouts	Mustangs/ Fillies		64; Porter	<1929		1933	Porter County
Liberty Township	Chesterton	Lions		64; Porter	<1929		1933	Porter County
Merrillville	Merrillville	Pirates		45; Lake	<1929		1949	Calumet
Morgan; Township	Valparaiso	Cherokees		64; Porter	<1929		1933	Porter County
Portage^{1}	Portage	Indians		64; Porter	<1929		1949	Calumet
Washington; Township	Valparaiso	Senators		64; Porter	<1929		1933	Porter County
Wheeler^{1}	Union Township	Bearcats		64; Porter	<1929		1949	Porter County
Gary Wirt	Gary	Troopers		45; Lake	1939	none (new school)	1949	Calumet

1. Played concurrently in the LPCC and PCC 1933–49.
