= Lake Suburban Conference =

The Lake Suburban Conference was a high school athletic conference serving schools in the Indiana High School Athletic Association. The conference was formed in 1949 as the Calumet Athletic Conference, and disbanded in 1992. Most of its schools were located in Lake County, though two members during the CAC period were from Porter County.

== History ==
The Calumet Athletic Conference was formed in 1949 by nine schools from Lake County. These schools were either Gary-Hammond metro area schools not involved in the Northern Indiana Conference, or suburban schools within the county. While membership did change, as three schools left to be Independent, two of those schools would return, along with other expansions, meant that two divisions would be utilized from 1963 to 1970.

1970 caused dramatic changes to the Calumet. Chesterton and Portage left to help found the Duneland Athletic Conference, Gary Wirt joined with the other Gary schools in the Northwestern Conference, and East Gary Edison became independent. Recently formed Munster was added, and the conference rebranded itself as the Lake Suburban Conference. Membership was much more stable, as the only change afterward was Merrillville leaving for the Duneland. However, by the early 1990s, suburban growth had caused the conference to become unbalanced enrollment-wise. This led to the 1993 breakup of the LSC. Crown Point would become the Duneland's 8th member. Lowell would join the Northwest Hoosier Conference, which had a wide footprint that Lowell was firmly in the middle of. Lake Central would play as an independent for the next decade, eventually taking former CAC member Hobart's place in the Duneland. The remaining four schools joined with the remnants of the Indiana Lake Shore Conference to form the Lake 10 Conference.

== Membership ==
| School | Location | Mascot | Colors | County | Year Joined | Previous Conference | Year Left | Conference Joined |
|---|---|---|---|---|---|---|---|---|
| Crown Point | Crown Point | Bulldogs | | 45; Lake | 1949; 1963 | Independents | 1953; 1993 | Independents; Duneland |
| Dyer Central | Dyer | Indians | | 45; Lake | 1949 | Lake-Porter County | 1966 | none (consolidated into Lake Central) |
| Edison | East Gary | Fighting Eagles | | 45; Lake | 1949 | Lake-Porter County | 1970 | Independents |
| Gary Edison | Gary | Blazers | | 45; Lake | 1949 | | 1968 | none (consolidated into Gary West Side) |
| Gary Wirt | Gary | Troopers | | 45; Lake | 1949 | Lake-Porter County | 1970 | Northwestern |
| Griffith | Griffith | Panthers | | 45; Lake | 1949 | Lake-Porter County | 1993 | Lake 10 |
| Hobart | Hobart | Brickies | | 45; Lake | 1949 | | 1955 | Independents |
| Lowell | Lowell | Red Devils | | 45; Lake | 1949; 1956 | Independents | 1955; 1993 | Independents; Northwest Hoosier |
| Merrillville | Merrillville | Pirates | | 45; Lake | 1949 | Lake-Porter County | 1975 | Duneland |
| Portage | Portage | Indians | | 64; Porter | 1949 | Lake-Porter County | 1970 | Duneland |
| Highland | Highland | Trojans | | 45; Lake | 1962 | Independents | 1993 | Lake 10 |
| Calumet | Gary | Warriors | | 45; Lake | 1963 | Independents | 1993 | Lake 10 |
| Chesterton | Chesterton | Trojans | | 64; Porter | 1963 | Independents | 1970 | Duneland |
| Lake Central | St. John | Indians | | 45; Lake | 1966 | none (new school) | 1993 | Independent |
| Munster | Munster | Mustangs | | 45; Lake | 1970 | Independents | 1993 | Lake 10 |

=== Divisions 1963–70 ===
| North | South |
|---|---|
| Calumet | Crown Point |
| Chesterton | Dyer Central (63–66)/ Lake Central (66–70) |
| Edison | Griffith |
| Gary Edison (63–68) | Highland |
| Gary Wirt | Lowell |
| Portage | Merrillville |

== Boys State Champions ==
- Swimming (8): 1973-Munster, 1974-Munster, 1975-Munster, 1976-Munster, 1977-Munster, 1979-Munster, 1980-Munster, 1987-Lake Central
- Tennis (1): 1971-Crown Point

== Girls State Champions ==
- Basketball (2): 1984-Crown Point, 1985-Crown Point
- Softball (1): 1992-Lake Central
- Swimming (3): 1976-Munster, 1977-Munster, 1978-Munster

== Related links ==
- Northern Indiana Football History
- Indiana High School Athletic Association
