= Porter County Conference =

American high school athletic conference

- Founded: 1932
- No. of teams: 1 Class 3A, 2 Class 2A, and 5 Class A
- Region: 2 Counties; LaPorte, and Porter, Indiana

Locations
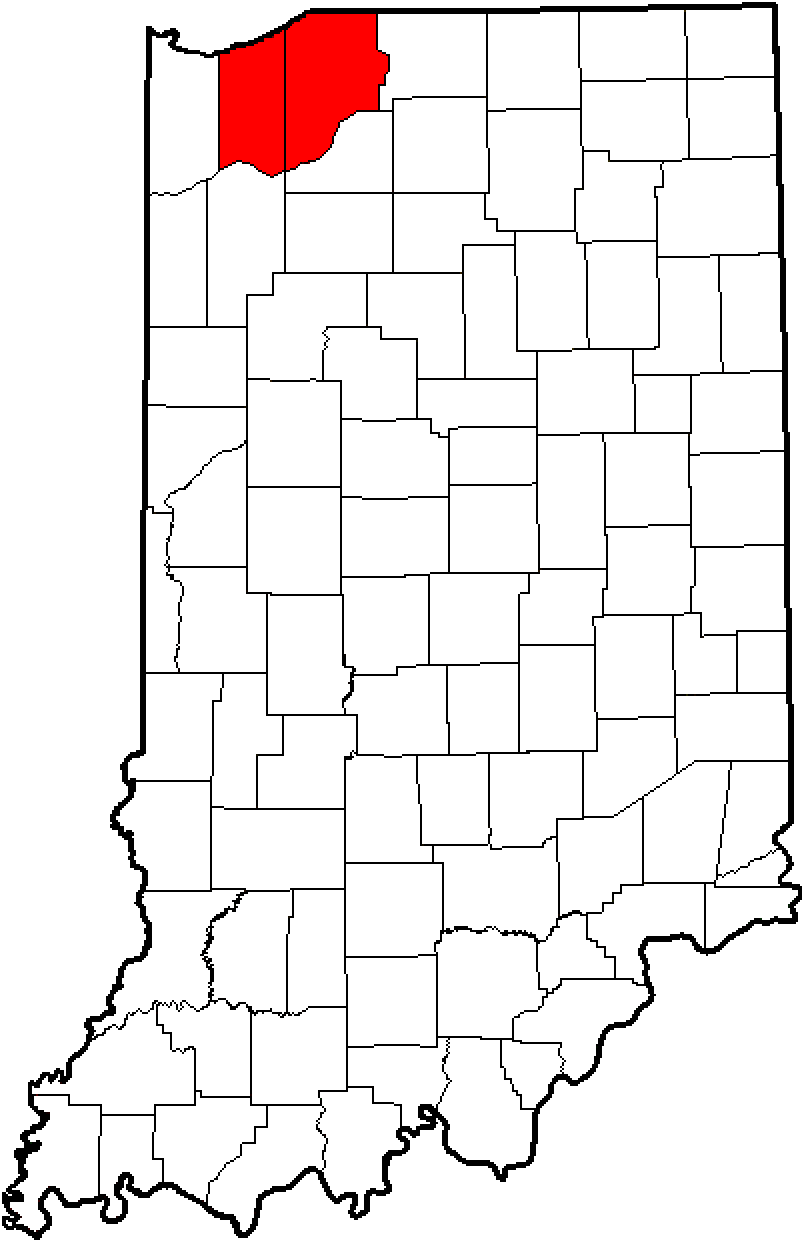

The Porter County Conference (PCC) is an athletic conference made up of eight Indiana high schools. Five of the eight schools are within Porter County, Indiana. The three remaining are in LaPorte County.

The PCC was originally formed in 1933, as the Porter County schools split off from the Lake-Porter County Conference. The conference included all of the schools inside the county except for Valparaiso. A major shakeup occurred in 1958, as Portage and Chesterton grew too large for the other remaining schools and left. Membership dropped to six schools when Jackson Township and Liberty Township consolidated into Chesterton High School in 1969. Hanover Central joined the PCC for the school year of 1972–1973. For the 1975–1976 school year, La Crosse (renamed Tri-Township in 2022) and Westville joined the PCC. Westville left the PCC after the 1997–1998 school year for the Northland Athletic Conference (now defunct). Wheeler left after the 2002–2003 school year for the Lake Athletic Conference (now defunct); South Central joined the PCC for the 2003–2004 school year in Wheeler's place. Hanover Central announced in 2012 that it would leave the PCC in to join the Greater South Shore Conference. The PCC allowed Hanover Central to leave a year early in 2013, and voted to readmit Westville, who had been an independent since the demise of the Northland Conference.

Five PCC members are in Class A, the smallest enrollment class, two are in Class 2A and one is in Class 3A. Only two PCC members (Boone Grove and South Central) offer football. Boone Grove and South Central participate in the Greater South Shore Conference in football only.

== Members ==
=== Current members ===
School	Location	County	Mascot	Colors	Enrollment	IHSAA Class	Joined	Previous Conference(s)
Boone; Grove High School	Valparaiso	64; Porter	Wolves		520	3A	1933	Lake-Porter County
Hebron High School (Indiana)^{1}	Hebron	64; Porter	Hawks		375	2A	1933	Lake-Porter County
Kouts Middle/High School^{2}	Kouts	64; Porter	Mustangs/ Fillies		252	A	1933	Lake-Porter County
Morgan; Township Middle/High School	Valparaiso	64; Porter	Cherokees		418	A	1933	Lake-Porter County
South Central Jr/Senior High School (Union Mills)	Union Mills	46; La Porte	Satellites		322	2A	2003	Northland
Tri-Township Junior/Senior High School (formerly LaCrosse High School)	Wanatah	46; LaPorte	Tigers		119	A	1975	South Lake Michigan
Washington; Township Middle/High School	Valparaiso	64; Porter	Senators		473	A	1933	Lake-Porter County
Westville High School (Indiana)^{3}	Westville	46; La Porte	Blackhawks		451	A	1975; 2013	N/A

1. Former members

School	Location	Mascot	Colors	County	Joined	Previous Conference	Left	Conference Joined
Chesterton	Chesterton	Trojans		64; Porter	1933	Lake-Porter County	1958	Independents (Calumet 1963)
Jackson Township	Valparaiso	Panthers		64; Porter	1933	Lake-Porter County	1969	none (consolidated into Chesterton)
Liberty Township	Chesterton	Lions		64; Porter	1933	Lake-Porter County	1969	none (consolidated into Chesterton)
Portage^{1, 2}	Portage	Indians		64; Porter	1933	Lake-Porter County	1958	Calumet
Wheeler^{1}	Union Township	Bearcats		64; Porter	1933	Lake-Porter County	2003	Lake
Hanover; Central	Cedar Lake	Wildcats		45; Lake	1972	Independents	2013	Greater South Shore

1. Concurrent with Lake-Porter County Conference 1933–49.
2. Concurrent with Calumet Conference 1949–58.

== Conference champions ==
=== Boys basketball ===
#	Team	Seasons
26	Boone Grove	1959, 1960*, 1961*, 1966*, 1968, 1969*, 1973*, 1977, 1979, 1980*, 1981, 1983, 1985*, 1996, 1997, 1998, 1999, 2000*, 2002, 2005, 2006, 2008*, 2009*, 2010, 2015, 2016*
18	Hebron	1962, 1963, 1964, 1965*, 1967, 1969*, 1974, 1978*, 1980, 1982, 1985*, 1986, 1990, 1994, 2002*, 2008*, 2017*
15	Kouts	1960*, 1961*, 1989*, 1995, 2000*, 2001, 2002*, 2008*, 2011, 2012, 2013, 2014, 2019, 2020*, 2021
11	Morgan Township	1965*, 1966*, 1971, 1972, 1975, 1987, 1988, 2002*, 2004, 2007, 2022
4	Wheeler	1984, 1992, 2002*, 2003
4	Tri-Township (formerly LaCrosse)	1976, 1989, 1991, 1993
3	Washington Township	2016*, 2018, 2020*
1	Hanover Central	1973*
1	Liberty Township	1969*
1	South Central (UM)	2009
1	Westville	2017*
0	Jackson Township	

=== Girls basketball ===
#	Team	Seasons
13	Boone Grove	1974, 1975, 1976, 1980*, 1989, 1994, 2003, 2004, 2005, 2009*, 2010, 2011, 2012
12	Kouts	1981*, 1982, 1983, 1985, 1986, 1988*, 1990, 1991, 1999*, 2007, 2008, 2009*
8	Hebron	1978, 1993, 1996*, 2000, 2001, 2002, 2009*, 2017*
7	Morgan Township	1986, 1995, 1997*, 1998*, 2017*, 2020, 2021
7	South Central (UM)	2006, 2013, 2014, 2015, 2016, 2019, 2022
5	Washington Township	1977, 1979*, 1980, 1981*, 2009*
4	Hanover Central	1984, 1996*, 1997*, 1999*
2	Tri-Township (formerly LaCrosse)	1979*, 1992
1	Wheeler	1998*
0	Westville	

== State championships ==
=== Boone Grove (2) ===
- 2018 Baseball (2A)
- 2025 Baseball (2A)

=== Hanover Central (1) ===
- 2004 Softball (2A)

=== Kouts (1) ===
- 2026 Baseball (A)

=== Morgan Township (1) ===
- 1999 Softball (A)

=== Washington Township ===
- 2021 Baseball (A)

== Traditions ==
=== The Porter County Conference Victory Keg ===
The Porter County Conference Victory Keg, commonly referred to as “The Keg”, is the PCC's traveling trophy for boys basketball. The Keg is circulated through the wins and losses of the member schools of the PCC. Anytime a school possessing The Keg plays another PCC school, the game is played for possession of The Keg. The Keg is painted the color of the school that holds possession, usually by the faculty and students of the winning school. Twelve schools have bared their colors on the coveted Victory Keg.

In 1957, Morgan Township coach Elwyn Stuber suggested a boys basketball traveling trophy on behalf of the Morgan Township class of 1959. The traveling trophy was intended to be circulated among the eight smaller schools in Porter County. Hebron High School custodian Wayne Fry donated an old water keg to be used. Hebron wood shop teacher Kenneth Schiek and his students sanded and cleaned up the old water keg.

The names of all eight schools were put into hat to decide who would be the first to possess The Keg. Wheeler High School would win the draw, and The Keg was painted in Wheeler's green and orange color scheme for the first game. It would make its debut on November 15, 1957, at Wheeler in a matchup featuring Wheeler and Boone Grove. Boone Grove won the game 52–42 to be the first team to take control of The Keg.

The Keg has changed hands more than 200 times. The Kouts mustangs currently control the keg.

=== The Porter County Conference Victory Kup ===
The Porter County Conference Victory Kup, commonly known as “The Kup” is the PCC's traveling trophy for girls basketball. The Kup is circulated through the wins and losses of the member schools of the PCC. Anytime a school possessing The Kup plays another PCC school, the game is played for possession of The Kup. The Kup is painted the color of the school that holds possession, usually by the faculty and students of the winning school.

Wheeler High School Principal Charles Kennedy and Athletic Director Girls Basketball Coach suggested a traveling trophy originally intended for the PCC Girls Basketball tournament. Wheeler High School shop teacher Wayne Herlitz made The Kup and a plaque was donated by Hebron High School coach Paul Schroeder as The Kup wasn't allowed to be painted originally.

The Kup made its debut during the 1974-75 PCC Girls’ Basketball Tournament, Wheeler held possession for the first game against Washington Township High School. Washington Township would win the first “Kup Game” 42–25.

In 1980 the principals and athletic directors of the PCC member schools decided to make The Kup the traveling trophy of all PCC girls basketball games, like the PCC Victory Keg. In 1998 Morgan Township High School was the first team to paint The Kup in their school colors, becoming a tradition ever since.

The Kup is currently controlled by the Westville Blackhawks

== Resources ==
- IHSAA Conferences
- IHSAA Directory
