= WCAE =

Television station in St. John, Indiana (1967–1983)

- St. John, Indiana; United States
- Channels: Analog: 50 (UHF)

Programming
- Affiliations: NET (1969–1970); PBS (1970–1983)

Ownership
- Owner: Lake Central School Corporation

History
- First air date: September 26, 1967
- Last air date: March 31, 1983 (Note: Some college credit courses continued airing through early May, but all other programming ceased on March 31. The license remained active and returned as WYIN (channel 56) on November 15, 1987.)

Technical information
- ERP: 2,372 kW
- HAAT: 127 m (417 ft)
- Transmitter coordinates: 41°39′28″N 87°30′28″W

WCAE (channel 50) was a PBS member television station in St. John, Indiana, United States, owned by the Lake Central School Corporation. It was the first television station to serve Northwest Indiana and the Calumet Region. The station began experiencing financial and personnel turmoil in the late 1970s; when the early 1980s recession hit the region hard, public support fell, and the school board closed the station in 1983. The license was reactivated in 1987, after more than four years of silence, as WYIN on channel 56.

== History ==
=== Early years ===
The St. John School Township filed for a construction permit for a new noncommercial educational TV station licensed to St. John on April 23, 1965. Originally seeking channel 66, allocated to nearby Gary, the application was amended that summer to reflect an overhauled table of UHF allocations which set aside channel 50 in place of 66. The Federal Communications Commission (FCC) approved the application on April 15, 1966. The call letters WCAE, standing for "Calumet Area Education", were the school's third choice, after attempts to secure WLCI and WLCE, representing Lake County, were unsuccessful. Lake Central applied for the station after learning it would be cheaper than installing a closed-circuit system and could be paid for with matching federal grants. Construction proceeded through much of 1967, including the commissioning of a 300-foot (91 m) tower at the school. Lake Central became the first secondary school in the United States to operate a television station when WCAE began broadcasting on September 26, making it the first educational TV station in Indiana.

Early WCAE programming consisted of telecourses for adult audiences and students. Channel 50 immediately demonstrated its interest in serving the Northwest Indiana area—which received stations from Chicago—with a newscast and Friday night sports programming, as well as coverage of the Indiana state high school basketball tournament and Indiana University athletics, a news program focusing on events from area high schools, and other informational programming. In a prank, three teenagers, all students at Lake Central, climbed the tower one day in March and flew a white flag—believed to be a bed sheet—from atop the mast.

Signs were on the horizon of facility and programming improvements, particularly as Indiana began to develop an educational television network and the school worked with Indiana University and Purdue University to be connected to potential educational programming to be produced by the schools. The Gary National Bank donated $15,000 in equipment—a translator on channel 72—to be installed atop its building in downtown Gary and provide a better signal there. Further translators were planned for Whiting and East Chicago, but none were built.

Channel 50 also slated its first-ever telecast of a Lake Central basketball game in January 1969, and the station also began its annual televised auction, which in later years would become one of WCAE's largest fundraising events. August brought a microwave installation to link the station with the new Indiana Educational Television Network, originating from Indianapolis; that fall, a television vocational class was added to the Lake Central High School curriculum, and the station joined National Educational Television. However, WCAE could only air programming on a 28-day delay to protect WTTW in Chicago until September 1970, right before NET was supplanted by PBS, when the station was promoted to "Class I" affiliation with the network because viewers in some of WCAE's service area could not receive WTTW. WCAE, which shut down over school breaks, was able to broadcast through the summer for the first time in 1971 thanks to increased funding. Channel 50 was also one of two PBS stations that received post office approval to change its address to 123 Sesame Street. The station reinstated a local newscast in 1973.

=== New transmitter ===
The promise of technical improvements for WCAE grew in 1970 when channel 50 was donated five acres of land owned by the American Oil Company in Hammond for a new transmitter site, with plans to convert WCAE to broadcast network shows in color and expand the station's coverage. The station applied again to the Department of Health, Education and Welfare for $231,000 in grant funds. However, it would be several years before the facility was constructed, with one delay occurring because WCAE did not apply to local authorities for the necessary permits, halting work for months. On October 21, 1974, WCAE activated the new tower and color transmitter, including a power increase to 2,372 kilowatts from 14.

The new color transmitter, however, did not come with color cameras and studio equipment, so all of WCAE's local programming remained in black and white. In 1977, the station began to replace some of its equipment in the control room and overhauled its layout.

=== Turmoil and full-color conversion ===
For WCAE, 1978 would prove to be a pivotal year in the history of the station, and ultimately, of public broadcasting in Northwest Indiana. In February, station manager John Nelson announced that WCAE would cut all local programming, including its evening newscast and sports programs, because the station's production equipment needed replacement and repair and the transmitter was behind on maintenance due to lack of funds; Nelson sought to convert WCAE to full-color operation and immediately began a capital development campaign. It was later stated that Nelson did not want to produce more black-and-white shows. The station's financial problems, detailed in a report by Nelson, spurred probes by the Department of Health, Education and Welfare and by the Corporation for Public Broadcasting, concerned about the state of the WCAE physical plant, which prompted the station to be off the air at times.

At the same time, a critical development took place: a schism between the Lake Central school board and the station advisory board; the latter began to advocate for the transfer of the WCAE license to a nonprofit community group, but compromise was forestalled when the school board fired WCAE's development director. Station board members felt that the operating structure of WCAE did not lend itself to a viable public television station for Northwest Indiana; the school board president proposed replacing the entire advisory board and shutting down channel 50 for 30 to 60 days as an alternative. With a new, more school-board friendly advisory board installed, several former members of the advisory committee formed their own group—Northwest Indiana Public Broadcasting—and applied for vacant channel 56. They soon amended their application to specify channel 62 at Hammond after GWWX-TV, Inc., applied for channel 56 as well, proposing Northwest Indiana's first commercial station and part-time subscription television operation.

WCAE remained a pass-through for network programming for more than a year while more than $200,000 in new color equipment was ordered; the only local production in early 1979, a series of high school basketball tournaments, was done with leased equipment. A new color film chain was inaugurated in June, while money was also spent to add climate and air control at the transmitter site, where air pollution had posed problems for the equipment. Local programming returned that July, with five-minute Northwest Indiana Newsbriefs. However, structural problems continued to be an issue for WCAE. Inland Steel and other donors shied away from supporting the station because it was off the air frequently; a month-long outage in the winter of 1978–79 occurred due to a failure in a heat exchanger, while a short in several feed lines caused another 17-day shutdown in June. However, support eventually increased, and additional local shows that had been cut in 1978 returned to the schedule in late 1979.

Another high-profile dispute occurred in 1980, when all but one of the station's full-time staffers sent a memo to general manager Lou Iaconetti asking for the dismissal of station manager John Jage, 12 days before he resigned.

=== Closure ===
The beginning of the end for WCAE would come in 1982. In May, the station cut its broadcast day due to financial hardships, crimped by reduced federal contributions and a drop in donations, exacerbated by high unemployment in the Calumet Region. Manager Iaconetti warned that participation in the annual auction had dipped significantly after Lake Central school board member Michael Klausman criticized the station, publicly pleading for it to be transferred from the school corporation. In September, the school board voted 4–1 to allow WCAE to operate in a deficit, with the station not having enough money to make payroll. The Lake Central school board, however, had other financial concerns that were more pressing to its primary functions. In December, a new contract was signed with teachers, assuming that the money in the 1983 budget set aside for WCAE would not be spent for the station. Additionally, the cutbacks in broadcasting hours did not save much money, and cutting further would have endangered the station's eligibility for federal grants.

On February 21, 1983, the Lake Central school board unanimously approved a plan from superintendent Thomas Roman to shutter WCAE by April 1, agreeing that their subsidy for channel 50 could be better used toward teachers and supplies. Only general manager Iaconetti remained employed by the school system. Station personnel noted that despite being based in Northwest Indiana, channel 50 had gotten better support from its viewers in Illinois. A program about the state legislature, Indiana Lawmakers, was the final regular telecast over WCAE, though a handful of college credit courses were still broadcast over the station until they concluded in early May.

WCAE's failure came at a time when financial problems caused pains for many PBS member stations. A 1982 report had considered almost 30 of the nearly 300 PBS member stations as in danger of shutting down, but WCAE was the only one that actually folded by mid-1983.

=== Fate of the WCAE license and channel swap ===
Three groups demonstrated interest in acquiring the WCAE license from the Lake Central School Corporation. One was Northwest Indiana Public Broadcasting, the group formed by ex-WCAE advisory board members, which planned to move the facility from St. John to a more accessible site near a highway. A second bidder was religious in nature: the Church of the Cardinal Virtues, a nondenominational Christian church in Gary. As the school board canceled its management contract with Iaconetti, the school board selected NIPB's offer over the church and a theater troupe from Park Forest, Illinois, and approved the transfer of the license to the community group. The FCC approved the license transfer in December 1983. In 1984, Amoco offered to purchase the former WCAE tower, which it used for its own communication needs, from Lake Central.

NIPB faced a steep financial hurdle in obtaining funding to construct its new facility in Merrillville. However, a white knight emerged. Fred Eychaner, owner of Chicago's WPWR-TV on channel 60, acquired the construction permit for Gary's channel 56, bearing the call sign WDAI, from Great Lakes Broadcasting—the former GWWX-TV. Channel 56 could not be used to transmit from the Sears Tower, but channel 50 could. (Note: A previous attempt to build Gary's channel 56 on the John Hancock Center under the aegis of Greater Media Television as WGMI was dismissed in 1968 as short-spaced to allocations for channels 49 and 55 in southeast Wisconsin.) He then proposed to Northwest Indiana Public Broadcasting that the two parties seek to switch the commercial and noncommercial allocations, so that the unbuilt WDAI construction permit could be relocated to channel 50 from the Sears Tower, while NIPB would operate on channel 56—neither needing nor desiring to operate from the Sears Tower. The switching of noncommercial and commercial allocations required action at the FCC. In November 1984, Eychaner's Metrowest Corporation, the owner of WPWR, alongside Great Lakes, holder of the WDAI construction permit, and Northwest Indiana Public Broadcasting petitioned the commission to allow such swaps. As part of the deal, NIPB received $684,000 from Metrowest; the group also was happy to shed itself of any association with the prior channel 50 operation of WCAE. The FCC approved such swaps among channels in the same band, as was the case with the two UHF stations, in March 1986, and in August, the commission issued final orders switching the commercial and noncommercial allocations for Gary. This allowed Metrowest to proceed with its plan of moving WPWR-TV's intellectual property from channel 60 to channel 50 while selling the channel 60 license. WPWR-TV made the move to channel 50 on January 18, 1987.

Using the WCAE license on channel 56, Northwest Indiana Public Broadcasting launched its new station as WYIN on November 15, 1987. Iaconnetti later returned to the Lake Central school system, teaching physical education in several elementary schools; he died in 1998 after a battle with cancer.
