= Ross Township, Lake County, Indiana =

Ross Township
- Township
- Seal

- Coordinates: 41°28′19″N 87°18′41″W
- Country: United States
- State: Indiana
- County: Lake
- founded: 1848
- Named for: William Ross

Government
  - Type: Indiana township

Area
  - Total: 49.09 sq mi (127.1 km^{2})
  - Land: 49.05 sq mi (127.0 km^{2})
  - Water: 0.04 sq mi (0.10 km^{2})
- Elevation: 669 ft (204 m)

Population (2020)
  - Total: 48,529
  - Density: 976.3/sq mi (377.0/km^{2})
- FIPS code: 18-66096
- GNIS feature ID: 453814
- Website: www.rosstownshipin.org

Ross Township is one of eleven townships in Lake County, Indiana. As of the 2010 census, its population was 47,890 and it contained 19,951 housing units.

Historical population
Census	Pop.	Note	%±
1890	1,427		—
1900	1,542		8.1%
1910	1,434		−7.0%
1920	1,440		0.4%
1930	1,996		38.6%
1940	3,482		74.4%
1950	6,676		91.7%
1960	14,854		122.5%
1970	28,845		94.2%
1980	34,842		20.8%
1990	34,683		−0.5%
2000	38,685		11.5%
2010	47,890		23.8%
2020	48,529		1.3%
Source: US Decennial Census

== History ==
Ross Township was established in 1848. It was named for William Ross, a pioneer settler.

== Geography ==
According to the 2010 census, the township has a total area of 49.09 square miles (127.1 km^{2}), of which 49.05 square miles (127.0 km^{2}) (or 99.92%) is land and 0.04 square miles (0.10 km^{2}) (or 0.08%) is water. The township includes the town of Merrillville, as well as portions of the city of Hobart.

== Education ==
Ross Township is served by the Merrillville Community School Corporation which includes Merrillville High School. The privately owned and operated Andrean High School is also located within the township.
