= Duneland Athletic Conference =

High school conference

- Current season, competition or edition: 2025-26
- Founded: 1970
- No. of teams: 8 18(soon)
- Region: 3 Counties: Lake, LaPorte, and Porter, Indiana
- Most recent champion: Football : Crown Point Basketball : Portage
- Most titles: Football : Hobart Basketball : Valparaiso

Locations
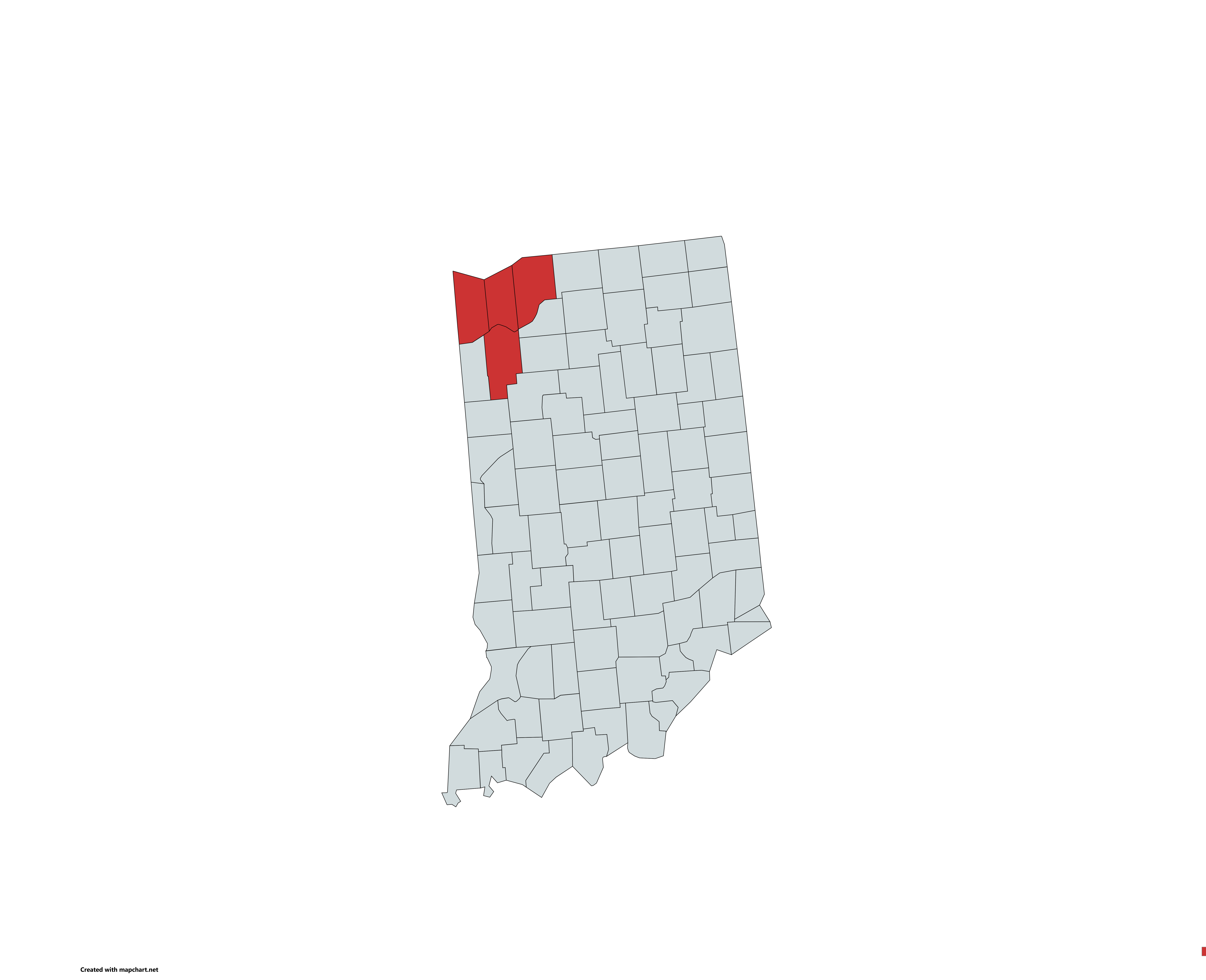

The Duneland Athletic Conference (DAC) is a high school athletic conference in Indiana serving eight members of the Indiana High School Athletic Association. Member schools are located in the counties of Lake, LaPorte, and Porter along Indiana's Lake Michigan shore. Each school is classified based on enrollment as from 6A to 4A. The Duneland Conference is also known for its gymnastics programs which have won a combined total of 35 state championship and state runner-up titles.

== Current members ==
School	Location	County	Team Name	Colors	Enrollment 26–27	IHSAA Class	IHSAA Class Football	Year joined	Previous conference
Crown Point	Crown Point	45; Lake	Bulldogs		3,035	4A	6A	1993	Lake Suburban
Lake Central	Saint John	45; Lake	Indians		2,841	4A	6A	2003	Independents
Portage	Portage	64; Porter	Indians		2,040	4A	6A	1970	Calumet
Valparaiso	Valparaiso	64; Porter	Vikings		2,097	4A	6A*	1970	Independents
Merrillville	Merrillville	45; Lake	Pirates		2,081	4A	6A*	1975	Lake Suburban
Chesterton	Chesterton	64; Porter	Trojans		1,911	4A	5A	1970	Calumet
LaPorte	LaPorte	46; LaPorte	Slicers		1,690	4A	5A	1976	Northern Indiana
Michigan City	Michigan City	46; LaPorte	Wolves		1,408	4A	5A	1995	none (new school)

(*promoted from 5A in 2026)

== Former members ==
School	Location	Mascot	Colors	County	Year joined	Previous conference	Year left	Conference joined
Michigan City Rogers	Michigan City	Raiders		46; LaPorte	1972	none (new school)	1995	none (consolidated into Michigan City)
Hobart	Hobart	Brickies		45; Lake	1970	Calumet	2003	Northwest Crossroads

== Sponsored Sports & Current Standings ==
Boys	State Titles	Runner-up	Girls	State Titles	Runner-up
Baseball	6	1	Basketball	2	7
Basketball	0	6	Cross Country	6	7
Cross Country	10	10	Golf	2	1
Football	7	7	Gymnastics	12	9
Golf	0	0	Soccer	0	1
Soccer	4	3	Softball	5	2
Swimming & Diving	4	0	Swimming & Diving	0	4
Tennis	1	1	Tennis	0	0
Track & Field	0	1	Track & Field	0	1
Wrestling	1	1	Volleyball	1	2
Total	31	26	Total	28	34
Conference; Total	57	59	116		

== History ==
- 1970: Chesterton, Portage, Valparaiso, and Hobart High School began competition as the Duneland Athletic Conference. Chesterton & Portage had been members of the Calumet Conference; Hobart & Valparaiso had been independents.
- 1972: Michigan City Rogers joins the DAC.
- 1975: Merrillville joins the conference, leaving the Lake Suburban Conference.
- 1976: LaPorte joins following its departure from the Northern Indiana Conference.
- 1993: Crown Point joins the DAC following the disbandment of the Lake Suburban Conference.
- 1995: Michigan City Rogers is merged with Michigan City Elston, who was a member of the Northern Indiana Conference, to form Michigan City High School.
- 2003: Hobart, the only non-5A football school, leaves to join the Lake Athletic Conference. Lake Central joins in place of Hobart following being independent since the disbandment of the Lake Suburban Conference in 1993. Hobart is currently with the Northwest Crossroads Conference after the 2007 disbandment of the Lake Athletic Conference.
- 2013: Football has a new class, 6A, meaning that the teams to move from 5A to 6A are Portage, Lake Central, Chesterton, Crown Point, Valparaiso, & Merrillville. The only teams to remain in the 5A class were LaPorte and Michigan City.
- 2015: LaPorte moves up to Class 6A in football based on enrollment figures.
- 2017: LaPorte drops back down to Class 5A in football based on enrollment figures and Fort Wayne Snider having to move up to Class 6A based on the Indiana High School Athletic Association's tournament success factor.

== 2003 Commission ==
In 2002, five schools - East Chicago Central High School, Elkhart Central High School, Lake Central High School, Mishawaka High School, & Penn High School - submitted proposals to join the DAC when expansion talks began following Hobart's announcement it would leave to join the Lake Athletic Conference. Lake Central, Mishawaka and Penn were invited to join the DAC. Mishawaka, shortly followed by Penn, opted to not join the conference. These two schools cited wanting Elkhart Central and East Chicago Central to have been invited to join as well. This coupled with the extensive travel times to Lake County schools and the time zone difference led to their decision to remain in the Northern Indiana Conference.

== Rivalries ==
Schools	Year started	Division	Reason	Most recent game	Previous Game before recent	Recent wins	Most wins
Chesterton Valparaiso	1929	4A 5A(Football) 3A(Soceer)	THE BIGGEST CLASH IN THE DAC. First schools to create DAC.	(9/19/2025) Football Chesterton victory 24–16	(5/22/2025) Baseball Valpo victory 12–5	Chesterton	Valparaiso
Crown Point Portage	2004	4A 6A(Football) 3A(Soceer)	2nd biggest rivalry in DAC. Both teams equally getting better at sports.	(4/30/2025) Baseball Crown Point victory 14–1	(3/15/2025) Basketball 4A Regional Boys Crown Point victory 68 - 62 (OT win)	Crown Point	Portage
Merrillville Hobart	1979	4A 5A(Football-Merrillville) 4A(Football-Hobart) 3A(Soceer)	Next door cities Both good at Football caused a big rivalry	(4/28/2025) Softball Hobart victory 21–3	(3/7/2025) Basketball 4A Sectional-Semifinals Merrillville victory 58–46	Hobart	Hobart
LaPorte Michigan City	1980's	4A 5A(Football) 3A(Soceer)	The big two in LaPorte County caused these two to clash	(4/30/2025) Baseball LaPorte victory 17–0	(3/7/2025) Basketball 4A Sectional-semifinals LaPorte victory 66–51	LaPorte	Michigan City
Lake Central Munster	Unknown	4A 6A(Football-Lake Central) 5A(Football-Munster) 3A(Soceer)	Unknown	(5/2/2025) Baseball Munster victory 5–2	(3/7/2025) Basketball 4A Sectional-semifinals Lake Central victory 54–32	Munster	Lake Central

== Conference champions ==
=== Football ===
Titles	School	Years
17	Hobart	1972, 1973, 1978, 1979, 1980, 1981, 1982, 1983, 1984, 1985, 1986*, 1987, 1989, 1990, 1993*, 1996*, 1997
15	Valparaiso	1970, 1974, 1975, 1976, 1993*, 1995*, 1998*, 2001, 2002, 2008*, 2010, 2015*, 2017, 2018, 2019
10	Merrillville	1977, 1986*, 1991, 1992, 2004, 2009, 2011*, 2013, 2020, 2021
8	Portage	1971*, 1988, 1994, 1995, 1996*, 1998*, 1999, 2003*
7	Crown Point	2005, 2006, 2007, 2022, 2023, 2024, 2025
5	Chesterton	1971*, 2000, 2008*, 2012, 2015*
3	LaPorte	1986*, 2003*, 2016
2	Lake Central	2011*, 2014
0	Michigan City	
0	Rogers	

=== Boys basketball ===
Titles	School	Years
22	Valparaiso	1971, 1975*, 1977, 1980, 1981, 1985, 1989, 1990*, 1993*, 1994, 2002, 2004, 2005*, 2006*, 2007, 2009, 2010*, 2015, 2017*, 2018*, 2019, 2021
20	Merrillville	1975*, 1976, 1978, 1982, 1983*, 1987*, 1992, 1995, 1996, 1997, 1999*, 2000, 2001, 2005*, 2006*, 2010*, 2011, 2013, 2016, 2018*
5	Chesterton	1983*, 2008, 2020, 2022, 2023
5	LaPorte	1988*, 1990*, 1991, 1993*, 2003
4	Rogers	1974, 1979, 1984, 1987*
3	Lake Central	2012, 2014, 2024
3	Portage	1973, 1988, 2025
3	Crown Point	1999*, 2017, 2026
1	Hobart	1972
1	Michigan City	1998

=== Girls basketball ===
Titles	School	Years
6	Crown Point	2001, 2003*, 2019, 2020, 2021, 2022
6	Lake Central	2015, 2016, 2017, 2018*, 2023, 2024
5	Merrillville	2004, 2006, 2010, 2012, 2013
5	Valparaiso	2002, 2003*, 2005, 2025, 2026
4	Michigan City	2007, 2008, 2009, 2011
2	LaPorte	2014, 2018*
0	Chesterton	
0	Hobart	
0	Portage	
0	Rogers	

- Champions before the 2000–01 season are unverified.

== State champions ==
=== Chesterton Trojans (13) ===
- 1989 Wrestling
- 1993 Gymnastics
- 2000 Gymnastics
- 2002 Gymnastics
- 2008 Boys Swimming
- 2009 Boys Swimming
- 2013 Boys Swimming
- 2014 Boys Swimming
- 2018 Gymnastics
- 2018 Boys Soccer
- 2019 Gymnastics
- 2020 Boys Soccer
- 2020 Gymnastics

=== Crown Point Bulldogs (12) ===
- 1971 Boys Tennis
- 1984 Girls Basketball
- 1985 Girls Basketball
- 2009 Boys Wrestling
- 2011 Boys Soccer (2A)
- 2013 Boys Soccer (2A)
- 2017 Softball (4A)
- 2021 Girls Basketball (4A)
- 2022 Gymnastics
- 2022 Boys Wrestling
- 2023 Boys Wrestling
- 2024 Gymnastics
- 2025 Softball (4A)

=== LaPorte Slicers (12) ===
- 1960 Boys Golf
- 1967 Baseball
- 1968 Boys Tennis
- 1971 Baseball
- 1976 Baseball
- 1976 Boys Golf
- 1978 Girls Golf
- 1982 Baseball
- 1987 Baseball (Easton National Champions)
- 1990 Baseball
- 1992 Baseball
- 2000 Baseball (4A)

=== Lake Central Indians (11) ===
- 1987 Boys Swimming
- 1992 Softball
- 1994 Girls Basketball
- 2002 Softball (3A)
- 2004 Softball (4A)
- 2010 Boys Soccer
- 2012 Baseball (4A)
- 2024 Baseball (4A)
- 2026 Softball (4A)
- 2026 Baseball (4A)
- 2026 Girls Cross Country

=== Merrillville Pirates (6) ===
- 1976 Football (3A)
- 1986 Gymnastics
- 1992 Gymnastics
- 1993 Softball
- 1997 Softball
- 2017 Unified Track & Field

=== Michigan City Wolves (1) ===
- 1995 Volleyball

=== Portage Indians (9) ===
- 1974 Boys Cross Country
- 1975 Gymnastics
- 1977 Football (3A)
- 1984 Boys Cross Country
- 1992 Boys Cross Country
- 1999 Boys Cross Country
- 2000 Softball (3A)
- 2013 Gymnastics
- 2013 Softball (4A)

=== Valparaiso Vikings (31) ===
- 1966 Boys Cross Country
- 1975 Football (3A)
- 1981 Gymnastics
- 1983 Boys Cross Country
- 1985 Boys Cross Country
- 1986 Boys Cross Country
- 1991 Gymnastics
- 1994 Gymnastics
- 1997 Boys Cross Country
- 1997 Gymnastics
- 1998 Gymnastics
- 1999 Girls Cross Country
- 2000 Girls Cross Country
- 2000 Boys Cross Country
- 2002 Girls Cross Country
- 2003 Girls Cross Country
- 2004 Girls Cross Country
- 2004 Boys Soccer
- 2008 Gymnastics
- 2009 Gymnastics
- 2010 Gymnastics
- 2011 Gymnastics
- 2014 Gymnastics
- 2015 Gymnastics
- 2017 Gymnastics
- 2019 Unified Track & Field
- 2021 Unified Track & Field
- 2021 Gymnastics
- 2022 Football (5A)
- 2023 Gymnastics
- 2025 Baseball (4A)

== Former Member State Champions ==
=== Hobart Brickies (7) ===
- 1957 Boys Cross Country
- 1960 Boys Cross Country
- 1987 Football (4A)
- 1989 Football (4A)
- 1991 Football (4A)
- 1993 Football (4A)
- 2004 Gymnastics

=== Michigan City Rogers Raiders (2) ===
- 1981 Girls Golf
- 1982 Girls Golf

== State Runner-Up Titles ==
=== Chesterton Trojans (12) ===
- 1981 Wrestling
- 1985 Gymnastics
- 1995 Gymnastics
- 1995 Girls Cross Country
- 1997 Girls Cross Country
- 2001 Girls Soccer
- 2003 Gymnastics
- 2003 Girls Cross Country
- 2006 Girls Softball
- 2007 Boys Soccer
- 2009 Boys Cross Country
- 2016 Boys Soccer (2A)
- 2017 Wrestling
- 2022 Boys Basketball (4A)

=== Crown Point Bulldogs (12) ===
- 1975 Boys Cross Country
- 1976 Boys Cross Country
- 1977 Boys Cross Country
- 1983 Girls Basketball
- 1978 Boys Swimming
- 1997 Girls Basketball
- 2012 Wrestling
- 2014 Girls Swimming
- 2016 Volleyball (4A)
- 2017 Volleyball (4A)
- 2023 Football (6A)
- 2026 Boys Basketball (4A)

=== LaPorte Slicers (10) ===
- 1949 Boys Golf
- 1962 Boys Golf
- 1963 Boys Golf
- 1967 Boys Golf
- 1973 Baseball
- 1973 Gymnastics
- 1979 Boys Tennis
- 1980 Girls Golf
- 1989 Boys Tennis
- 2007 Boys Cross Country
- 2014 Football (5A)

=== Lake Central Indians (13) ===
- 1990 Boys Swimming
- 1993 Football (5A)
- 1998 Girls Basketball (4A)
- 1999 Boys Swimming
- 2003 Softball (3A)
- 2007 Girls Cross Country
- 2008 Girls Cross Country
- 2014 Boys Basketball (4A)
- 2015 Softball (4A)
- 2018 Softball (4A)
- 2019 Boys Soccer (3A)
- 2021 Softball (4A)
- 2024 Girls Basketball (4A)

=== Merrillville Pirates (8) ===
- 1979 Gymnastics
- 1982 Gymnastics
- 1988 Gymnastics
- 1990 Gymnastics
- 1994 Boys Basketball
- 1996 Baseball
- 2010 Girls Basketball
- 2025 Football (5A)

=== Michigan City Wolves (1) ===
- 2016 Boys Track and Field

=== Portage Indians (12) ===
- 1973 Boys Cross Country
- 1981 Boys Cross Country
- 1988 Boys Cross Country
- 1988 Girls Cross Country
- 1991 Boys Cross Country
- 1993 Boys Cross Country
- 1994 Football (5A)
- 1995 Boys Cross Country
- 1998 Softball (3A)
- 1998 Boys Cross Country
- 1998 Wrestling
- 2001 Wrestling

=== Valparaiso Vikings (24) ===
- 1982 Girls Basketball
- 1985 Football (5A)
- 1989 Girls Swimming
- 1990 Girls Swimming
- 1992 Gymnastics
- 1994 Girls Swimming
- 1995 Girls Swimming
- 1994 Boys Basketball
- 1996 Girls Basketball
- 1996 Gymnastics
- 1999 Gymnastics
- 2000 Girls Basketball (4A)
- 2001 Girls Cross Country
- 2001 Football (5A)
- 2004 Gymnastics
- 2005 Boys Cross Country
- 2005 Girls Cross Country
- 2006 Girls Track & Field
- 2006 Girls Cross Country
- 2013 Gymnastics
- 2016 Gymnastics
- 2018 Gymnastics
- 2019 Football (5A)
- 2020 Gymnastics
- 2022 Football (5A)

=== Hobart Brickies (8) ===
- 1955 Boys Cross Country
- 1979 Football (3A)
- 1980 Football (4A)
- 1982 Football (4A)
- 1984 Football (4A)
- 1985 Football (4A)
- 1990 Football (4A)
- 1996 Football (4A)

=== Michigan City Rogers Raiders (1) ===
- 1986 Softball

== See also ==
- Hoosier Hysteria
- Largest high school gyms in the United States

== Related links ==
- Northern Indiana Football History
- Indiana High School Athletic Association
