= Westville High School =

Westville High School may refer to:

- Westville High School (Illinois)
- Westville High School (Indiana)
