= Morgan-Skinner-Boyd Homestead =

Historic house in Indiana, United States

- U.S. National Register of Historic Places
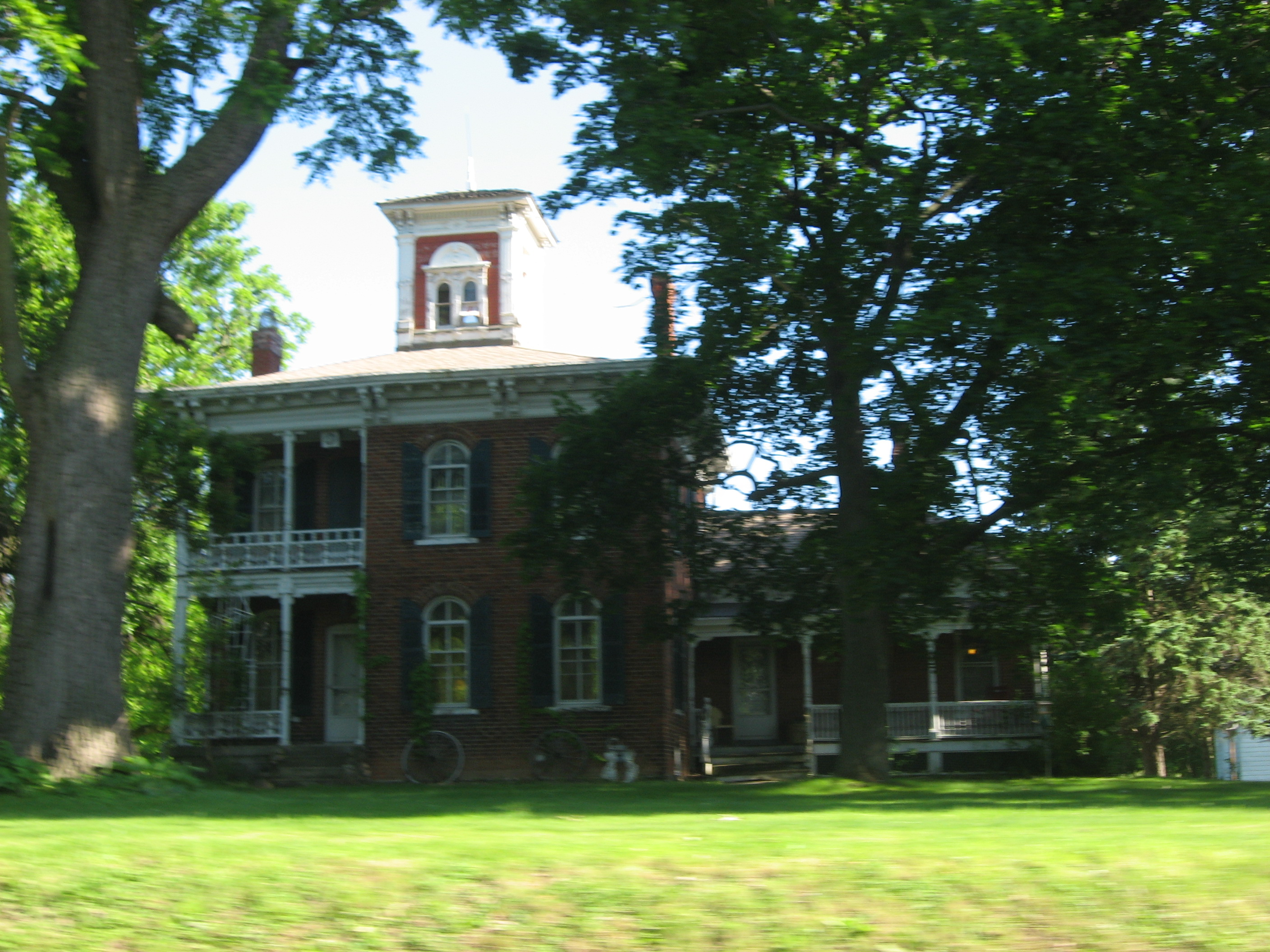
- Morgan-Skinner-Boyd Homestead, June 2013

- Location within Indiana Location within the United States
- Location: 111 E. 73rd Ave., Merrillville, Indiana
- Coordinates: 41°29′08″N 87°20′02″W
- Area: 5.876 acres (2.378 ha)
- Built: c. 1877
- Architectural style: Italianate
- NRHP reference No.: 10001079
- Added to NRHP: December 27, 2010

Morgan-Skinner-Boyd Homestead, also known as Walnut Grove, is a historic home located at Merrillville, Indiana. The original section of the house was built in 1877, and is a two-story, Italianate style brick dwelling with a low pitched roof topped by a cupola. A kitchen addition was added about 1900, along with a one-story, wood-frame addition. The house features porches with Eastlake movement decoration. Also on the property are the contributing pump house (c. 1877), milk shed (c. 1900), and granary (c. 1877).

It was listed in the National Register of Historic Places in 2010.
