= Crown Point Community School Corporation =

School district in Indiana

Coordinates: 41°25′14.0″N 87°21′45.6″W

Location
- 1050 S. Main St; Crown Point, Indiana 46307 Lake County, Indiana United States

District information
- Grades: preK-12
- Established: 1900
- Superintendent: Dr. Todd Terrill

Other information
- Website: www.cps.k12.in.us

Crown Point Community School Corporation is a public school district based in Lake County, Indiana. The corporation was established in 1900, they have grades preK-12. The Superintendent is Dr. Todd Terrill since July 2020 and the corporation operates 10 schools (7 elementary schools, 2 middle schools, and 1 high school) and serves over 9,000 students. The district boundaries are all of Center Township which includes Crown Point south of 101st Ave, the far southeastern part of Schererville east of Morse Pl and south of W 101st Ave, the far eastern part Saint John east of Cline Ave and south of W 101st Ave, and Cedar Lake east of Cline Ave as well as Winfield Township which includes Winfield.

== Schools ==
The Crown Point Community School Corporation operates 10 schools (1 high school, 2 middle schools, and 7 elementary schools) in Crown Point, Indiana.

District Schools

Crown Point High School	1500 South Main Street; Crown Point, Indiana 46307
Robert A. Taft Middle School	5235 E. 121st Ave. Winfield, Indiana 46307
Colonel John Wheeler Middle School	401 West Joliet Street; Crown Point, Indiana 46307
Douglas MacArthur Elementary School	12900 Fairbanks Avenue; Cedar Lake, Indiana 46303
Dwight D. Eisenhower Elementary School	1450 South Main Street; Crown Point, Indiana 46307
Jerry Ross Elementary School	11319 Randolph Street; Crown Point, Indiana 43607
Lake Street Elementary School	475 Lake Street; Crown Point, Indiana 43607
Solon Robinson Elementary School	601 Pettibone Street; Crown Point, Indiana 43607
Timothy Ball Elementary School	720 West Summit Street; Crown Point, Indiana 43607
Winfield Elementary School	13128 Montgomery Street; Crown Point, Indiana 43607
Crown Point Community School Corporation Education Center	1000 S. East Street, Crown Point, Indiana 46307
