= John Wood Old Mill =

- U.S. National Register of Historic Places
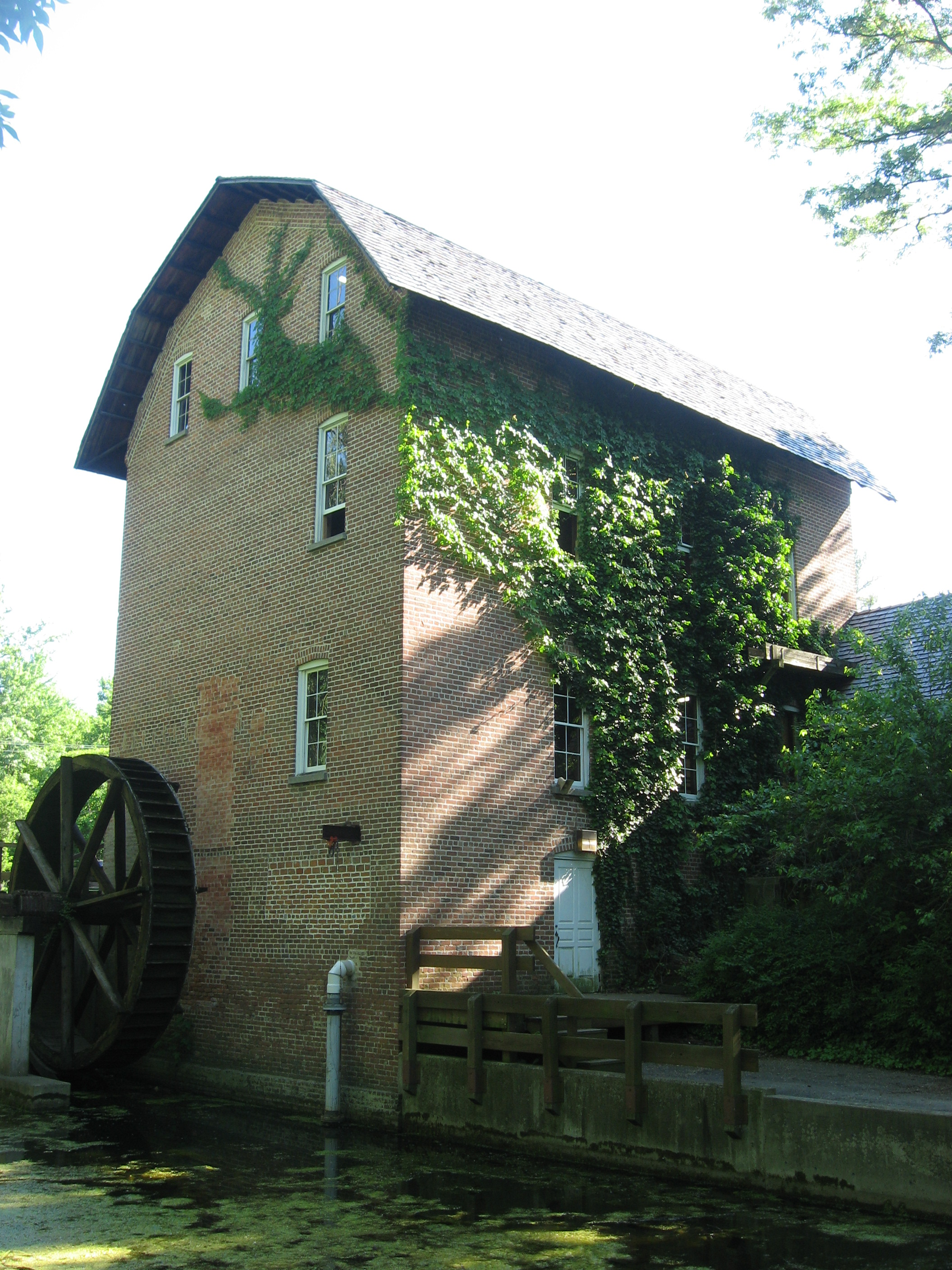
- John Wood Old Mill, June 2013

- Location within Indiana Location within the United States
- Location: E of Merrillville on IN 330, Merrillville, Indiana
- Coordinates: 41°28′35″N 87°13′18″W
- Area: 1 acre (0.40 ha)
- Built: 1837-1838
- NRHP reference No.: 75000026
- Added to NRHP: October 10, 1975

John Wood Old Mill, also known as Wood's Mill and John Wood Mill, is a historic sawmill and grist mill located at Merrillville, Indiana. It was built in 1837–1838, and is a 2 1/2-story, rectangular brick building. It has a gambrel roof with overhanging eaves. The mill operated into the 1930s. The mill was restored by the Lake County Parks and Recreation Department in 1976.

It was listed in the National Register of Historic Places in 1975.
