= Merrillville Community School Corporation =

School district in Indiana

Merrillville Community School Corporation is a school district headquartered in Merrillville, Indiana, United States.

The district serves Ross Township which includes the entire town of Merrillville, the city of Crown Point north of 101st Ave, and the city of Hobart, south of 61st Ave.

== Merrillville Schools ==
=== Secondary schools ===
- Merrillville High School
- Clifford Pierce Middle School (Merrillville)

=== Primary schools ===
- 5–6
  - Merrillville Intermediate School (Merrillville)
- K–4
  - Henry P. Fieler Elementary School (Merrillville)
  - Homer Iddings Elementary School (Merrillville)
  - Edgar L. Miller Elementary School (Merrillville)
  - Jonas E. Salk Elementary School (Merrillville)
  - John Wood Elementary School (Hobart)

=== Other ===
- Adult and Community Education (Merrillville)
