= Maureen Mahoney =

American lawyer

Maureen E. Mahoney
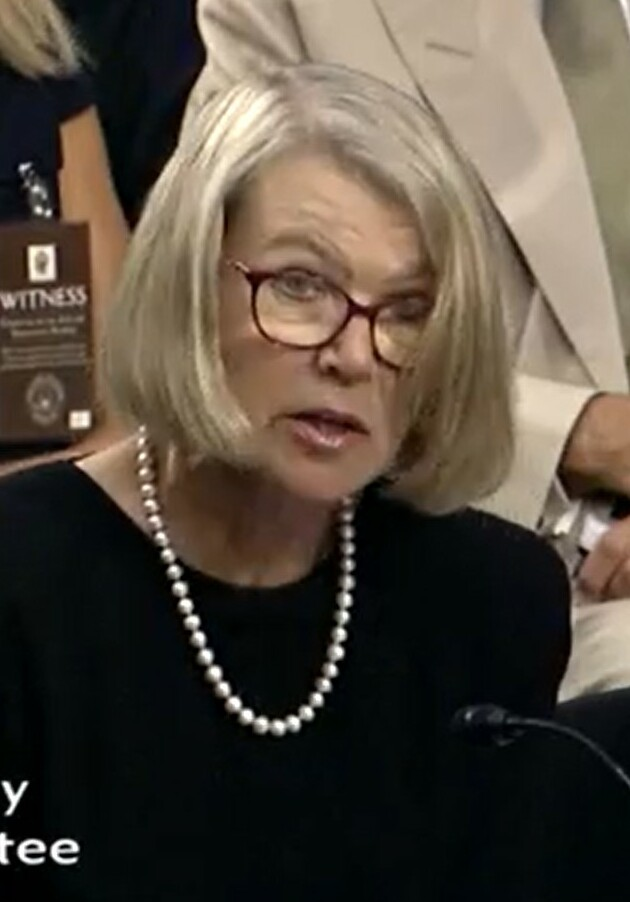
- Mahoney in 2018
- Born: August 28, 1954 (age 72); South Bend, Indiana, U.S.
- Education: Indiana University Bloomington (BA); University of Chicago (JD)
- Occupation: Lawyer
- Spouse: William H. Crispin

Maureen E. Mahoney (born August 28, 1954) is a former deputy solicitor general and an appellate lawyer at the law firm of Latham & Watkins in Washington, D.C., who has argued cases before the Supreme Court of the United States. Notably, she argued on behalf of the University of Michigan and its affirmative action program in Grutter v. Bollinger (2003), in which the Court decided in favor of Michigan by a 5–4 vote.

== Early life and education ==
Mahoney was born in South Bend, Indiana, while her father Martin was attending the University of Notre Dame Law School. The family moved to Merrillville, Indiana in 1961, when she was in first grade. Mahoney announced at age eight that she wanted to be a lawyer just like her father, who was a personal injury attorney.

In 1972, Mahoney graduated from Merrillville High School, where she was on the school's swim team. Mahoney earned her undergraduate degree in political science from Indiana University Bloomington in 1975 with Phi Beta Kappa honors, and her J.D. degree in 1978 from the University of Chicago Law School, where she served on the school's law review and was a member of Order of the Coif.

Mahoney was a clerk for Judge Robert Sprecher of the United States Court of Appeals for the Seventh Circuit before clerking for then-Associate Justice William Rehnquist during the 1979–1980 Term.

== Professional career ==
Mahoney joined Latham & Watkins in 1980 and remained at the firm for the next 11 years. She then served as Deputy Solicitor General in the George H. W. Bush administration, where she was a colleague of future Chief Justice of the United States John G. Roberts. In April 1992, President George H. W. Bush nominated her to serve as a judge of the United States District Court for the Eastern District of Virginia, but her nomination was not acted upon by the Senate before Bush's presidency ended. "It was definitely the low point of my career," she has said. "I never had a hearing, and there was never any opposition that I knew of, so it wasn't ugly. It was just disappointing."

In 1993, Mahoney rejoined Latham & Watkins.

In 2003, Mahoney represented accounting firm Arthur Anderson on appeal. In 2007, she was Joseph Nacchio's lead defense attorney in the proceedings surrounding his alleged insider trading.

Mahoney is a fellow of the American Academy of Arts and Sciences. She was appointed to the governing committee of the Supreme Court Historical Society, and prior to 2012 served on the Advisory Committee on Appellate Rules to the Judicial Conference of the United States.

== Supreme Court speculation ==
Harriet Miers' withdrawal of her Supreme Court nomination made Mahoney a possible candidate for the Supreme Court in 2005. However, her position in the University of Michigan affirmative action cases raised concerns among conservatives, and she ultimately was passed over in favor of Samuel Alito. "I already have a dream job, but it's extremely flattering to be considered," she told the Times of Northwest Indiana.

Mahoney was also mentioned as a possible Supreme Court nominee in a John McCain presidency.

== Politics ==
Mahoney supported former New York Mayor Rudy Giuliani in the 2008 presidential election. In the 2012 presidential election, Mahoney supported Mitt Romney.

== Personal ==
Mahoney is married to Washington, D.C. lawyer William H. Crispin. They live in Alexandria, Virginia and also have a vacation home on Nantucket, Massachusetts. They have two children, Brad and Abigail.

Mahoney also is known for her ritual of eating a donut before each oral argument. "When I swam as a kid, my coach told me I needed sugar in me if I wanted to compete," Mahoney has explained.

== See also ==
- List of law clerks for the ninth seat of the Supreme Court of the United States
- George W. Bush Supreme Court candidates
