= Crown Point High School =

School in Crown Point, Indiana, United States

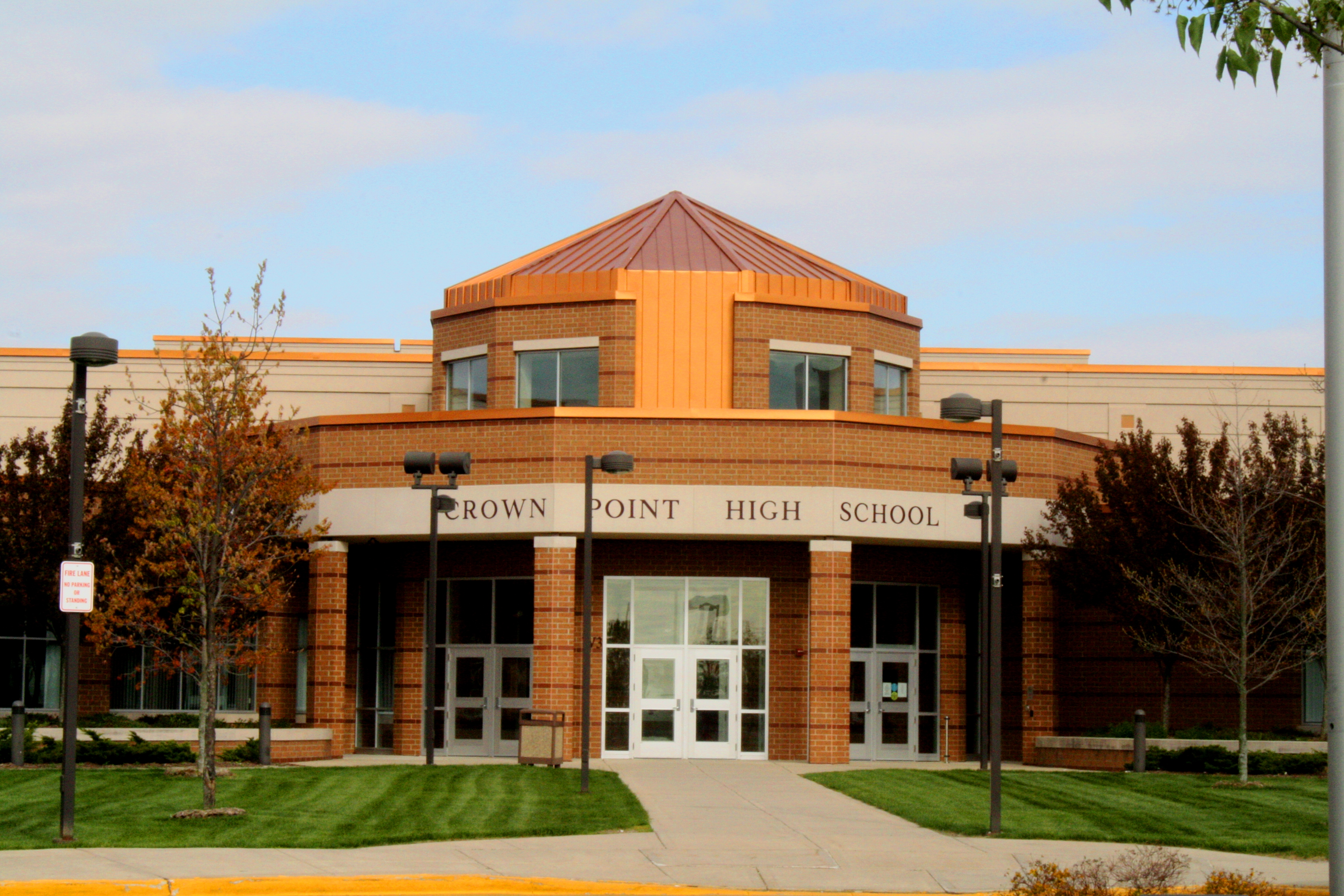

Location
- 1500 S Main Street; Crown Point, Lake County, Indiana 46307; United States; 41°23′23″N 87°21′38″W

Information
- Type: Public high school
- School district: Crown Point Community School Corporation
- Superintendent: Todd Terrill
- Principal: Russ Marcinek
- Teaching staff: 143.77 (on a FTE basis)
- Grades: 9-12
- Gender: Co-educational
- Enrollment: 2,998 (2023-2024)
- Student to teacher ratio: 20.85
- Colors: Red and white
- Athletics conference: Duneland Athletic Conference
- Team name: Bulldogs
- Rivals: Biggest: Merrillville High School; Lake Central High School; Others: Portage High School; Chesterton High School; Lowell High School; Valparaiso High School
- Accreditation: AdvancED
- Newspaper: Inklings
- Feeder schools: Taft Middle School; John Wheeler Middle School
- Website: cphs.cps.k12.in.us
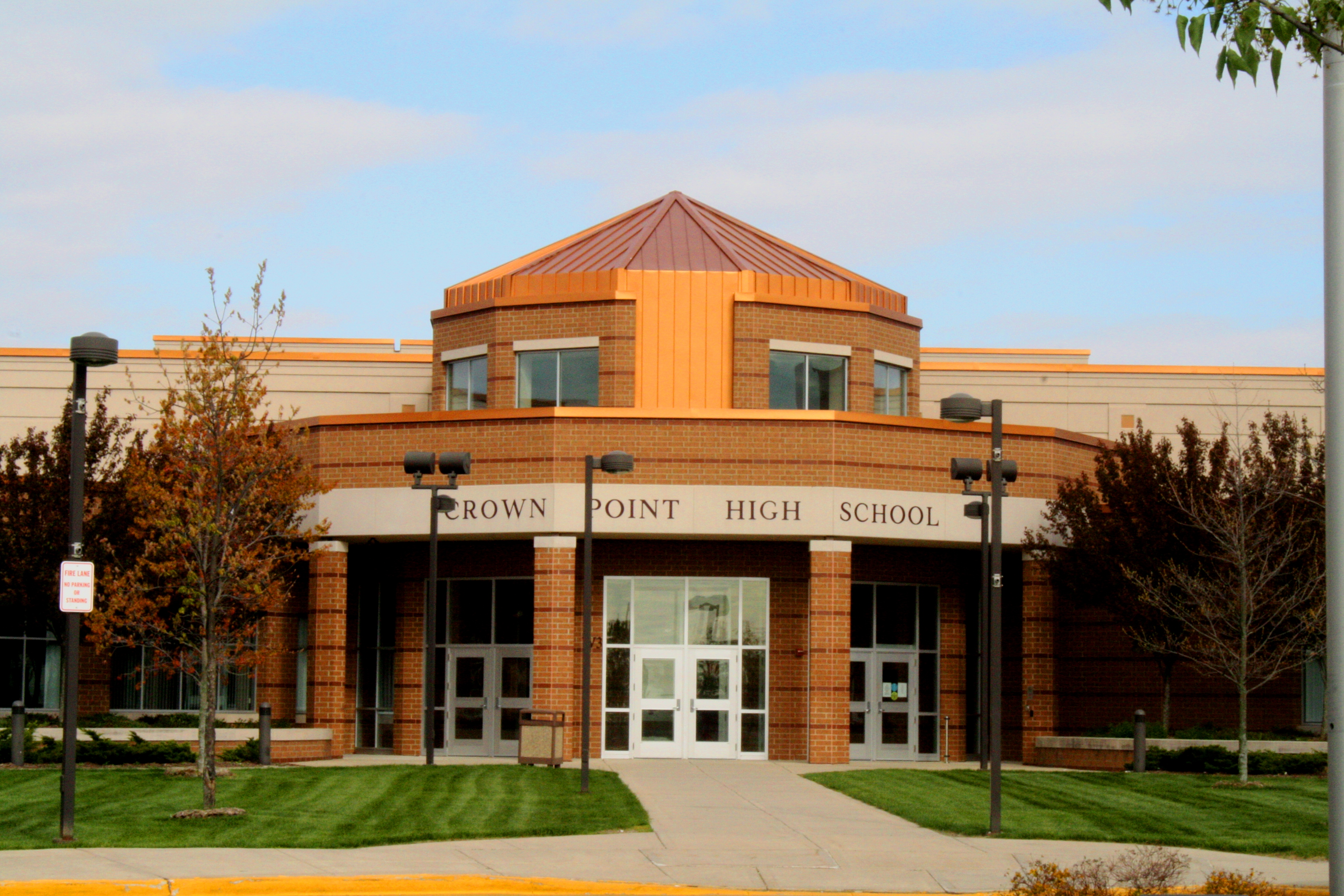

Crown Point High School (CPHS) is a public high school (grades 9–12) located in Crown Point, Indiana. It is the only high school in the Crown Point Community School Corporation.

== Academics ==
CPHS is accredited by AdvancED. For the 2023–24 school year, Crown Point was ranked 2,054 nationally and 32 in Indiana in U.S. News & World Report's annual school rankings.

== Demographics ==
The demographic breakdown of the 2,798 students enrolled in the 2021–2022 school year was as follows:

- Male - 52%
- Female - 48%
- Native American - 0.2%
- Asian/Pacific islander - 0%
- Black - 4.7%
- Hispanic - 15.8%
- White - 72.7%
- Multiracial - 3.16%

18% of students were eligible for free or reduced cost lunch.

== Athletics ==
The Crown Point Bulldogs compete in the Duneland Athletic Conference. The school colors are red and white. The following IHSAA sanctioned sports are offered:

- American football (boys')
- Baseball (boys')
- Basketball (boys' and girls')
  - Girls state champions - 1984, 1985, 2021 (4A)
- Cross country (boys' and girls')
- Golf (boys' and girls')
- Gymnastics (girls')
  - State champions - 2022, 2024
- Lacrosse (boys’ and girls’)
- Soccer (boys' and girls')
  - Boys state champions - 2012 (2A), 2014 (2A)
- Softball (girls')
  - State champions - 2017 (4A), 2025 (4A)
- Swimming (boys' and girls')
- Tennis (boys' and girls')
  - Boys state champions - 1972
- Track (boys' and girls')
- Volleyball (boys and girls')
- Wrestling (boys')
  - State champions - 2009, 2022, 2023

== Notable alumni ==
- Spike Albrecht - former player for the Michigan Wolverines men's basketball and Purdue Boilermakers men's basketball teams
- Karsen Henderlong - professional soccer player
- Tre Manchester - film producer and director
- Dan Plesac - former professional baseball player, baseball analyst on MLB Network
- Zach Plesac - pitcher for the Cleveland Guardians
- Jerry L. Ross - astronaut
- Geoffrey G. Slaughter - Indiana Supreme Court justice
- Sasha Stefanovic - former Purdue Boilermakers men's basketball guard

== See also ==
- List of high schools in Indiana
