= Brandon Jordan (gridiron football) =

American football player (born 1988)

No. 91, 92
- Position: Defensive tackle

Personal information
- Born: September 17, 1988 (age 38); Houston, Texas, U.S.
- Listed height: 6 ft 5 in (1.96 m)
- Listed weight: 255 lb (116 kg)

Career information
- High school: Merrillville (Merrillville, Indiana)
- College: Illinois (2006–2010)
- NFL draft: 2011: undrafted

Career history
- Wichita Wild (2011); Chicago Slaughter (2012); BC Lions (2012–2014); Calgary Stampeders (2014)

Awards and highlights
- Grey Cup champion (2014)

Brandon Alexander Stallworth Jordan (born September 17, 1988) is an American former professional football defensive tackle who played for the BC Lions and Calgary Stampeders of the Canadian Football League (CFL). He played college football at the University of Illinois at Urbana–Champaign. He was also a member of the Wichita Wild and Chicago Slaughter of the Indoor Football League (IFL).

== Early life ==
Brandon Alexander Stallworth Jordan was born on September 17, 1988, in Houston, Texas. He played high school football at Merrillville High School in Merrillville, Indiana as an offensive lineman and defensive lineman. He started playing football when he was 16. He recorded 27 pancake blocks his junior year and 43 pancake blocks his senior year. He played in three games on defense his senior season, posting eight solo tackles and three assisted tackles. Jordan earned Associated Press first-team Class 5A All-State honors.

== College career ==
Jordan was a member of the Illinois Fighting Illini from 2006 to 2010 as an offensive lineman. He was redshirted in 2006. He appeared in two games in 2007. He majored in communications at Illinois.

== Professional career ==
Jordan played in seven games for the Wichita Wild of the Indoor Football League (IFL) in 2011, accumulating six solo tackles, six assisted tackles, and 2.5 sacks.

He signed with the Chicago Slaughter of the IFL on February 17, 2012.

Jordan was signed by the BC Lions of the Canadian Football League (CFL) on May 29, 2012. He was released during final cuts prior to the start of the 2012 CFL season. He was later signed to the team's practice roster on August 13, 2012, and was promoted to the active roster on October 5, 2012. Jordan then dressed in four games, starting two, for the Lions during the 2012 season, totaling seven defensive tackles and two sacks. He dressed in 12 games, starting nine, in 2013, recording 15 defensive tackles, four special teams tackles, and four sacks. He dressed in two games for the Lions in 2014, posting one defensive tackle, before being released.

Jordan then signed with the Calgary Stampeders of the CFL on September 30, 2014. He dressed in four games for the Stampeders during the 2014 season, recording eight defensive tackles, one sack, and one fumble recovery. On November 30, 2014, the Stampeders beat the Hamilton Tiger-Cats in the 102nd Grey Cup by a score of 20–16. Jordan was released on May 5, 2015.
