= Duneland School Corporation =

School district in Indiana

Address
- 601 West Morgan Avenue Chesterton, Indiana; United States

District information
- Type: Public
- Grades: K-12
- Established: January 1, 1969; 56 years ago
- Superintendent: Dr. Chip Pettit

Other information
- Website: www.duneland.k12.in.us

The Duneland School Corporation is the school system that serves Jackson Township, Liberty Township, part of Pine Township, and Westchester Township, Porter County, Indiana, United States. Westchester Township has numerous small towns, including Chesterton, Porter, Dune Acres, and Burns Harbor. The corporation had 5,874 students in 9 schools as of the 2018–19 school year.

== Schools ==
High Schools (9–12)

- Chesterton High School

Middle Schools (7–8)

- Chesterton Middle school (Permanently closed in 2024)
- Liberty Middle school
- Westchester Middle school

Intermediate Schools (5–6)

- Liberty Intermediate School
- Westchester Intermediate School

Elementary Schools (K–4)

- Bailly Elementary School
- Brummitt Elementary School
- Jackson Elementary School
- Liberty Elementary School
- Yost Elementary School
