= Mike Neal =

American football player (born 1987)

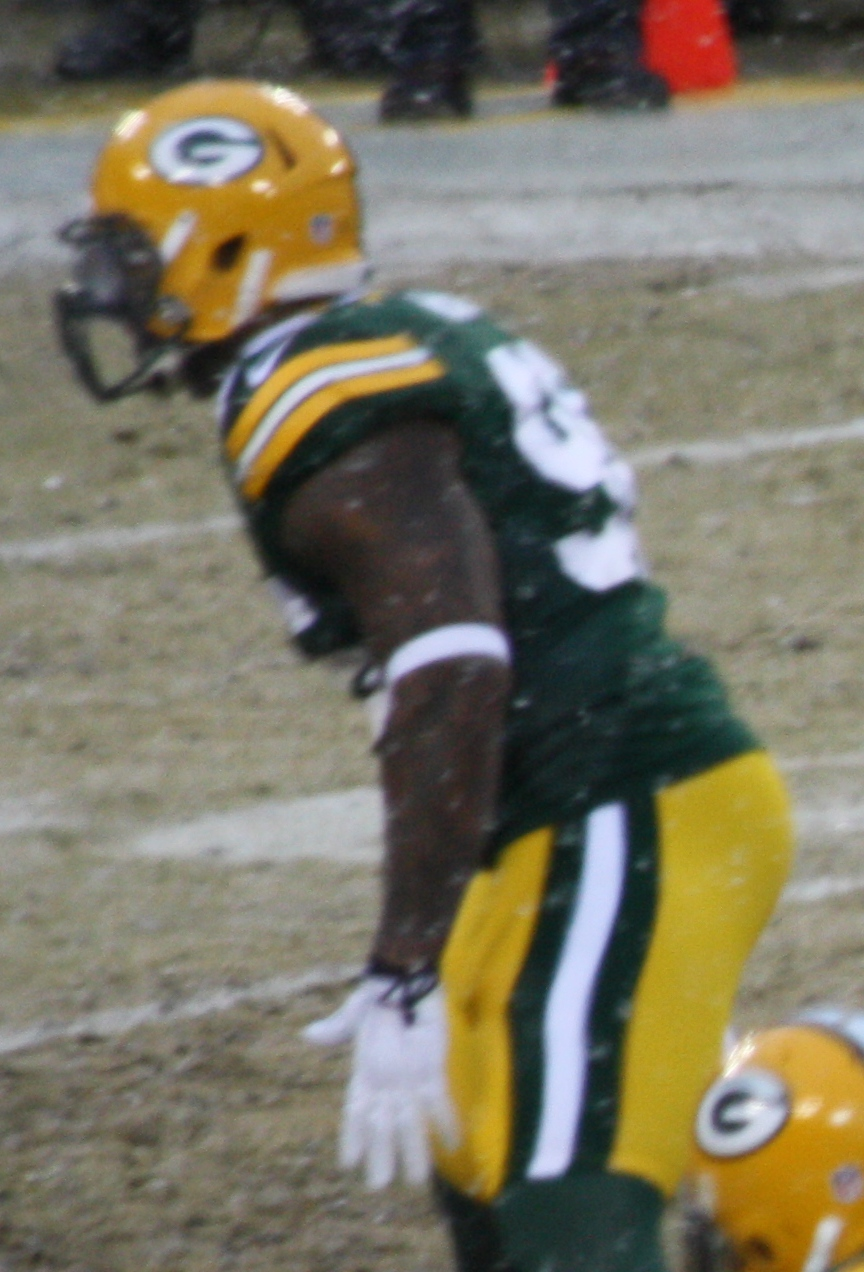
- Neal with the Green Bay Packers in 2013

No. 96
- Position: Linebacker

Personal information
- Born: June 26, 1987 (age 39); Gary, Indiana, U.S.
- Listed height: 6 ft 3 in (1.91 m)
- Listed weight: 262 lb (119 kg)

Career information
- High school: Merrillville (Merrillville, Indiana)
- College: Purdue
- NFL draft: 2010: 2nd round, 56th overall pick

Career history
- Green Bay Packers (2010–2015)

Awards and highlights
- Super Bowl champion (XLV)

Career NFL statistics
- Total tackles: 133
- Sacks: 19
- Forced fumbles: 3
- Pass deflections: 1
- Interceptions: 1
- Stats at Pro Football Reference

Michael Jamel Neal (born June 26, 1987) is an American former professional football player who was a linebacker who played for the Green Bay Packers of the National Football League (NFL). He played college football for the Purdue Boilermakers. Neal was selected by the Green Bay Packers in the second round of the 2010 NFL draft. With Green Bay, he won Super Bowl XLV in Arlington, Texas over the Pittsburgh Steelers.

== Early life ==
A native of Merrillville, Indiana, he attended Merrillville High School where he was first-team all-state as senior after totaling 59 tackles, including 24 for loss and 12 sacks, with 20 quarterback hurries, six pass breakups and one blocked kick. As a junior, had 49 tackles, including 14 for loss and four sacks, with three pass breakups and one fumble recovery.

Considered a three-star recruit by Rivals.com, he was rated as the 29th best strongside defensive end prospect of his class.

== College career ==
Neal attended Purdue University from 2005 to 2009. After redshirting his 2005 freshman year, he appeared in nine games as a sophomore, he had nine tackles, including 1.0 for loss, and one pass breakup despite missing five games with turf toe injury. In 2007, he appeared in all 13 games, and recorded 22 tackles, including 3.5 for loss and 2.0 sacks, with one pass breakup. In 2008, he appeared in all 12 games, including 11 starts. He ranked second on team with 5.5 sacks and third with 10.0 tackles for loss, while adding 33 total tackles. As a redshirt senior, he started all 12 games, finishing third on the team in tackles for loss with 11.5 and second in sack with 5.0, while forcing one fumble.

== Professional career ==
External videos
- Neal's NFL Combine workout

Pre-draft measurables
Height	Weight	Arm length	Hand span	40-yard dash	10-yard split	20-yard split	20-yard shuttle	Three-cone drill	Vertical jump	Broad jump	Bench press	Wonderlic
6 ft 3 in (1.91 m)	294 lb (133 kg)	33 1/2	10 1/4	4.95 s	1.70 s	2.84 s	4.53 s	7.53 s	33 in (0.84 m)	9 ft 5 in (2.87 m)	31 reps	20
All values are from NFL Combine

Neal was selected in the second round (56th overall) by the Green Bay Packers in the 2010 NFL draft. Neal played two games during his rookie season in 2010, recording a sack, forced fumble 3 tackles. In 2011, he gained more playing time, seeing time in seven games. Neal played 11 games with 1 start, making 11 tackles with 4.5 sacks in 2012. On March 12, 2013, he re-signed with the Packers on a two-year deal. In 2013, Neal played all 16 games for the first time of his career, totalling 47 tackles, 5 sacks, an interception, and a forced fumble. He played all 16 games, recording 33 tackles with 4.5 sacks in 2014. In 2015, Neal played all 16 games for the third straight year, producing 36 tackles and 4 sacks. He had an impressive performance in the NFC wild card game against the Washington Redskins, where he sacked quarterback Kirk Cousins twice while also forcing a fumble.

=== Statistics ===
The following statistics were retrieved from NFL.com.

Year	Team	G	GS	Tackles					Interceptions						Fumbles	
Year	Team	G	GS	Total	Solo	Ast	Sck	SFTY	PDef	Int	Yds	Avg	Lng	TDs	FF	FR
Regular season
2010	GB	2	0	3	3	0	1.0	0	0	0	0	0	0	0	1	0
2011	GB	7	0	3	1	2	0.0	0	0	0	0	0	0	0	0	0
2012	GB	11	1	11	8	3	4.5	0	0	0	0	0	0	0	0	0
2013	GB	16	10	47	36	11	5.0	0	1	1	5	5	5	0	1	0
2014	GB	16	3	33	20	13	4.5	0	0	0	0	0	0	0	0	0
2015	GB	16	15	36	24	12	4.0	0	0	0	0	0	0	0	1	0
Total		68	29	133	92	41	19.0	0	1	1	5	5	5	0	3	0
Postseason
2011	GB	1	0	1	1	0	0.0	0	0	0	0	0	0	0	0	0
2012	GB	2	0	1	0	1	0.0	0	0	0	0	0	0	0	0	0
2013	GB	1	1	1	1	0	0.0	0	0	0	0	0	0	0	0	0
2014	GB	2	0	8	4	4	0.5	0	0	0	0	0	0	0	0	0
2015	GB	2	2	3	3	0	2.0	0	0	0	0	0	0	0	1	1
Total		8	3	14	9	5	2.5	0	0	0	0	0	0	0	1	1
