= Tom Jelesky =

American football player (born 1960)

No. 77
- Position: Offensive tackle

Personal information
- Born: October 4, 1960 (age 66); Merrillville, Indiana, U.S.
- Listed height: 6 ft 6 in (1.98 m)
- Listed weight: 275 lb (125 kg)

Career information
- High school: Merrillville
- College: Purdue
- NFL draft: 1983: undrafted

Career history
- Philadelphia Eagles (1983)*; Denver Gold (1984)*; Philadelphia Eagles (1985-1986)
- * Offseason or practice squad member only

Awards and highlights
- Second-team All-Big Ten (1981)
- Stats at Pro Football Reference

Thomas John Jelesky (born October 4, 1960) is an American former professional football player who was an offensive tackle for two seasons with the Philadelphia Eagles of the National Football League (NFL). He played in 1985 and in 1986, and appeared in every game during the former.

In 2010, Jelesky was inducted into the Merrillville High School Athletics Hall of Fame.
