= Kouts Middle-High School =

Kouts School

Location
- 302 East College Avenue; Kouts, Porter County, Indiana 46347; United States
- 41.314595°N 87.022870°W

Information
- Type: Public school
- School district: East Porter County School Corporation
- Principal: Tom Stoner
- Teaching staff: 27.50 (FTE)
- Grades: K-12
- Enrollment: 381 (2024–2025)
- Student to teacher ratio: 13.85
- Colors: Black and gold
- Athletics conference: Porter County Conference
- Team name: Mustangs/Fillies
- Website: Official Website

Kouts School is a public K-12 school located in Kouts, Indiana.

== Athletics ==
The school's colors are black and gold. Athletic teams participate in the Porter County Conference (PCC). The following sports programs are offered at Kouts:

=== Girls' sports ===
- Soccer
- Volleyball
- Golf
- Basketball
- Softball
- Cross Country
- Cheerleading
- Tennis

=== Boys' sports ===
- Baseball
- Basketball
- Track
- Cross country
- Golf
- Soccer
- Volleyball

=== State championships ===
- Baseball - 2026

== See also ==
- List of high schools in Indiana
