= Lake Central School Corporation =

School district in Indiana

Location
- 8260 Wicker Avenue; St. John, Indiana United States
- Coordinates: 41.4677°N 87.4704°W

District information
- Type: Public school district
- Grades: PreK–12
- Established: 1967; 59 years ago
- Superintendent: Dr. Larry Veracco

Students and staff
- Enrollment: 9,633
- Faculty: 546

Other information
- Website: lcsc.us

Lake Central School Corporation is a public school district in St. John Township, Indiana.

Its students come from the towns of St. John (the majority), Dyer (north of 101st Ave), almost the entire town of Schererville, the southeastern section of Griffith that is within St. John Township, a small section of Crown Point, and unincorporated areas with Crown Point postal addresses (north of 101st Ave).

== Schools ==
Lake Central School Corporation operates several schools in St. John Township, Indiana.

District Schools

Lake Central High School	8400 Wicker Avenue; St. John, IN 46373
Clark Middle School	8915 West 93rd Avenue; St. John, IN 46373
Grimmer Middle School	225 West 77th Avenue; Schererville, IN 46375
Kahler Middle School	600 Joliet Street; Dyer, IN 46311
Bibich Elementary School	14600 W 81st Avenue; Dyer, IN 46311
Homan Elementary School	210 East Joliet Street; Schererville, IN 46375
Kolling Elementary School	8801 Wicker Avenue; St. John, IN 43673
Peifer Elementary School	1824 Cline Avenue; Schererville, IN 46375
Protsman Elementary School	1121 Harrison Avenue; Dyer, IN 46311
Watson Elementary School	333 West 77th Avenue; Schererville, IN 46375
West Lake Special Education Cooperative	212 East Joliet Street; Schererville, IN 46375

== Administration ==
Current Administration The corporation's administration office is located in the south part of Lake Central High School.

Position	Name
Superintendent	Dr. Larry Veracco
Assistant Superintendent	Al Gandolfi
Director of Primary Education	Theresa Schoon
Director of Secondary Education	Sarah Castaneda
Director of Special Education	Rebecca Gromala
Director of Business Services	Rob James
Director of Facilities	Bill Ledyard
Director of Technology	Rick Moreno
Director of Food Services	Gladys Rediger
Director of Transportation	Christian Flores

== School Board ==
Current School Board

Position	Name
President	Cindy Sues
Vice President	Dr. Janice Malchow
Secretary	Howard Marshall
Member	Dr. Jennifer Medlen
Member	Nicole Kelly
