= Boone Grove High School =

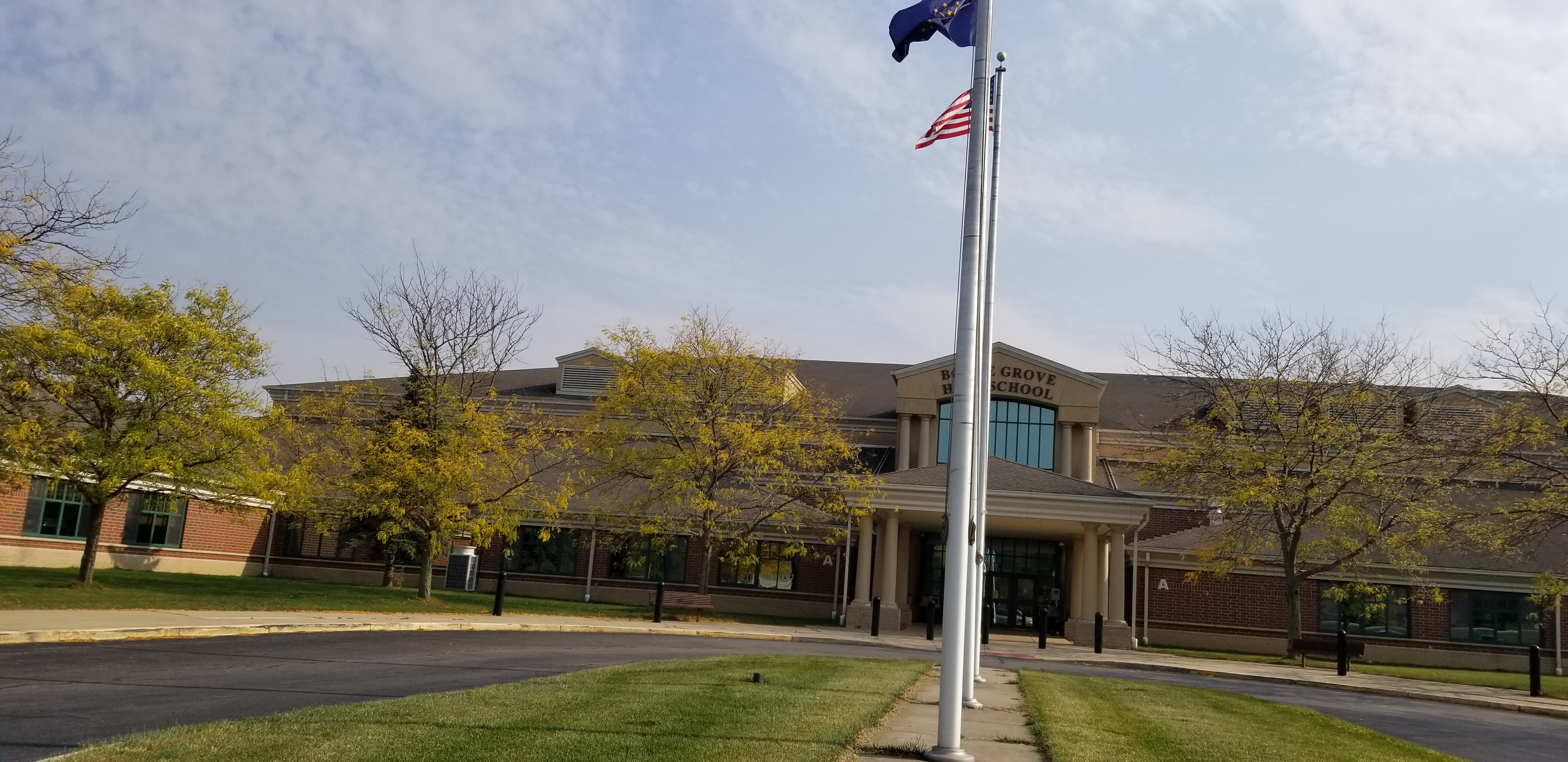

Location
- 260 South 500 West; Valparaiso, Indiana 46385; United States; 41.396296°N 87.165572°W

Information
- Type: Public high school
- Established: 1913
- School district: Porter Township School Corporation
- Superintendent: Stacey Schmidt
- Principal: Clay Corman
- Teaching staff: 36.00 (on an FTE basis)
- Grades: 9–12
- Enrollment: 467 (2024-2025)
- Student to teacher ratio: 12.97
- Colors: Blue and white
- Athletics conference: Porter County Conference
- Nickname: Wolves
- Rival: Wheeler Bearcats
- Website: bghs.ptsc.k12.in.us

Boone Grove High School is a public high school in Valparaiso, Indiana, United States. It is part of the Porter Township School Corporation.

Boone Grove High School includes grades 9–12. In 1913, the first 4-year commissioned high school was built in Boone Grove.

== Demographics ==
The demographic breakdown of the 503 students enrolled in the 2016–2017 was:

- Male – 51.1%
- Female – 48.9%
- Asian – 0.4%
- Black – 2.4%
- Hispanic – 12.9%
- White – 82.9%
- Multiracial – 1.4%

27.8% of the students were eligible for free or reduced-cost lunch.

== Athletics ==
The school's colors are royal blue and white. The mascot is the wolf. Athletic teams participate in the Porter County Conference (PCC). The following sports programs are offered at Boone Grove:

=== Girls' sports ===
- Soccer
- Volleyball
- Golf
- Gymnastics
- Basketball
- Softball
- Cross Country
- Cheerleading
- Tennis

=== Boys' sports ===
- Football
- Wrestling
- Baseball
- Basketball
- Track
- Cross country
- Golf
- Soccer
- Volleyball

== See also ==
- List of high schools in Indiana
