= Westville High School (Indiana) =

Location
- 207 East Valparaiso Street; Westville, Indiana 46391; United States
- Coordinates: 41.541649°N 86.894305°W

Information
- Type: Public high school
- School district: MSD of New Durham Township
- Superintendent: Brian Ton
- Principal: Alysa Schnick
- Faculty: 29.00(FTE)
- Grades: 7-12
- Enrollment: 427 (2023-24)
- Student to teacher ratio: 14.72
- Color
- Athletics conference: Porter County Conference
- Team name: Blackhawks
- Website: Official Website

Westville High School is a public high school located in Westville, Indiana.

== See also ==
- List of high schools in Indiana
