= Merrillville High School =

Location
- 276 East 68th Place; Merrillville, Indiana 46410; United States; 41°29′41″N 87°19′51″W

Information
- Type: Coeducational public high school
- School district: Merrillville Community School Corporation
- Principal: Michael Krutz
- Teaching staff: 127.00 (FTE)
- Grades: 9-12
- Enrollment: 2,051 (2023–2024)
- Student to teacher ratio: 16.15
- Colors: Purple, black, and white
- Athletics conference: Duneland Athletic Conference
- Nickname: Pirates
- Rivals: Andrean High School; Hobart High School; Lake Central High School; Crown Point High School; Warsaw Community High School
- Accreditation: North Central Association of Colleges and Schools
- Newspaper: The Mirror
- Feeder schools: Clifford Pierce Middle School
- Website: mhs.mvsc.k12.in.us

Merrillville High School (MHS) is a public high school in Merrillville, Indiana, for students in grades nine through 12.

== About ==
Merrillville High School is the only high school in the Merrillville Community School Corporation. In the 2009–10 school year, it added a Freshman Center Wing to its northeast corner. As of 2025, another cafeteria was being added to the school.

== Demographics ==
The demographics of the 2,182 students enrolled in school year 2019–20 were as follows:

- Male - 50%
- Female - 50%
- Native American - 0.1%
- Asian/Pacific islander - 1.1%
- Black - 66%
- Hispanic - 18%
- White - 10%
- Multiracial - 5%

== Athletics ==
The Merrillville Pirates compete in the Duneland Athletic Conference. The school colors are purple, black and white. The following IHSAA-sanctioned sports are offered:

- Baseball (boys')
- Basketball (boys' & girls')
- Cross country (boys' & girls')
- Football (boys')
  - State champion - 1976
- Golf (boys' & girls')
- Gymnastics (girls')
  - State champion - 1986, 1992
- Soccer (boys' & girls')
- Softball (girls')
  - State champion - 1993, 1997
- Swimming (boys' & girls')
- Tennis (boys' & girls')
- Track (boys' & girls')
- Unified Track (coed)
- Volleyball (boys' & girls')
- Wrestling (boys' & girls')

== Notable alumni ==
- David Bedella - Actor / Entertainer
- Kenneth Grant - NFL defensive tackle for the Miami Dolphins
- Tom Jelesky - former NFL offensive tackle
- Brandon Jordan - former CFL defensive lineman for Calgary Stampede
- Maureen Mahoney - former deputy solicitor general
- Josh Mayo - former professional basketball player
- Mike Neal - former NFL linebacker for the Green Bay Packers
- Ryan Neal - NFL strong safety for the Tampa Bay Buccaneers
- David Neville - Olympic medalist
- Gregg Popovich - NBA head coach for the San Antonio Spurs
- Lou Stefanovic - former professional basketball player
- Todd Wagner - entrepreneur
- Jamel Williams - former NFL safety for the Washington Redskins
- Eugene Wilson - former NFL safety for the Houston Texans, Tampa Bay Buccaneers and the New England Patriots

== See also ==
- List of high schools in Indiana
