= Lake Central High School =

Location
- 8400 Wicker Avenue (High School); 8410 Wicker Avenue (Freshmen Center); St. John, Indiana 46373; United States; 41°28′1″N 87°28′19″W

Information
- Type: Public high school
- Established: 1967
- School district: Lake Central School Corporation
- Superintendent: Larry Veracco
- Principal: Erin Novak
- Teaching staff: 144.50 (on an FTE basis)
- Grades: 9–12
- Enrollment: 2,929 (2024–2025)
- Student to teacher ratio: 20.25:1
- Colors: Blue and white
- Fight song: "Fighting Indians"
- Athletics conference: Duneland Athletic Conference
- Nickname: Indians
- Rivals: Crown Point High School; Munster High School; Merrillville High School
- Newspaper: Comet
- Yearbook: Echo
- Communities served: Dyer; Schererville; St. John
- Feeder schools: Clark Middle School; Grimmer Middle School; Kahler Middle School
- Website: lake-central.lcsc.us

Lake Central High School (LCHS) is a high school in St. John, Indiana, for students in grades nine through twelve. Its students come from St. John Township which includes the towns of St. John and Dyer (generally north of 101st Ave), almost the entire town of Schererville, unincorporated areas with Crown Point postal addresses (north of 101st Ave), and the southeastern section of Griffith that is within St. John Township. It is the only high school in the Lake Central School Corporation.

== History ==
The school opened in 1967. It includes an attached freshmen wing (Freshmen Center) which opened in 1994. The current high school succeeded Dyer Central High School. The Dyer Central Building became the building for Kahler Middle School which is still part of the Lake Central School Corporation. The Dyer Central building was demolished in 1993–94 as part of renovations made to Kahler Middle school.

Between 1967 and 1983, a television station, WCAE (channel 50), operated from the Lake Central High School campus.

Some Lake Central students and faculty were the subject of an October 20, 2012, Wall Street Journal front-page article on their collective work to track down and document Indiana's battle casualties. A similar story appeared during the CBS Evening News in 2013 showing teacher and students working on their Hero Project.

Lake Central made the news again in 2017 when teacher Samantha Cox was videotaped using cocaine in her classroom by a student. Cox later pleaded guilty to the incident in 2018.

== Academics ==
In the 2025-2026 U.S. News & World Report annual ranking of secondary schools, Lake Central was ranked 1,705th nationally and 27th in Indiana.

== Demographics ==
The demographic breakdown of the 2,926 students that were enrolled for the 2024–2025 school year was:

- Native American/Alaskan – 0.2%
- Asian – 3.0%
- Black – 8.3%
- Hispanic – 20.8%
- White – 64.1%
- Multiracial – 3.6%

22.3% of students qualified for free or reduced-cost lunch. For 2024–2025, Lake Central was a Title I school.

== Renovations ==
Lake Central High School underwent many renovations from 2011 to 2016. In November 2011, voters of the Tri-Town community passed a building referendum to renovate and rebuild the school. The referendum, in which Lake Central and the district's Protsman Elementary School were renovated and rebuilt, was for $160,000,000. All academic areas of the school were rebuilt or improved, followed by fine arts and many new athletic facilities to help bring the school up to modern standards. This renovation was the first major and most recent renovation to the school, which opened its doors in 1967.

== Athletics ==
Lake Central is a member of the Indiana High School Athletic Association (IHSAA) and the Duneland Athletic Conference (DAC), and offers its students twenty-four different school-sanctioned sports. The nickname for Lake Central's athletic teams is the "Indians."

=== Fall Sports ===
- Boys' Cross Country
- Girls' Cross Country
- Football
- Girls' Flag Football
- Girls' Golf
- Boys' Soccer
- Girls' Soccer
- Boys' Tennis
- Girls' Volleyball

=== Winter Sports ===
- Boys' Basketball
- Girls' Basketball
- Girls' Gymnastics
- Co-ed' Hockey
- Boys' Swimming
- Girls' Swimming
- Boys' Wrestling
- Girls' Wrestling
- Bowling
- Girls' Dance Team

=== Spring Sports ===
- Baseball
- Boys' Golf
- Girls' Lacrosse
- Softball
- Boys' Track and Field
- Girls' Track and Field
- Girls' Tennis
- Boys' Volleyball

=== IHSAA State Championships (11) ===
- 1987 Boys' Swimming
- 1992 Softball
- 1994 Girls' Basketball
- 2002 Softball (3A)
- 2004 Softball (4A)
- 2010 Boys' Soccer
- 2012 Baseball (4A)
- 2024 Baseball (4A)
- 2026 Softball (4A)
- 2026 Baseball (4A)
- 2026 Girls' Cross Country

=== IHSAA State Runner-Up Titles (13) ===
- 1990 Boys' Swimming
- 1993 Football (5A)
- 1998 Girls' Basketball (4A)
- 1999 Boys' Swimming
- 2003 Softball (3A)
- 2007 Girls' Cross Country
- 2008 Girls' Cross Country
- 2014 Boys' Basketball (4A)
- 2015 Softball (4A)
- 2018 Softball (4A)
- 2019 Boys' Soccer (3A)
- 2021 Softball (4A)
- 2024 Girls' Basketball (4A)

== Notable people ==
=== Alumni ===
* Lazo Alavanja – Professional soccer player
- Eric Gehrig – Major League Soccer (MLS) defender
- Kelly Komara – 1998 Indiana Miss Basketball; assistant NCAA Women's Basketball coach
- Rob Mackowiak – Major League Baseball (MLB) utility player
- Bobby Pesavento – Arena Football League quarterback
- Glenn Robinson III – National Basketball Association (NBA) player
- Pete Seat – former spokesman for President George W. Bush; occasional contributor to CNN, Fox News, and MSNBC
- Jared Tomich – National Football League (NFL) player
- Tyler Wideman (born 1995) – Basketball player in the Israeli National League

=== Staff ===
- Al Pilarcik – MLB outfielder and faculty member at Lake Central

== See also ==
- List of high schools in Indiana
