= Portage High School =

Location
- 6450 US Highway 6 Portage, Indiana 46368; United States; 41°33′08″N 87°10′11″W

Information
- Type: Public secondary school
- Opened: 1932
- School district: Portage Township Schools
- Principal: Mike Stills
- Teaching staff: 123.33 (on an FTE basis)
- Grades: 9–12
- Enrollment: 3,009 (2025-2026)
- Student to teacher ratio: 17.54
- Color
- Song: Go U Northwestern
- Athletics conference: Duneland Athletic Conference
- Nickname: Indians
- Rival: Biggest: Crown Point High School; Others: Chesterton High School; Hobart High School
- Newspaper: The Chronicle
- Yearbook: Legend
- Feeder schools: Fegely Middle School; Willowcreek Middle School
- Website: phs.portage.k12.in.us

Portage High School is a public high school in Portage, Indiana that serves grades 9 through 12.

The school has been in the area since the 1960s but can be dated back to the 1940s. The school serves the Portage, Indiana area as well as the South Haven area of Valparaiso, Indiana and Ogden Dunes, Indiana. The principal is Mike Stills. The school offers a wide range of classes including Advanced Placement classes and dual credit enrollment classes.

== Athletics ==
Portage High School offers a wide range of athletics including:

- Football (State Champions, 1977 (3A))
- Soccer
- Baseball
- Basketball
- Track and field
- Cross country (State Champions: 1974, 1984, 1992, 1999)
- Volleyball
- Tennis
- Gymnastics (State Champions 1975, 2013)
- Golf
- Wrestling
- Cheerleading
- Swimming
- Softball (State Champions, 2000 (3A), 2013 (4A))
- Esports (State Champions Rocket League (3A), 2023 Spring, IEN)

All sports compete in the Duneland Athletic Conference (DAC).

== Demographics ==
The demographic breakdown of the 3,009 students enrolled in the 2025 - 2026 school year was as follows:

- Male - 49%
- Female - 51%
- Native American - 1.1%
- Asian/Pacific islander - 3.8%
- Black - 39.8%
- Hispanic - 19.7%
- White - 30.2%
- Multiracial - 6.4%

Portage ranks as #2 in Indiana in diversity.

== Publications ==
The Publications Department produces the student news website and newspaper (The Chronicle), as well as the student yearbook (Legend).

== Notable alumni ==
- Darren Elkins, mixed martial artist
- Albert Evans, former football safety
- Kurt Squire, professor of game design and education

== See also ==
- List of high schools in Indiana
