= Chesterton High School =

Location
- 2125 South 11th Street; Chesterton, Indiana 46304; United States; 41°35′18″N 87°03′54″W

Information
- Type: Public high school
- Established: 1922
- School district: Duneland School Corporation
- Principal: Martinson
- Teaching staff: 112.44 (on an FTE basis)
- Grades: 9–12
- Enrollment: 1,937 (2024–2025)
- Student to teacher ratio: 17.23
- Colors: Maroon and gold
- Athletics conference: Duneland Athletic Conference
- Nickname: Trojans
- Website: chs.duneland.k12.in.us

Chesterton High School is a public high school serving grades 9-12 located in Chesterton, Indiana. It is the only high school in the Duneland School Corporation.

== History ==
In 1833, Jesse Morgan, the area's first postmaster, opened the first educational institution for Duneland locals. That school sufficed the community until William Thomas II donated land and offered to help build a two-room schoolhouse in 1840. When the building was finally finished in 1852, there were some local complaints of "its rickety conditions." Twenty-five years later, in 1877, $6,000 was spent on creating Chesterton's first high school. Within only a few years, overcrowding became a problem, and the school received a four-room addition in 1890.

This building worked for some time, but complications such as a broken furnace, led to the school building being torn down in 1911. After some property disputes with a local church, it was replaced with a more spacious, two-story school. The community outgrew this school yet again, and in 1921 a school was created specifically for high-schoolers. The school was three stories tall and possessed an auditorium that could seat 750. After spending $175,000, Westchester Township High School opened on December 14, 1922, and was hailed by locals as a wonderful building.

== Academics ==
Chesterton offers fifteen Advanced Placement exams: Biology, US History, Literature and Composition, AP Calculus AB, AP Calculus BC, Chemistry, Stats, Computer Science, European History, AP United States History, Environmental Science, Physics, Physics B and Physics C.

Beginning in the 2009–2010 school year, Chesterton High School also began offering International Baccalaureate diplomas.

The high school also offers dual credit through Purdue Northwest and Ivy Tech Community College for select courses. Juniors and seniors also have the ability to take vocational classes through the Porter County Career and Technical Center.

== Demographics ==
The demographic breakdown of the 2,077 students enrolled for 2016-17 was:

- Male - 49.9%
- Female - 50.1%
- Native American/Alaskan - 0.1%
- Asian - 1.8%
- Black - 2.4%
- Hispanic - 9.1%
- White - 83.3%
- Multiracial - 3.3%

22.8% of the students were eligible for free or reduced-cost lunch.

== Athletics ==
The Chesterton Trojans compete in the Duneland Athletic Conference. The school colors are maroon and gold. The following Indiana High School Athletic Association (IHSAA) sanctioned sports are offered:

- Baseball (boys)
- Basketball (girls and boys)
- Cross country (girls and boys)
- Football (boys)
- Golf (boys and girls)
- Gymnastics (girls)
  - State championship - 1993, 2000, 2002, 2018, 2019
- Soccer (girls and boys)
  - Boys state championship - 2018, 2020
- Softball (girls)
- Swimming and Diving (girls and boys)
  - Boys state championship - 2008, 2009, 2012, 2013, *2014
- Tennis (girls and boys)
- Track and field (girls and boys)
- Unified track and field (coed)
- Volleyball (girls)
- Wrestling (boys)
  - State championship - 1989
- * = National Championship

== Arts ==
Chesterton High School offers a number of programs in the visual and performing arts.

=== Marching band ===
The Trojan Guard is the school's marching band. They won the Marching Bands of America Grand National Championships in 1981. The Trojan Guard has also won the Indiana marching band state championship in 2013 and 2015 Class A State Championship Title.

== WDSO ==
WDSO 88.3 is a radio station located at Chesterton High School, with its transmitter located at Chesterton Middle School. WDSO is a non-profit high school station. They air most Chesterton home football games with student commentators and some basketball and baseball. Students will also do bottom-of-the-hour news and weather updates with news stories given by Network Indiana.

WDSO celebrated their 50th anniversary in 2026.

== Notable alumni ==
- Bob Dille — professional basketball player
- Mitch McGary — professional basketball player
- Zack Novak — professional basketball player
- Matt Nover - Professional basketball player, co-starred in the movie Blue Chips.
- Blake Pieroni — Olympic swimmer
- Rodney Pol Jr. — politician
- Taylor Zakhar Perez — actor, known for Netflix's The Kissing Booth series

== See also ==
- List of high schools in Indiana
