= Merrillville, Indiana =

- Town
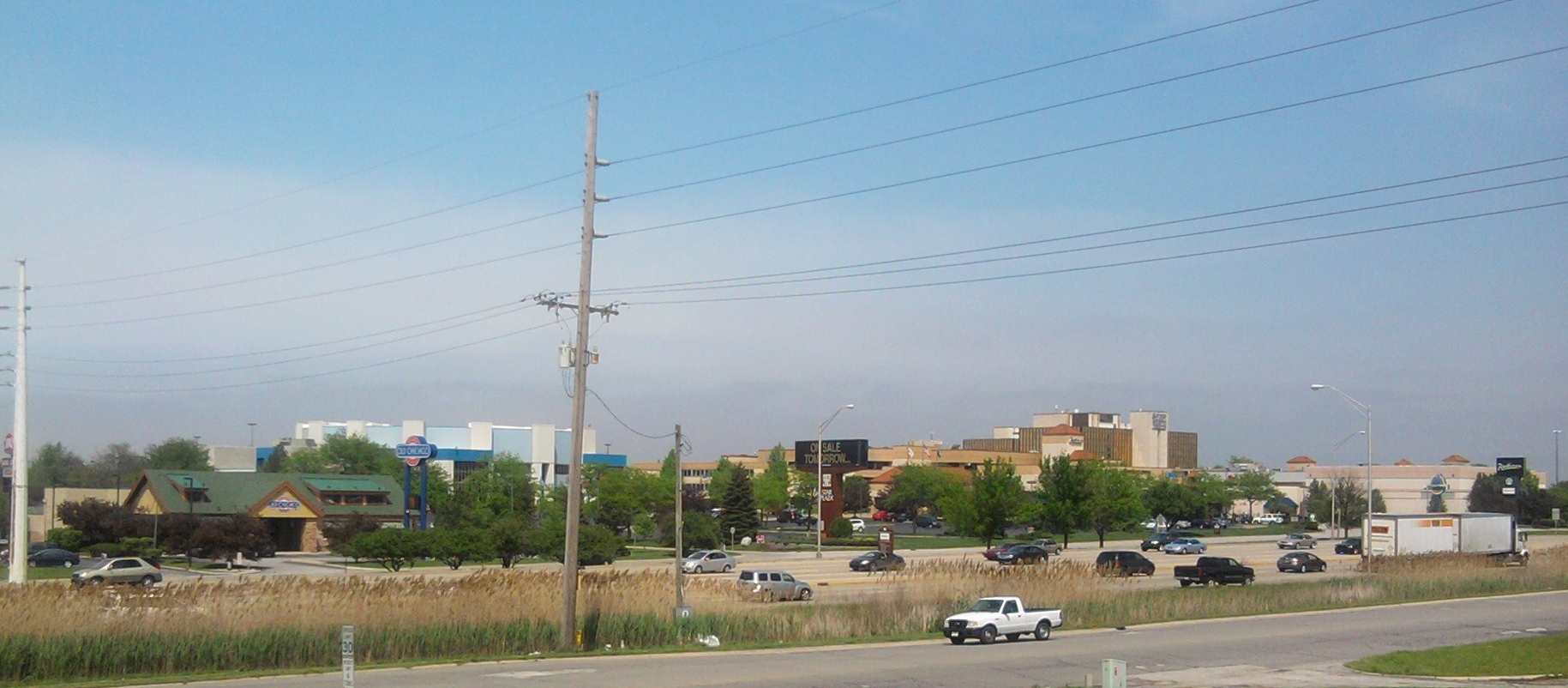
- Merrillville's skyline in May 2012

- Flag Seal

- Location of Merrillville in Lake County, Indiana.
- Coordinates: 41°29′08″N 87°20′07″W
- Country: United States
- State: Indiana
- County: Lake
- Township: Ross
- Established: 1834
- Incorporated: 1971

Government
  - Type: Town
  - Town Manager: Patrick J. Reardon

Area
  - Total: 33.29 sq mi (86.21 km^{2})
  - Land: 33.24 sq mi (86.08 km^{2})
  - Water: 0.046 sq mi (0.12 km^{2})
- Elevation: 679 ft (207 m)

Population (2020)
  - Total: 36,444
  - Density: 1,096.5/sq mi (423.36/km^{2})
- Time zone: UTC−6 (CST)
  - Summer (DST): UTC−5 (CDT)
- ZIP codes: 46410, 46411, 46342(Partial)
- Area code: 219
- FIPS code: 18-48528
- GNIS feature ID: 2396754
- Website: www.merrillville.in.gov

Merrillville (/ˈmɛrəlvɪl/ MAIR-əl-vil, locally /ˈmɛərvɪl/) is a town in Ross Township, Lake County, Indiana, United States. The population was 36,444 at the 2020 census. Merrillville is in east-central Lake County, in the Chicago metropolitan area. On January 1, 2015, Merrillville became the most populated town in Indiana, as Fishers in Hamilton County was converted from a town to a city. The town serves as a major shopping hub for Northwest Indiana.

== Geography ==
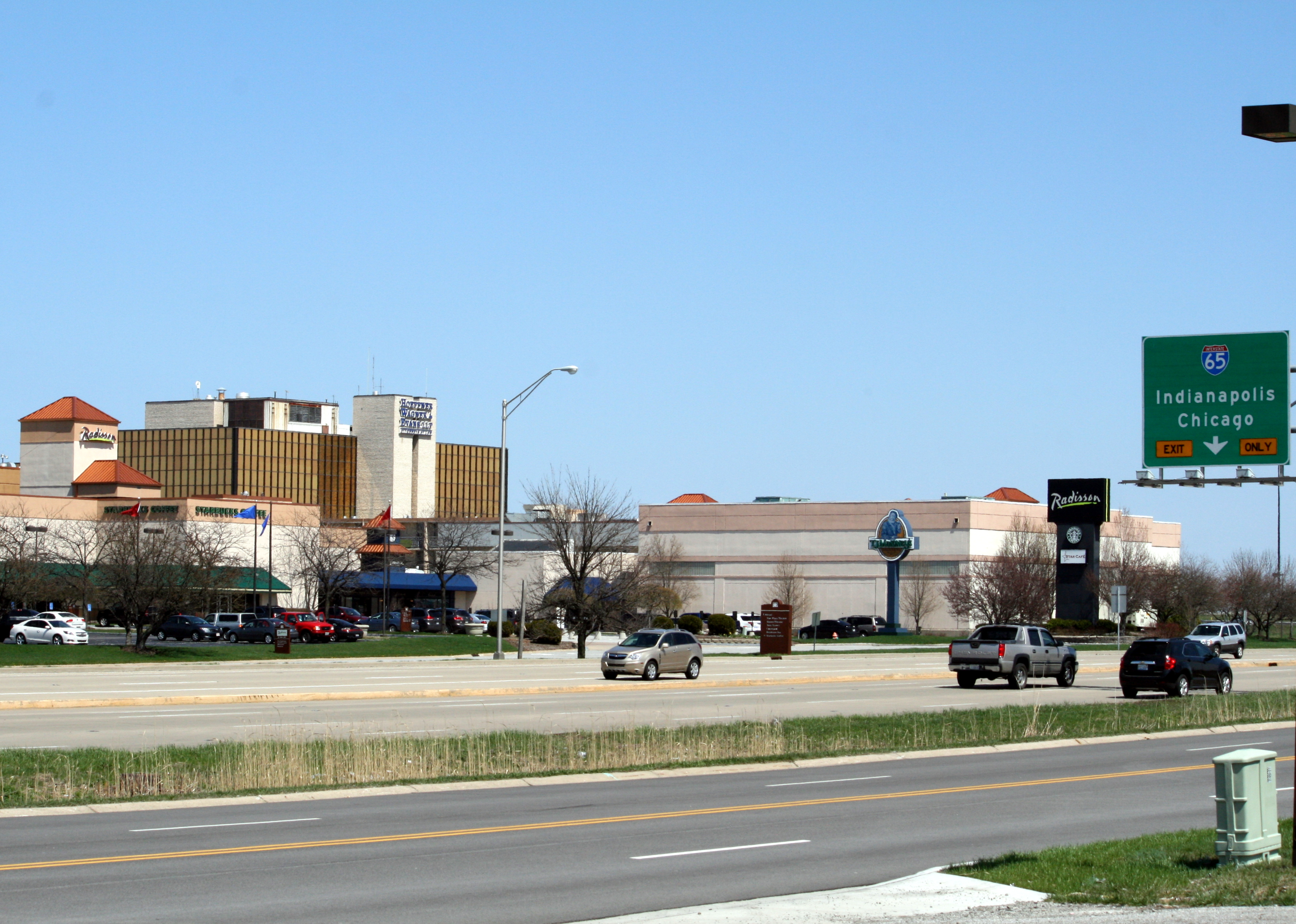
Merrillville as seen from junction of US 30 and I-65

According to the 2010 census, Merrillville has a total area of 33.26 square miles (86.14 km^{2}), of which 33.22 square miles (86.04 km^{2}) (or 99.88%) is land and 0.04 square miles (0.10 km^{2}) (or 0.12%) is water.

The town is centered on the intersection of U.S. Route 30 and Interstate 65.

The Lincoln Highway runs through Merrillville. The original alignment of Lincoln Highway is known as 73rd Avenue (also called Old Lincoln Highway) in Merrillville, while the current Lincoln Highway (US 30) is known as 81st Avenue. State Road 53 (Broadway) and State Road 55 (Taft Street) traverse the town from north to south.

Merrillville's asymmetric shape results in numerous boundaries with other municipalities. It is bordered by Gary and unincorporated Calumet Township, Lake County, to the north; Hobart to the northeast; Union Township, Porter County, to the east; Winfield and Crown Point to the south; Schererville to the west; and Griffith to the northwest.

Merrillville

Climate chart (precipitation, max. and min. temperature)
J	F	M	A	M	J	J	A	S	O	N	D
1.7 32 15	1.4 36 18	2.5 48 28	3.7 60 38	3.7 72 47	3.9 82 57	3.7 85 62	3.7 84 61	4.1 77 54	2.8 66 44	3.3 51 34	2.6 36 21
- █ Average max. and min. temperatures in °F
- █ Precipitation totals in inches
- Source: Countrystudies.us
Metric conversion
J	F	M	A	M	J	J	A	S	O	N	D
43 0 −9	36 2 −8	64 9 −2	94 16 3	94 22 8	99 28 14	94 29 17	94 29 16	104 25 12	71 19 7	84 11 1	66 2 −6
- █ Average max. and min. temperatures in °C
- █ Precipitation totals in mm

== History ==
Merrillville occupies what used to be woodland belonging to the Potawatomi Indians. In 1834, a clearing was created for ceremonial purposes and called McGwinn Village. A year later, a white man, Jeremiah Wiggins, settled in the place; McGwinn Village became Wiggins Point.

Wiggins Point became a well-known stop for wagon trains heading to Joliet, Illinois along the Sauk Trail (also called the Sac Trail), an old Indian trail. At one time, 16 trails radiated outward from Wiggins Point. In 1838, Wiggins died. Sometime afterward, local settlers renamed the place Centerville. Later still, it was renamed Merrillville after the brothers Dudley and William Merrill. Dudley Merrill operated a hotel and store in Centerville, and his son John P. Merrill was a Township Trustee.

Nearby, in the same former Potawatomi hunting grounds, other settlements had sprung up. Near Deep River creek was a settlement named Deep River; near Turkey Creek was another settlement with that creek's name. Others included Ainsworth, Lottaville, and Rexville. At one time, the post office for the area was named Lottaville.

In 1848, all of these settlements, including Merrillville (that is, the old McGwinn Village) were collected into one and called Ross Township. As time went by, bits and pieces of Ross Township were taken by Hobart and Crown Point when those towns incorporated.

In 1971, the area officially became Merrillville (which now includes the old Merrillville as well as other settlements nearby) and was incorporated as a town under Indiana law. During this time, the majority of the town's growth was due to white flight from Gary.

In 1993, Merrillville tried to annex unincorporated Winfield Township to get more land. The residents blocked Merrillville by creating the town of Winfield.

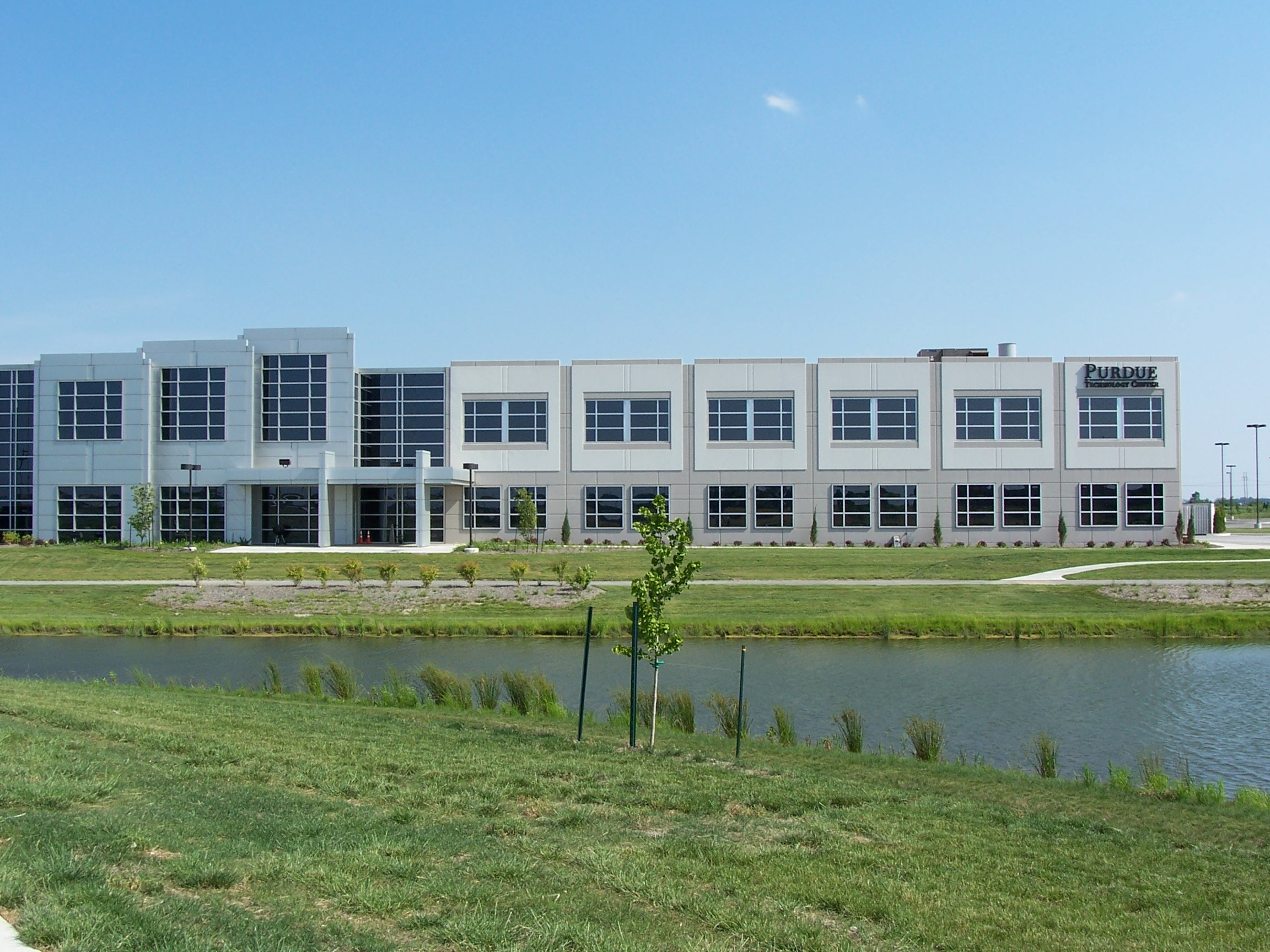
Purdue Technology Center at Ameriplex at the Crossroads in Merrillville

In 2009, a pedestrian bridge at Hidden Lake Park collapsed, injuring at least 25 people The catastrophe occurred around 10 PM after the annual Fourth of July fireworks display, when several dozen people attempted to cross the wood suspension bridge. Police officers stationed at either side of the bridge were unable to stop the advancing parkgoers, and with numerous people jumping up and down the 30-year-old bridge collapsed, sending somewhere around 50 people into the waters of Hidden Lake.

The Morgan-Skinner-Boyd Homestead and John Wood Old Mill are listed in the National Register of Historic Places.

== Economy ==
Merrillville is a hub for retail trade in Northwest Indiana. The US 30 corridor between Taft Street and Colorado Street harbors a large concentration of big-box retailers, hotels, restaurants, and automobile dealerships.

Ameriplex at the Crossroads, an industrial and technology park, opened at Broadway between 93rd Avenue and 101st Avenue in 2005. The development is designated an Indiana Certified Technology Park and includes a business incubator and technology center operated by the Purdue Research Foundation.

Heavy industry such as steelmaking and petroleum refining, which characterizes the economy of northern Lake County, does not have a significant presence in Merrillville. The town is home to the corporate headquarters of Fortune 500 energy company NiSource, hospitality management firm White Lodging, and Centier Bank, Indiana's largest privately owned independent bank.

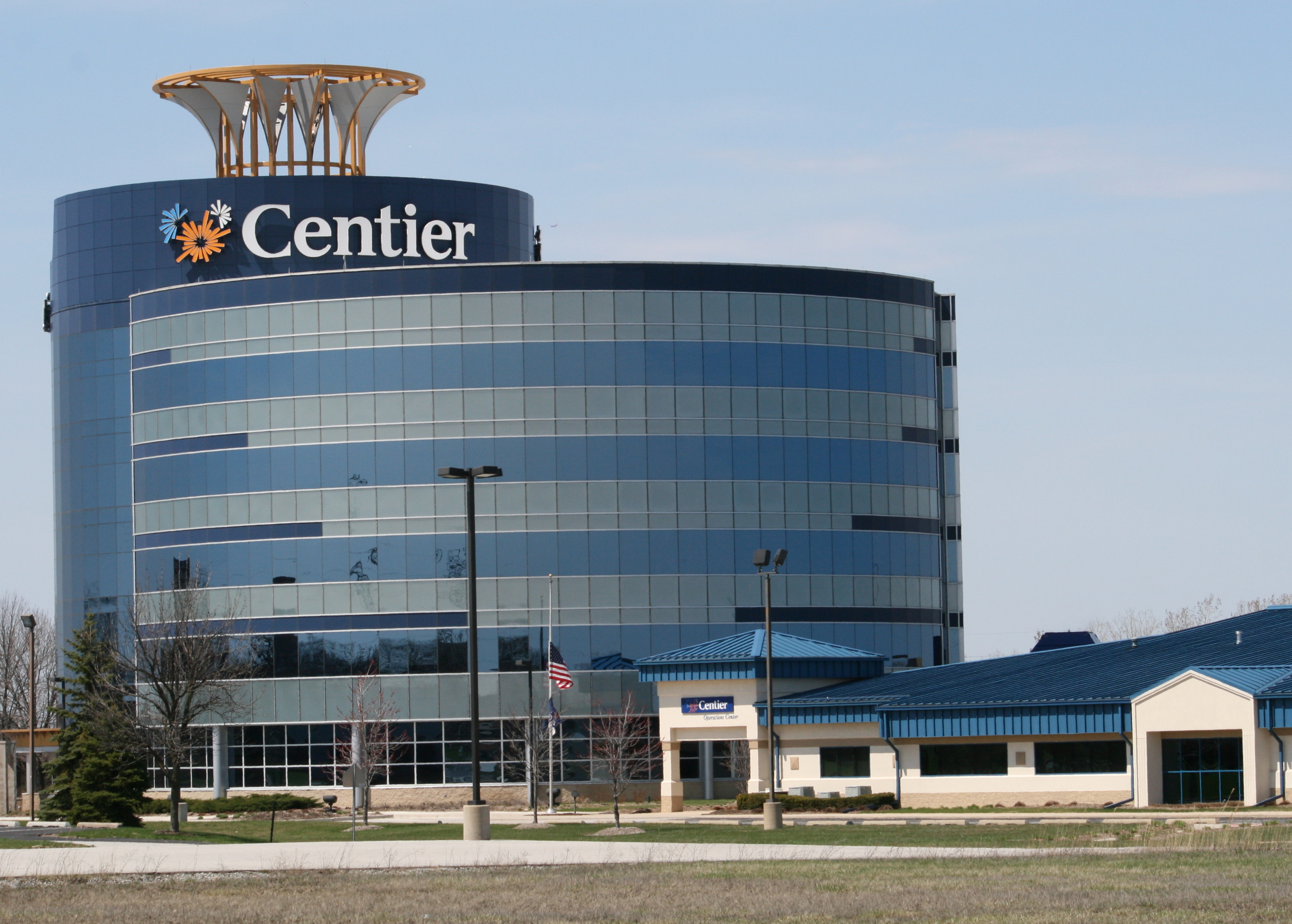
Centier Bank

Merrillville's nearest commercial airports are Griffith-Merrillville Airport in Griffith and Gary/Chicago International Airport in Gary.

== Demographics ==
Historical population
Census	Pop.	Note	%±
1970	15,918		—
1980	27,677		73.9%
1990	27,257		−1.5%
2000	30,560		12.1%
2010	35,246		15.3%
2020	36,444		3.4%
Source: US Census Bureau.

=== Racial and ethnic composition ===
Merrillville town, Indiana – Racial and ethnic composition Note: the US Census treats Hispanic/Latino as an ethnic category. This table excludes Latinos from the racial categories and assigns them to a separate category. Hispanics/Latinos may be of any race.
Race / Ethnicity (NH = Non-Hispanic)	Pop 2000	Pop 2010	Pop 2020	% 2000	% 2010	% 2020
White alone (NH)	19,701	14,095	10,827	64.47%	39.99%	29.71%
Black or African American alone (NH)	6,908	15,410	18,262	22.60%	43.72%	50.11%
Native American or Alaska Native alone (NH)	59	47	56	0.19%	0.13%	0.15%
Asian alone (NH)	450	412	486	1.47%	1.17%	1.33%
Native Hawaiian or Pacific Islander alone (NH)	3	4	5	0.01%	0.01%	0.01%
Other race alone (NH)	49	62	116	0.16%	0.18%	0.32%
Mixed race or Multiracial (NH)	440	683	1,317	1.44%	1.94%	3.61%
Hispanic or Latino (any race)	2,950	4,533	5,375	9.65%	12.86%	14.75%
Total	30,560	35,246	36,444	100.00%	100.00%	100.00%

=== 2020 census ===
As of the 2020 census, Merrillville had a population of 36,444. The population density was 1,095.7 inhabitants per square mile (423.1/km^{2}). The median age was 40.0 years; 22.2% of residents were under the age of 18 and 17.6% were 65 years of age or older. For every 100 females there were 87.5 males, and for every 100 females age 18 and over there were 83.3 males age 18 and over.

96.7% of residents lived in urban areas, while 3.3% lived in rural areas.

There were 14,590 households in Merrillville, of which 29.4% had children under the age of 18 living in them. Of all households, 37.5% were married-couple households, 18.8% were households with a male householder and no spouse or partner present, and 37.1% were households with a female householder and no spouse or partner present. About 32.3% of all households were made up of individuals, and 13.6% had someone living alone who was 65 years of age or older. The average family size was 3.27.

There were 15,540 housing units, of which 6.1% were vacant. The homeowner vacancy rate was 2.2% and the rental vacancy rate was 7.9%.

=== Income and poverty ===
As of 2020, the median income for a household in the town was $62,221 while the median income for a family in the town was $84,667. About 14.5% of the population were estimated to be below the poverty line.

=== 2010 census ===
As of the census of 2010, there were 35,246 people, 13,696 households, and 9,016 families living in the town. The population density was 1,061.0 inhabitants per square mile (409.7/km^{2}). There were 14,842 housing units at an average density of 446.8 per square mile (172.5/km^{2}). The racial makeup of the town was 46.4% White, 44.5% African American, 0.2% Native American, 1.2% Asian, 4.6% from other races, and 3.2% from two or more races. Hispanic or Latino of any race were 12.9% of the population.

There were 13,696 households, of which 34.1% had children under the age of 18 living with them, 42.3% were married couples living together, 17.9% had a female householder with no husband present, 5.6% had a male householder with no wife present, and 34.2% were non-families. 29.7% of all households were made up of individuals, and 11.8% had someone living alone who was 65 years of age or older. The average household size was 2.54 and the average family size was 3.16.

The median age in the town was 36.7 years. 25.5% of residents were under the age of 18; 8.6% were between the ages of 18 and 24; 26.8% were from 25 to 44; 25.5% were from 45 to 64; and 13.7% were 65 years of age or older. The gender makeup of the town was 47.0% male and 53.0% female.

As of 2010, the median income for a household in the town was $49,469 while the mean income for a household in the town was $57,728. The median income for a family was $56,911 and the mean income for a family was $65,925. The estimated per capita income for the town was $22,993. About 8.9% of families and 12.0% of the population were estimated to be below the poverty line.

=== 2000 census ===
As of the census of 2000, there were 30,560 people, 11,678 households, and 8,127 families living in the town. The population density was 918.2 inhabitants per square mile (354.5/km^{2}). There were 12,303 housing units at an average density of 369.6 per square mile (142.7/km^{2}). The racial makeup of the town was 69.65% White, 22.86% African American, 0.33% Native American, 1.51% Asian, 0.02% Pacific Islander, 3.39% from other races, and 2.24% from two or more races. Hispanic or Latino of any race were 9.65% of the population.

There were 11,678 households, out of which 32.2% had children under the age of 18 living with them, 52.9% were married couples living together, 12.6% had a female householder with no husband present, and 30.4% were non-families. 26.1% of all households were made up of individuals, and 11.8% had someone living alone who was 65 years of age or older. The average household size was 2.57 and the average family size was 3.12.

In the town, the population was spread out, with 24.6% under the age of 18, 8.7% from 18 to 24, 29.4% from 25 to 44, 22.2% from 45 to 64, and 15.1% who were 65 years of age or older. The median age was 37 years. For every 100 females, there were 91.2 males. For every 100 females age 18 and over, there were 86.7 males.

The median income for a household in the town was $49,545, and the median income for a family was $56,355. Males had a median income of $41,820 versus $29,005 for females. The per capita income for the town was $22,293. About 2.6% of families and 4.3% of the population were below the poverty line, including 4.1% of those under age 18 and 5.5% of those age 65 or over.

== Transportation ==
Barons Bus Lines services Merrillville seven days per week as part of schedule 0025, westbound, with local service between Cleveland, Ohio and Chicago, Illinois.

Gary Public Transportation Corporation provides bus service along the Broadway Avenue Corridor via the Broadway Metro Express and within the US 30 retail/office corridor. The closest South Shore Line station is in downtown Gary and can be reached using the Broadway Metro Express or Barons Bus schedule 0025. The closest Amtrak station is in Dyer, Indiana. It cannot be directly reached by public transit.

== Education ==
Public education in the town is provided by the Merrillville Community School Corporation. Andrean High School, a Roman Catholic institution operated by the Diocese of Gary, is also in Merrillville.

Lake County Public Library operates the Central Library at 1919 West 81st Avenue in Merrillville.

== Notable people ==
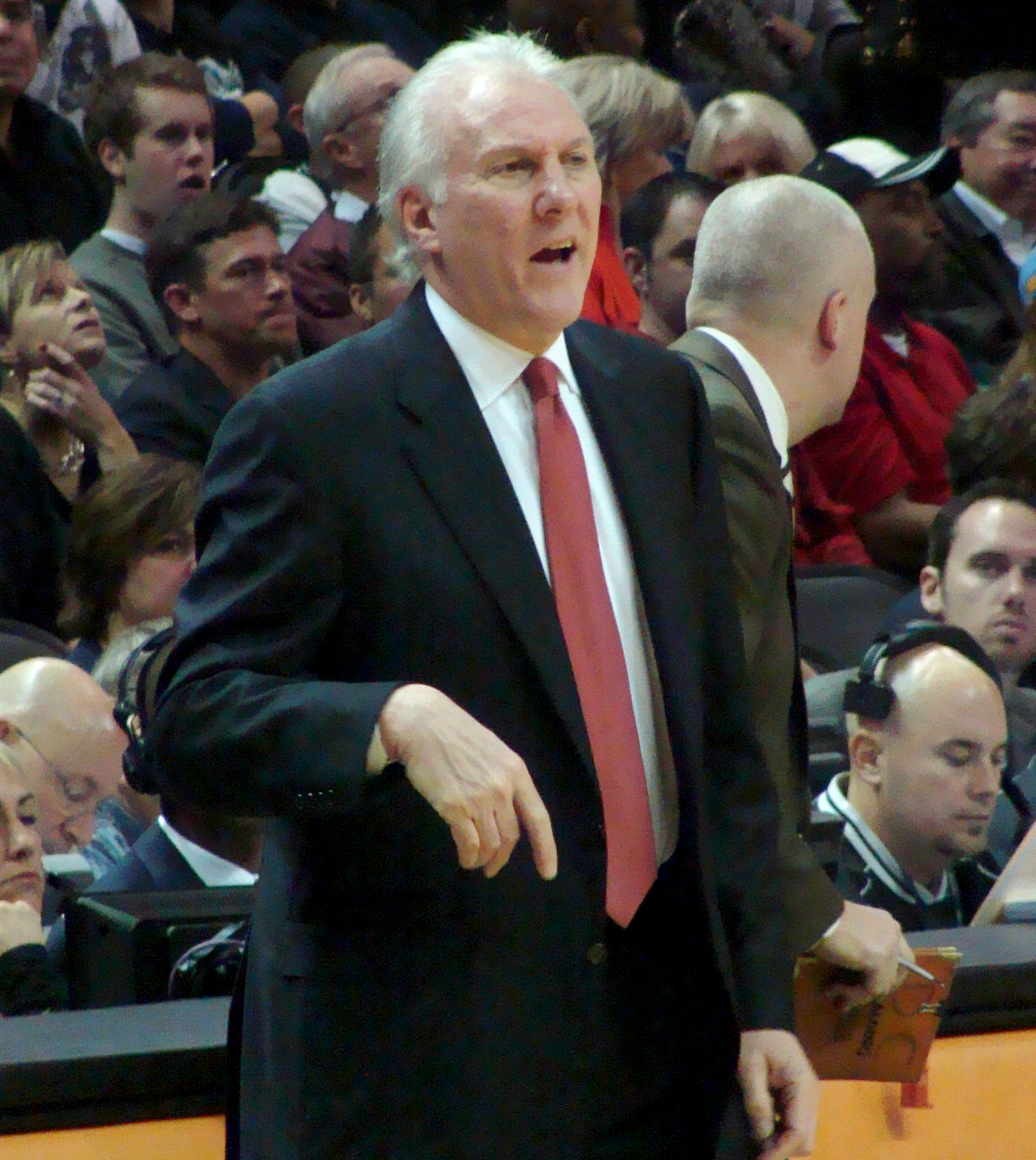
Gregg Popovich in 2010

- CJ Alexander, Major League Baseball player
- David Bedella, actor
- Cristal C. Brisco, lawyer
- Chris Chyung, politician
- Dan Dakich, basketball sportscaster
- Chet Dobis, politician
- Dianne Durham, gymnast
- Kenneth Grant, football player
- Kody Hoese, professional baseball player
- Tom Jelesky, National Football League player
- Brandon Jordan, football player and coach
- Ted Karras Jr., football player and coach
- Rodolfo Lozano, lawyer
- Maureen Mahoney, lawyer
- Sean Manaea, Major League Baseball pitcher
- Len Matela, professional basketball player
- Karen McDougal, model
- Mike Neal, National Football League player
- David Neville, athlete, Olympic Gold and Bronze medalist
- Craig Osika, National Football League player
- Gregg Popovich, National Basketball Association coach
- Iliana Regan, chef
- Jeff Samardzija, Major League Baseball pitcher
- Michael Tanke, soccer player and coach
- Ryan Tatusko, professional baseball pitcher
- Pete Visclosky, politician
- Eugene Wilson, National Football League player

== See also ==
- Albanese Candy
- List of U.S. communities with African-American majority populations in 2020
