= New Elliott, Indiana =

- Unincorporated community
- Location within Indiana Location within the United States
- Coordinates: 41°29′35″N 87°25′03″W
- Country: United States
- State: Indiana
- County: Lake
- Township: St. John
- Elevation: 643 ft (196 m)
- ZIP code: 46319 (Griffith)
- Area code: 219
- FIPS code: 18-52866
- GNIS feature ID: 440043

New Elliott is an unincorporated community in St. John Township, Lake County, Indiana, laying between Schererville and Griffth.

Considered somewhat remote when settlement began, the community was briefly dubbed McCarthyville when the first resident arrived in 1940 with the surname McCarthy, and was swiftly renamed "New Elliott" in 1941, taking the name "Elliott" from a former abandoned rail station in the area. A proposal to incorporate the community in 1956 did not come to fruition.

It once had its own volunteer fire department which merged into the Schererville volunteer fire department in 1977.

As Schererville continues to grow, portions of the New Elliott area have been at times a controversial target for annexation.
