= WRTW =

Christian radio station in Crown Point, Indiana

Coordinates: 41.349°N 87.401°W

- Crown Point, Indiana; United States
- Broadcast area: Chicago market; Northwest Indiana
- Frequency: 90.5 MHz
- Branding: The Key

Programming
- Format: Christian radio

Ownership
- Owner: Hyles Anderson College

History
- First air date: May 2010
- Call sign meaning: "We Reach the World"

Technical information
- Licensing authority: FCC
- Facility ID: 28188
- Class: B1
- ERP: 3,100 watts
- HAAT: 183 meters (600 ft)
- Repeater: 90.5 WRTK (Paxton, Illinois)

Links
- Public license information: Public file; LMS
- Website: thekeyfm.com

WRTW is a Christian radio station licensed in Crown Point, Indiana, broadcasting on 90.5 FM. It is owned by Hyles Anderson College. Its studios are located in the former federal courthouse and post office building on State Street in Downtown Hammond.

WRTW airs traditional Christian music and locally produced Christian talk and teaching programs, as well as national programs such as Thru the Bible with J. Vernon McGee, Family Altar with Lester Roloff, and Unshackled! The station has also aired local high school sports games.

== History ==
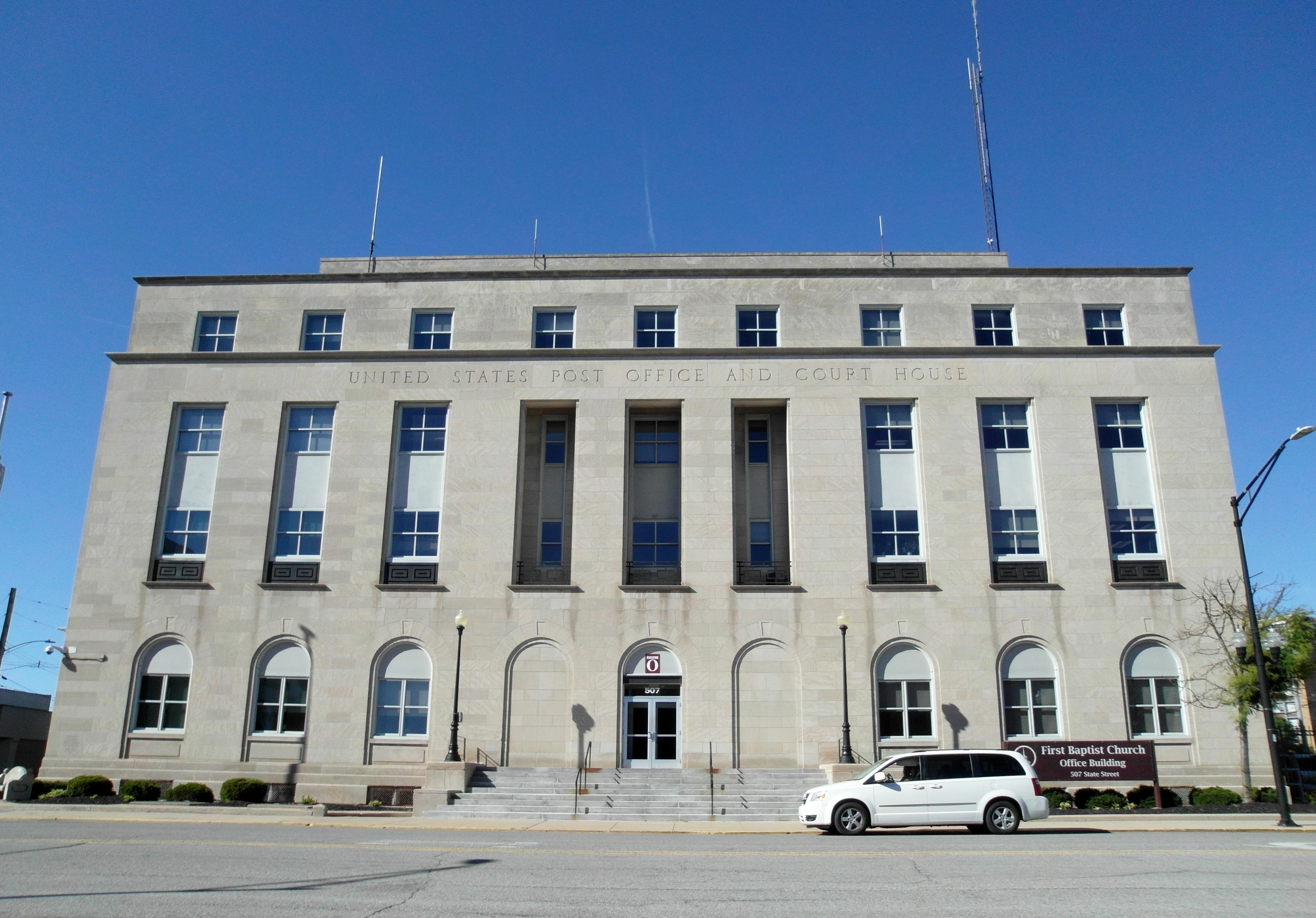
Former Hammond Post Office and Federal Courthouse, home to WRTW's studios.

Hyles-Anderson College first applied for a construction permit to build a station at 90.5 FM in 1989. However, Moody Bible Institute filed a competing application for the frequency and was granted a construction permit to build a station, which was to simulcast WMBI-FM. Moody's station was never built, and Hyles-Anderson was granted a construction permit in 2007. The station began broadcasting in May 2010.

== Simulcast ==
In 2010, Hyles-Anderson College purchased the construction permit for a new radio station at 90.5 FM in Paxton, Illinois from the California Association for Research and Education, Inc. for $15,000. On May 14, 2012, WRTW began to be simulcast on WRTK in Paxton, covering East-Central Illinois.

| Call sign | Frequency | City of license | FID | ERP (W) | HAAT | Class | FCC info |
|---|---|---|---|---|---|---|---|
| WRTK | 90.5 FM | Paxton, Illinois | 176945 | 3,000 | 128 m (420 ft) | A | LMS |
