= Lester Roloff =

American Baptist preacher (1914–1982)

- Born: June 28, 1914; Dawson, Navarro County; Texas, US
- Died: November 2, 1982 (aged 68); Near Normangee, Texas
- Education: Baylor University; Southwestern Baptist Theological Seminary
- Occupations: Author, teen home operator, Independent Baptist evangelist and pastor

Lester Leo Roloff (June 28, 1914 – November 2, 1982) was an American fundamentalist Independent Baptist preacher and the founder of teen homes across the American South. The operation of those teen homes (primarily his Rebekah Home for Girls) placed him in the public spotlight.

== Early ministry ==
Born of German descent, Roloff was reared in Dawson in Navarro County in east-central Texas. He began preaching at the age of 18. He attended Baylor University in Waco (Roloff is reported to have brought his dairy cow with him to raise tuition funds through the sale of its milk), and later Southwestern Baptist Theological Seminary in Fort Worth.

After graduation, Roloff began preaching at small country churches in southern Texas before taking on pastoral duties at churches in Houston and later Corpus Christi.

== The Family Altar ==
In Corpus Christi in 1944, Roloff began his radio show, The Family Altar. The show consists of recordings of his sermons, aired in both 15- and 30-minute programs. Roloff also incorporated singing into his sermons, and would occasionally break into impromptu singing of hymns and/or leading his choir to sing along. Each program has recordings of Roloff singing "When Jesus Comes (One Sat Alone Beside the Highway)" at the beginning and "The Stranger Who Sat by the Sea" (or the congregational hymn "Living by Faith") at the end, accompanied only by organ.

== Ministry expands ==
In 1950, Roloff was called upon to fill in as preacher at a series of revival meetings in Corpus Christi after the scheduled speaker, B. B. Crim, died. The enthusiastic reaction to Roloff's preaching led him to resign his pastorate and pursue full-time evangelism. Roloff Evangelistic Enterprises was hence incorporated the following year.

Roloff preached stridently against homosexuality, communism, television, alcohol, tobacco, drugs, gluttony, and psychology. His strong stands led to disagreements with most of his Southern Baptist brethren. In 1956, after giving a speech at his alma mater Baylor University criticizing denominationalism, Roloff broke with the SBC and joined the Independent Baptist movement.

In 1954, Roloff returned to pastoral ministry with the establishment of the Alameda Street Baptist Church in Corpus Christi, an Independent Baptist congregation. He remained there until 1961, when he resumed full-time evangelistic ministry. In 1967, he started another Independent Baptist church in Corpus Christi, Peoples Baptist Church, at which he remained until his death.

== The Roloff Homes ==
Roloff began actively ministering to alcoholic and homeless men. His first mission house was established in Corpus Christi in 1954. Additional children's homes were eventually added throughout Texas, Oklahoma, and Georgia. The first Roloff home for females, Rebekah Home for Girls, was established in 1968, which brought in young girls who were addicted to drugs, involved in prostitution, serving jail time, kicked out of their homes, or in need of refuge.

The only literature permitted to those living in the Roloff homes was the King James Version of the Bible. Television was forbidden, and only one hour of radio per day was permitted, to listen to Roloff's radio sermons. Daily church attendance was mandatory; each Roloff home had its own church and pastor on the grounds. Other policies, in accordance to the state, included windows being locked and alarm systems to prevent any truancy or escape. Contact with the outside world was denied except for monitored phone calls with parents. In addition, each dorm room had an intercom and loudspeaker.

In December 2001, Texas Monthly reported on the (then closed) Rebekah Home:

Discipline at the Rebekah Home was rooted in a verse from Proverbs: "Withhold not correction from the child: for if thou beatest him with the rod, he shall not die." The dictum was liberally applied. Local authorities first investigated possible abuse at the Rebekah Home in 1973, when parents who were visiting their daughter reported seeing a girl being whipped. When welfare workers attempted to inspect the home, Roloff refused them entry on the grounds that it would infringe on the separation between church and state. Attorney General John Hill promptly filed suit against Roloff Evangelistic Enterprises, introducing affidavits from 16 Rebekah girls who said they had been whipped with leather straps, beaten with paddles, handcuffed to drainpipes, and locked in isolation cells—sometimes for such minor infractions as failing to memorize a Bible passage or forgetting to make a bed. Roloff defended these methods as good, old-fashioned discipline, solidly supported by Scripture, and denied that any treatment at Rebekah constituted abuse. During an evidentiary hearing, he made his position clear by declaring, "Better a pink bottom than a black soul." Attorney General Hill bluntly replied that it was not pink bottoms to which he objected, but ones that were blue, black, and bloody. Still refusing to submit his youth homes to state oversight, Roloff met with Hill, and with the Honeybee Quartet in tow, he prayed and wept for the salvation of Hill's soul. Unmoved, Hill pressed his case, and in 1974, a state district judge found Roloff in contempt of court and sentenced the preacher to five days behind bars. Roloff headed off to jail – as he would two more times during the state's long-running case against him – wearing a smile, with his well-worn Bible tucked under his arm.

Some of the homes were temporarily closed in 1973 because Roloff refused on church-state issues to license the home through the state government. The institutions reopened in 1974 after Roloff successfully appealed to the Texas Supreme Court, which ruled in Roloff's favor that it was unconstitutional to close the homes down. At one point, Roloff transferred ownership of the homes from his evangelistic corporation to his church, thus compelling the state to sue the "new" owners (and restart the entire litigation) while he kept the homes running. The Attorney General refiled the case and secured an injunction that tried to shut down the ministry. In 1975, the state passed laws that required the licensing of youth homes. Roloff was arrested twice for refusing to comply with this law.

In 1979, in an incident known as the "Christian Alamo", Roloff urged churches and pastors across America who supported his ministry to come to Corpus Christi and form a human chain around the church to prevent the Texas Department of Human Resources from removing children from the homes. Even after his death, legal battles with the State of Texas continued, and ultimately the homes were closed in 1985.

However, the homes reopened in 1997 after a new law was passed that allowed faith-based institutions to opt out of state licensing requirements. The law was subject to renewal in 2001 and was not renewed at that time (primarily on the basis that, of the then 2,015 faith-based institutions operating various types of child-care facilities, only a mere seven chose the opt-out provision), whereupon the homes were once again closed.

== Death ==
Roloff had always had a fascination with flight. He purchased his first airplane in 1954 and used it to travel between his various speaking engagements throughout the country. On November 2, 1982, the same day that the Democrat Mark Wells White, the outgoing attorney general, unseated Republican Governor Bill Clements, Roloff's plane crashed during a storm outside Normangee, Texas. Roloff and a ladies' singing trio from the home for adult women, along with another woman working at the home, were killed. White had vowed, if elected governor, to shut down Roloff's homes. The wreckage of the crashed airplane used to be a centerpiece of Roloff Park at Hyles-Anderson College, a Bible college in Crown Point, Indiana, partly named for the pastor Jack Hyles.

== Roloff's legacy ==
Roloff is cited as a major influence on both the Christian fundamentalist homeschooling and youth movements. His final recorded sermon was preached at Tennessee Temple University in Chattanooga, Tennessee, and is entitled "Hills that Help". Roloff was posthumously inducted in 1993 into the National Religious Broadcasters Hall of Fame.

Roloff Evangelistic Enterprises is still in operation and the ministry continues to broadcast reruns of The Family Altar program on smaller, privately owned radio stations, as well as shortwave radio, and sell copies of Roloff's sermons. In 2017, the organization moved its mailing address to Fort Thomas, Arizona, and relocated its operations to a nearby Native American facility, which it opened in the early 1980s.

People's Baptist Church also remains in operation, but no longer operates teenager group homes. The church now operates homes for adult men and women being treated for alcohol and drug addiction.

The Roloff homes have a legacy of accusations. Many have accused them of abuse, while Roloff argued that strict discipline was necessary for proper correction. Throughout the history of the Roloff homes, there have been claims of abuse and brainwashing from former students, while there also exists denial from staff and some former students claiming that these allegations are exaggerated.

== Beliefs ==
=== Soteriology ===
In Lester Roloff's sermon, "Dr. Law and Dr. Grace.", Roloff described the law as revealing humanity's sins and exposing their inability to attain righteousness through their own works. This understanding, he explained, serves to guide individuals toward grace, where they can find forgiveness and redemption. Lester Roloff taught that one can only be saved through faith in Jesus Christ's shed blood and his atoning death, and that assurance of salvation is possible. He strongly defended the doctrine of eternal security. Regarding prayer, Roloff taught that while prayer itself does not save a person, it is required for salvation, stating that a person who has never prayed has never been saved.

Roloff believed that even when a person is born again, they still have their old sinful nature alongside their new Spiritual nature.

=== Eschatology ===
Lester Roloff believed in the pretribulational rapture, teaching that the rapture is imminent and could happen at any time.

=== Bibliology ===
Lester Roloff was King James Only, stating that he looked upon the King James Bible the same way he looks upon his mother, believing that modern versions wrongly omit verses from the Bible. In his sermons, he also often advocated for memorizing the Bible.

=== Health ===
Roloff's views on health from a biblical standpoint remain influential among some Christians today. He highly recommended raw, uncooked fruits, vegetables, eggs, and cheese, as well as fasting and drinking vegetable juice, and taught that the diet found in Leviticus chapter 11 should be followed. Other viewpoints on health included total abstinence from tobacco, alcohol, and television.

Roloff also advocated for a reform of modern medicine. He once said in a sermon, "We're looking for a color-coded new world: a green pill for anxiety, a yellow pill for frustration, an orange pill for unhappiness, a black pill for a bad day at the office, and a white one when all else fails ... I believe that these pills are not necessary; only because there's a certain man in this country that has failed to give the right pill. The preacher has not given the god-pill. Therefore, they're on every pill you can think of, and none of them are working."
