= E.J. and E. Griffith Interlocking Tower =

- U.S. National Register of Historic Places
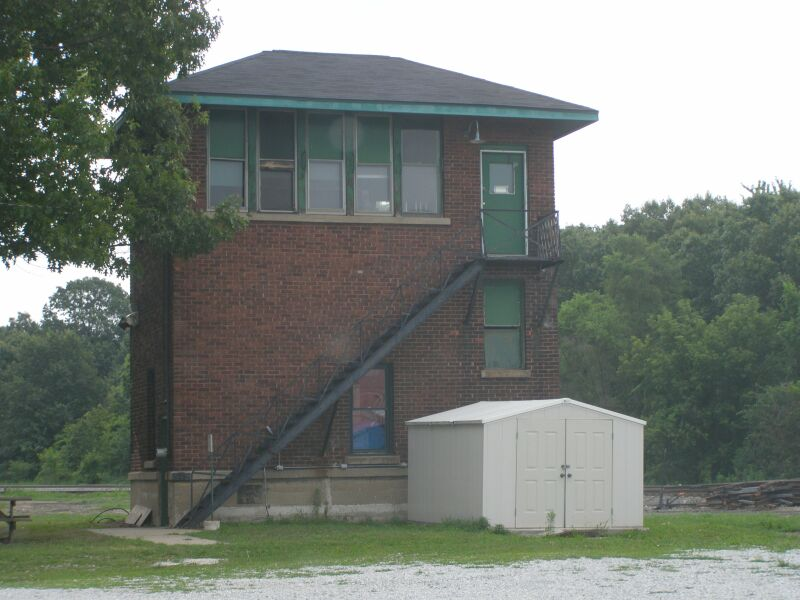
- EJ&E Interlocking Tower, July 2010

- Location within Indiana Location within the United States
- Location: 201 S. Broad St., Griffith, Indiana
- Coordinates: 41°31′16″N 87°25′39″W
- Area: 0 acres (0 ha)
- Built: 1924
- Built by: Elgin, Joliet, & Eastern RY. Co.
- Architectural style: Bungalow/craftsman
- NRHP reference No.: 03000980
- Added to NRHP: September 28, 2003

E.J. and E. Griffith Interlocking Tower is a historic interlocking tower located at Griffith, Indiana. It was built in 1924 by the Elgin, Joliet and Eastern Railway. It is a three-story, brick building measuring 25 feet long, 16 feet wide, and 30 feet tall. It has a concrete foundation and low pitched hipped roof. The depot operated until 1999. It was moved to its present location in the Griffith Historical Park and Railroad Museum in 2000.

It was listed in the National Register of Historic Places in 2003.
