= Preying from the Pulpit =

1993 television news series

Preying from the Pulpit was a mini-news series produced in May 1993 by WJBK of Detroit, Michigan, for the 11:00 pm news. The news report argued that sexual abuse in seven different churches around the United States were all connected to First Baptist Church of Hammond and its Pastor, Jack Hyles. Hyles called the program "poor journalism" and organized a national campaign to respond.

== Description ==
The news report aired a six-part series stemming from child sexual abuse allegations against deacon Mark Foeller and associate pastor Timothy Leonard (a graduate of Hyles-Anderson College, an unaccredited institution), of North Sharon Baptist Church near Ann Arbor." Leonard, "North Sharon's associate pastor and a graduate of Hyles Anderson College of Schererville, was charged in Michigan with first- and second-degree sexual assault of children." The San Diego Union-Tribune noted "the news report found seven U.S. churches - all with ties to Jack Hyles, it said - involved in sex scandals." Thus, the TV station noted alleged child molestations at a church "appeared to be part of a pattern among 'churches that follow the teachings and philosophy' of Hyles, First Baptist and its related Hyles-Anderson College of Crown Point, Indiana."

The mini-series "showed footage during its report of [Hyles] brandishing a rifle from the pulpit", along with "people with guns and walkie-talkies patrolling the outside of the church at times." Additionally "the station also recapped a sermon in 1990 in which Hyles pretended to pour poison into a glass and asked an associate pastor, Johnny Colsten, to drink from it. Colsten said he would." Furthermore, "The WJBK report said the sermon has the 'ring of Jonestown' to it—the mass suicide in Guyana in 1978 by followers of cult leader Jim Jones." In fact "WJBK also reported that Hyles, though never claiming to be God, has convinced a lot of people he is the next best thing to Him."

The report also described the links of "a deacon at First Baptist, A.V. Ballenger, [who] was found guilty of one count of child molestation dating from 1991." Also discussed in the news report was the comments Hyles made to the parents of the girl molested by Ballenger. In a 1991 article, the Chicago Tribune reported that Hyles was sued for $1 million by the parents of the girl molested by Ballenger. The paper reported the "lawsuit claims Hyles and the church had not fulfilled their obligation to ensure that children were protected from harm during Sunday school." This stemmed from their mentioning the molestation to Hyles who then promised to "investigate". After two months of nothing being done, the parents went to the police. Furthermore, "the suit, filed last week, claims the minister told the child's parents that Ballenger 'just liked little girls,' and, 'You don't have a case.'" Hyles and the church settled out of court. Ballenger was sentenced to five years in prison.

== Investigation ==
The Detroit news program was not the only one to study if there was a connection between deacon Ballenger at Hyles' church and the North Sharon associate pastor, who graduated from Hyles-Anderson College. The prosecuting attorney for Washtenaw County, Michigan, went to the Ballenger trial "to watch, listen to testimony and observe similarities between this case and other cases involving a rural church [in] Michigan."

On May 14, 1993, "the FBI was asked to look into allegations minors were taken from Michigan to Northwest Indiana by employees or officials of North Sharon Baptist Church near Ann Arbor for events sponsored by Hammond First Baptist Church." The FBI concluded, "there is insufficient evidence to probe allegations." On Friday, May 19, 1993, Sgt. Charles Hedinger, a Hammond police detective, described the Hyles investigation as "open-ended."

Jack Hyles said that he welcomed an investigation by the police and he attended a meeting with city officials to discuss it. Hyles emerged from the meeting saying that there was no investigation. Confirmation of this came on Wednesday, May 24, 1993, the Chief of Police detectives, Capt. Bill Conner, was quoted in the Tribune saying that, "There is no investigation of the First Baptist Church of Hammond or Jack Hyles". On June 1, 1993, The Lake County, Indiana prosecutor's office stated that it did not have any cases involving Hyles or the First Baptist Church of Hammond. On the same day, the Hammond Police Department reaffirmed the statement it made the previous month when it confirmed that there was no investigation of Hyles or the church.

== Criticism of WJBK ==
Hyles told his congregation that WJBK's news anchorman was fired and 12 sponsors had dropped the evening news, but Mort Meisner, news director for WJBK, said neither of those statements were true.

On May 19, 1993, The Times of Northwest Indiana ran a story entitled Baptism by innuendo, which criticized WJBK-TV's reporting. The Times wrote, "If one were to take the insinuations of Detroit television station WJBK-TV seriously, one could get the impression that the First Baptist Church of Hammond is a sex-crime factory and that its pastors school in Hammond and the affiliated Hyles Anderson College in Schererville are institutions where people minor in molestation." The Times also suggested that the May ratings period, which is traditionally known for such similar sensationalized stories, was not a good enough excuse to make up for the poor journalism the stories displayed, concluding that the stories were "a monstrous overreach". The Times went on to say: "There is no large institution of any kind where some wrongdoers cannot be found. First Baptist and its affiliated institutions are no exception. To tar an entire congregation or student body and alumni with indiscriminate innuendo is highly irresponsible."

Soon afterwards, Hyles gave a speech in which he disputed the latest reports point by point. During that speech, Hyles said that those that the report indicated had attended Hyles-Anderson College really had not even attended the school. Several hundred people signed a statement supporting Hyles' in an advertisement placed in the Tuesday June 1, 1993 Chicago Sun-Times.
