= St. John Township, Lake County, Indiana =

St. John Township
- Township
- Coordinates: 41°28′36″N 87°27′45″W
- Country: United States
- State: Indiana
- County: Lake
- Founded: 1848

Government
  - Type: Indiana township

Area
  - Total: 39.37 sq mi (102.0 km^{2})
  - Land: 39.2 sq mi (102 km^{2})
  - Water: 0.17 sq mi (0.44 km^{2})
- Elevation: 679 ft (207 m)

Population (2020)
  - Total: 68,972
  - Density: 1,702.6/sq mi (657.4/km^{2})
- FIPS code: 18-66870
- GNIS feature ID: 453819
- Website: www.stjohntownshiptrustee.com

St. John Township is one of eleven townships in Lake County, Indiana. As of the 2010 census, its population was 66,741 and it contained 25,691 housing units.

Historical population
Census	Pop.	Note	%±
1890	1,686		—
1900	1,765		4.7%
1910	1,766		0.1%
1920	1,788		1.2%
1930	2,105		17.7%
1940	3,468		64.8%
1950	5,799		67.2%
1960	12,282		111.8%
1970	16,829		37.0%
1980	33,718		100.4%
1990	41,782		23.9%
2000	53,701		28.5%
2010	66,741		24.3%
2020	68,972		3.3%
Source: US Decennial Census

== History ==
St. John Township was established in 1848. It was named for John Hack, the first German settler.

== Geography ==
According to the 2010 census, the township has a total area of 39.37 square miles (102.0 km^{2}), of which 39.2 square miles (102 km^{2}) (or 99.57%) is land and 0.17 square miles (0.44 km^{2}) (or 0.43%) is water.

The township includes the towns of Dyer, Schererville and St. John as well as the unincorporated areas of these towns.

Zip codes in the township include 46307, 46311, 46319, 46373, and 46375. The State House districts are IN-11 and IN-15, and the State Senate districts are IN-1, IN-6, and a small portion of IN-2.

=== City ===
- Crown Point (small portion)

=== Towns ===
- Dyer
- Griffith (small portion)
- Schererville (vast majority)
- St. John (vast majority)

=== Other Communities ===
- Briar Ridge
- New Elliott

== Demographics ==
The racial makeup of the township is 82.1% non-Hispanic White, 11.3% Hispanic, 2.73% African American, 2.23% Asian, 0.58% from other races, and 1.13% from two or more races. The percentages of Hispanic and African American residents are, respectively, 5.4 and 22.6 percent lower than Lake County as a whole.

Native-born citizens make up 91.9% of the population. Naturalized citizens are 5.3% of the population, while 1.9% are not citizens. The top ten countries of birth for foreign-born residents are Mexico, India, Croatia, Poland, Serbia, Greece, Macedonia, Philippines, Germany, and Bosnia and Herzegovina. The most common self-reported ancestries are: German (23.1%), Polish (17%), Irish (15.9%), Mexican (8.72%), Unclassified/Unreported (8.5%), Italian (8.1%), English (7.3%), Dutch (5.6%), American (4.7%), and Serbian (2.8%).

== Education ==
Lake Central School Corporation is the school district covering the township.

Hyles–Anderson College is in the township.
