= Hyles–Anderson College =

Baptist college in Indiana, U.S.

Hyles-Anderson College
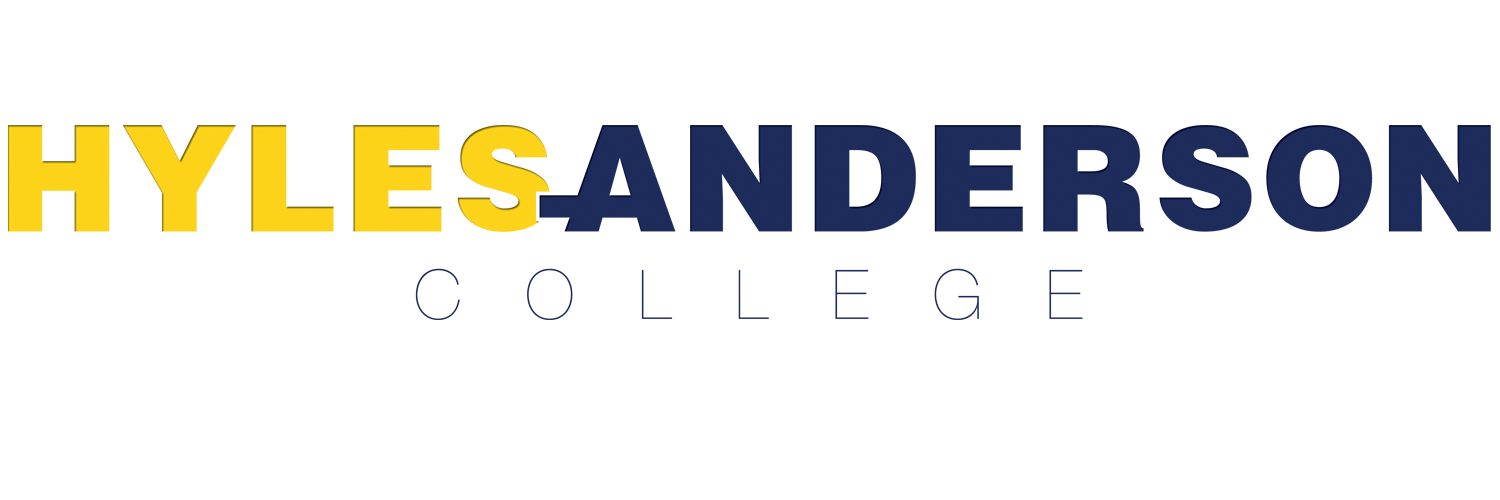
- Type: Unaccredited private college
- Established: 1972
- Religious affiliation: Independent Baptist
- Chancellor: John Wilkerson
- Vice-Chancellor: Ray Young
- Location: Crown Point, Indiana, United States; 41.465833°N 87.404644°W
- Colors: Blue and yellow
- Mascot: Lion
- Website: www.hylesanderson.edu

Hyles–Anderson College (HAC) is a private Independent Fundamental Baptist college in Crown Point, St. John Township, Lake County, Indiana. As a ministry of the First Baptist Church of Hammond, it focuses on training pastors, missionaries and Christian teachers to work in Independent Baptist schools. It was founded in 1972.

Olivia Empson of Vanity Fair described it as an "Actual, Literal College for Tradwives".

The college and the sponsoring church are noted for "a string of assaults and sexual crimes" spanning decades. Some are sexual crimes against children, including the 2013 conviction of chancellor Jack Schaap.

== History ==
In 1972, Hyles–Anderson College was founded by Jack Hyles with financial support from Russell Anderson. The school was originally located on a campus known as Baptist City in Schererville, Indiana. HAC's former campus was turned into Hammond Baptist K-12 school. This school is also operated by the First Baptist Church of Hammond.

The college's first president was Robert J. Billings, who later served as Ronald Reagan's "liaison to the fundamentalist Christian movement in the 1980 presidential campaign", before spending six years in the U.S. Education Department, as well as acting as a founding member of the Moral Majority.

In 1993 WJBK, a Detroit, Michigan news channel, produced a 30-minute documentary called Preying from the Pulpit that examined fresh claims of sex abuse in five different fundamentalist churches where church workers who molested children were traced back to Hyles–Anderson College. Besides the abuse, the program examined Hyles' teaching, including a 1990 sermon where Hyles "pretended to pour poison into a glass and asked an associate pastor, Johnny Colsten, to drink from it. Colsten said he would." The report said, "the sermon has the 'ring of Jonestown' to it—the mass suicide in Guyana in 1978 by followers of cult leader Jim Jones." Hyles called the program "poor journalism" and organized a national campaign to respond. The Times of Northwest Indiana also condemned WJBK's series, calling it "highly irresponsible" and "a monstrous overreach".

When Hyles died in 2001, his son-in-law Jack Schaap, a 1979 graduate and former vice president of the school since 1996, became chancellor. That same year, Hyles' boyhood home, a 384 square feet (35.7 m^{2}) shack in Italy, Texas was purchased to create a museum to honor Hyles, and was shipped from Texas to Hyles–Anderson College. Schaap was known for his "R-rated" sermons containing graphic sexual metaphors and remarks on women's bodies. Schaap was jailed to await sentencing in 2011 for having sex with a 16-year-old girl, to which he pleaded guilty. Schaap blamed the "aggressiveness" of the girl for his assault on her.

In 2012, Chicago Magazine reported that the school "[appeared] to be struggling", with only 1,000 students enrolled, down from 2,700 in its peak. That same year, school chancellor and graduate Jack Schaap was removed from his pastorate position at First Baptist Church of Hammond for having sex with a member of the church when she was 16. The girl, who was not named, was taking classes at Hyles–Anderson College. As a result, Lake County law enforcement began a criminal investigation into the church and its Hyles–Anderson College. Schaap was charged in a U.S. District Court for taking a minor across state lines to have sex with her and signed a plea agreement. In a sentencing memorandum, prosecutors alleged that Schaap "groomed" the girl, including kissing the victim during counseling and had sex with her in his office. In March 2013, Schaap was sentenced to 12 years in federal prison for having sex with an underage girl. His original release date was February 23, 2023. Schaap was released early from federal prison on May 4, 2022.

In 2015, Stuart Mason, the former President of Hyles–Anderson College, resigned to pastor the Timberline Baptist Church in Sherwood, Oregon. The current President is John Wilkerson, who is also the pastor of First Baptist Church of Hammond, Indiana.

In 2018, the school's dating manual was leaked, and listed several restriction on student relational behavior, including that relationships are subjected to parental approval.

Hyles–Anderson alumni have pastored at over 572 churches within the US and Guam. Over 123 alumni compose missionary families, church planters, and mission teams around the world with Fundamental Baptist Missions International and many hundreds have teamed up with other mission boards as well. One graduate, Jon Nelms, started the Final Frontiers Foundation mission board, which has led to the creation of over 44,000 churches worldwide.

Two women in 2020 accused college leadership of covering up a pattern of sexual abuse of children by David Hyles, the son of Jack Hyles.

== Academics, policies and accreditation ==
Hyles–Anderson College is not accredited by any recognized accreditation body. An essay on Hyles' website presents several arguments against accreditation. However, the U.S. armed services and public schools do not recognize unaccredited degrees, while several states restrict the use of degrees from unaccredited institutions.

All faculty, staff, and students are required to go soul-winning weekly by participating in the evangelistic ministry of the First Baptist Church of Hammond, Indiana. The 2008 college catalog claimed that 10,000 new baptisms are performed each year at the church.

For school year 2010–2011, HAC's catalog listed policies under the title "Maybe You Wouldn't Like...", detailing the prohibition of long hair on men, the use of alcohol, cigarettes, dance, Hollywood movies, playing cards, having "fellowship with liberals", or participating in "other questionable amusements" as well as requiring "young ladies" to be chaperoned if they venture off-campus. According it its website, the college regards "all forms of homosexuality" as "sinful perversions."

The Hyles-Anderson College operates on explicitly on traditional gender norms, with differential coursework offered to men versus women. The institution offers courses to women like canning and freezing, crock-pot cooking, clothing design and construction, how to rear infants, time management, and programs like Marriage and Motherhood, along with women only degrees like missionary wife, administrative assistant, and "general studies in the department of Bible".

== See also ==
- List of unaccredited institutions of higher learning
- WRTW, "The Key", a Christian radio station licensed to Hyles–Anderson College
- Independent Baptist
