= First Baptist Church (Hammond, Indiana) =

First Baptist Church, Hammond
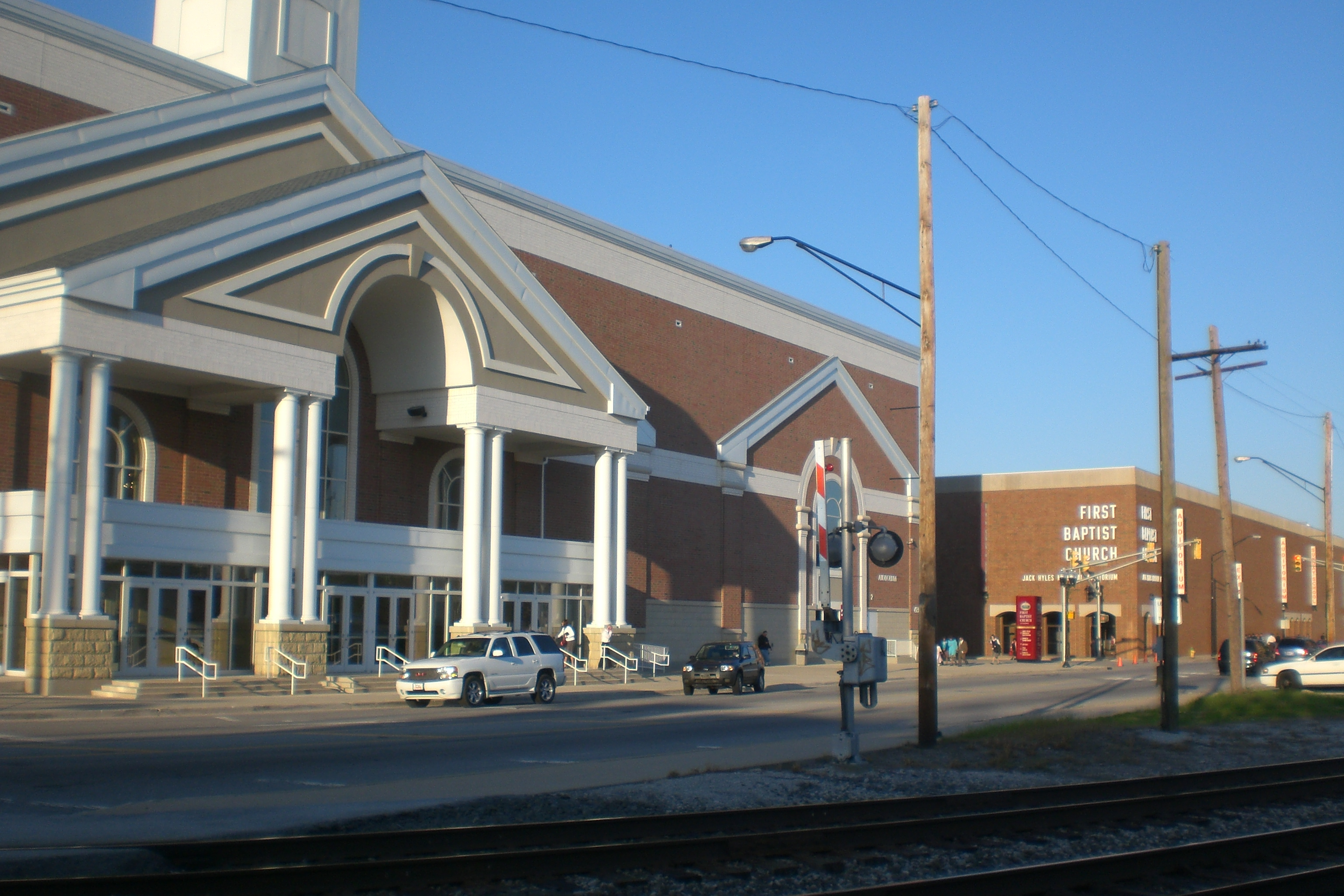
- First Baptist Church, Hammond
- Location: Hammond, Indiana
- Country: United States
- Denomination: Independent Baptist
- Previous denomination: American Baptist
- Website: fbchammond.com

History
- Founded: November 24, 1887
- Founder: Allen Hill

The First Baptist Church of Hammond is an Independent Fundamental Baptist megachurch in Hammond, Indiana, a suburb of Chicago. It is the largest church in the state of Indiana, and in 2007 was the 20th largest in the United States. Though founded in 1887 by Allen Hill, it was under Jack Hyles' leadership from 1959–2001 when it became one of the megachurches in the United States and during the 1970s, had the highest Sunday school attendance of any church in the world. In 1990, the church had a weekly attendance of 20,000. It also operates Hyles-Anderson College, a non-accredited institution established for the training of pastors and missionaries, and two K-12 schools, called 'City Baptist Schools' (for children of the bus route of the church) and 'Hammond Baptist Schools' (for children of the members of the church). John Wilkerson is the senior pastor at First Baptist Church.

Leaders in the church have faced accusations, lawsuits, and convictions for sexual crimes over decades. These in include the Preying from the Pulpit expose in 1993 and the 2013 conviction in federal court of former pastor Jack Schaap of the sexual abuse of a 16-year-old girl.

== History ==
First Baptist Church was founded in November 1887, by Allen Hill of Jennings County, Indiana. Its first meeting was on November 14, 1887, with 12 members on the 28th. However, it originally met in the Morton House Hotel which stood on what is currently the 100 block of Willow Court. Allen Hill's pastorate was short lived at approximately 4 months.

By April 1888, B.P. Hewitt became the church's permanent pastor and Allen Hill went on to start several other churches. Needing more room, Hewitt moved the church's meeting place to the Hohman Opera House at the corner of State and Hohman. In 1889, the church erected its own structure for $2,358 when Marcus Towle, Hammond's first mayor and member of FBC, donated land on Sibley Street to the church.

Subsequently, on January 3, 1901, Pastor E.T. Carter proposed a new building, and the first service was held on April 14, 1901. On November 27 of that same year, Carter announced his resignation for a job at the Central Baptist Orphanage in Michigan.

During the early and mid 1970s the church's Sunday school used carnival-like entertainment along with free transportation by a fleet of over 200 buses to attract thousands of people from the Chicago Southland and northern Indiana. In 1975, the weekly attendance was at 14,000, with a peak of over 30,000 in March of that year. Time magazine described the church's claim of having the "world's largest Sunday school" as "rock solid for the U.S., if not the world."

In January 2013, John Wilkerson became pastor of Hammond, following a January 13, 2013, service with a 94% of the 2,078 members' votes. Wilkerson was previously connected to the church, notably Wilkerson graduated from Hyles-Anderson College in 1989, and his wife Linda graduated in 1990.

== Activities ==
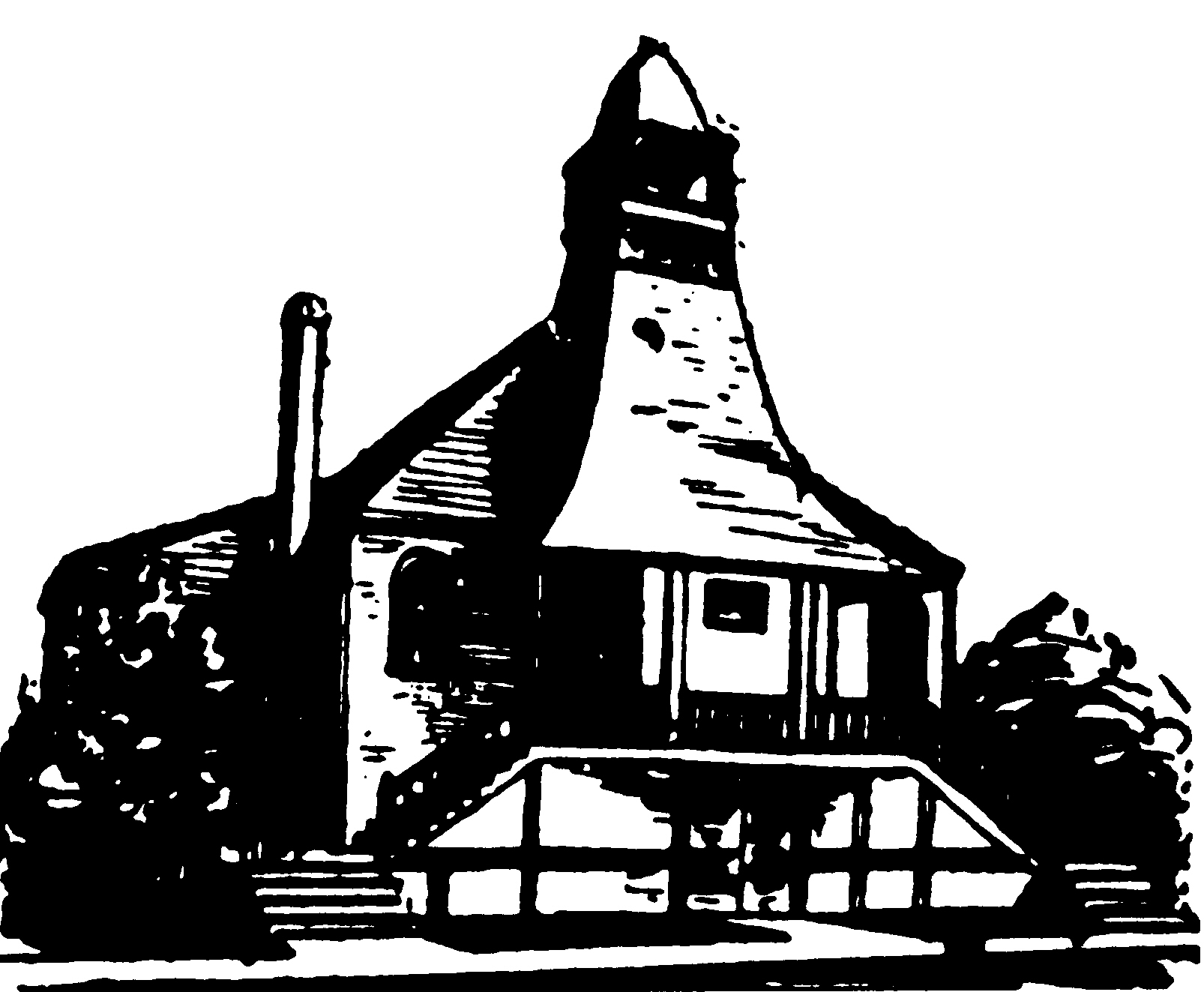
The church in 1889.

First Baptist Church has several outreach ministries, including Prepare Now Resources, Hyles-Anderson College (not accredited by any recognized accreditation body), Fundamental Baptist Missions International, Hammond Baptist Schools, City Baptist Schools, Chicago Baptist Academy, Memory Lane Cemetery, Christian Womanhood Magazine, First Baptist Church Little League, Nursing Home Ministry, Sailor Ministry, Truck Driver's Ministry, Bus Ministry, Blind Ministry, Pathfinder Ministry (Educable Slow), Homeless Ministry, Rescue Mission, Public School Ministry, Inner City Chapel Ministry, and Deaf Ministry. The church also has several services in Spanish and some Asian languages.

First Baptist Church also hosts three national conferences. The first Pastors' School invited pastors, assistant pastors, Christian leaders, school administrators, and Christian laymen to a week of training and learning, and until 2011 was usually held at the end of March. Pastor's school has now been replaced by the Servant's Conference. Youth Conference is held in mid-July and is for the youth pastors and teenagers of Christian churches nationally. The final conference of the year, held every October, is the Christian Womenhood Spectacular for Christian women of all ages. The Church also hosts youth camps and youth revivals.

48th Vice President Mike Pence spoke at the church in September 2011, when he was a member of the U.S. House of Representatives from Indiana.

Every Memorial Day, the church and Hyles-Anderson College students and officials honor veterans of a particular conflict at Memorial Park. In 2008, the group honored those who died in Operation Iraqi Freedom, and in 2009, veterans of the Korean War were honored.

== Controversies ==
In 1989, the paper The Biblical Evangelist published a story "The Saddest Story We Ever Published", accusing Jack Hyles of sexual scandals, financial misappropriation and doctrinal errors. These charges were denied by Hyles who deemed them "lies".

In 1991, a First Baptist Church of Hammond deacon, A.V. Ballenger, molested a 7-year-old girl in her Hammond Sunday school class. During a Sunday school class "a church worker reportedly witnessed the act and removed the girl from the room, police said." The Chicago Tribune in a 1991 article reported that Hyles was sued for $1 million by the parents of the girl. The paper reported the "lawsuit claims Hyles and the church had not fulfilled their obligation to ensure that children were protected from harm during Sunday school." Furthermore, the lawsuit "claims the minister told the child's parents that Ballenger 'just loved children,' and, 'You don't have a case.'" The church settled the lawsuit out of court and the terms were not disclosed. At the criminal trial, three young women testified deacon A.V. Ballenger "had fondled them years ago." One of those girls testified that she was molested on the Hammond church bus. A former security officer at the church testified he saw Ballenger fondle a young girl in 1978 or 1979 in a Sunday school room after being called to the room by a female teacher. In 1993, Ballenger was sentenced to five years in prison.

In 1993, WJBK aired Preying from the Pulpit, a news series, examined "allegations of child molesting, abuse and sex scandals in several churches across the nation appear to be part of a pattern of such scandals among churches affiliated with the First Baptist Church of Hammond." It examined fresh claims of sex abuse in five different fundamentalist churches where church workers who molested children were traced back to Hyles-Anderson College. Besides the abuse, the program examined Hyles' teaching, including a 1990 sermon where "Hyles pretended to pour poison into a glass and asked an associate pastor, Johnny Colsten, to drink from it. Colsten said he would." The report "said the sermon has the 'ring of Jonestown' to it—the mass suicide in Guyana in 1978 by followers of cult leader Jim Jones." Hyles called the program "poor journalism" and organized a national campaign to respond. The Times of Northwest Indiana also condemned WJBK's series, calling it "highly irresponsible" and "a monstrous overreach".

In 1997, Hyles and the First Baptist Church of Hammond were sued "for negligence in connection with alleged sexual assaults on a mentally disabled church member over a six-year period" The lawyer for the woman, Vernon Petri, "says Hyles is a defendant because he failed to protect the woman", such that "controls have to be set to be sure things are conducted appropriately." However, Christianity Today pointed out that no criminal charges were ever filed in the case. Also, Hyles denied the allegations that either he or his church were negligent in the care of the woman in an October 12 advertisement in the Hammond Times. According to the lawyer, "a church program instructor led her to a room and served as a lookout while two to three males raped her." The women developed a "serious" infection and doctors "found, embedded in her, a plastic object." The "civil suit filed in Lake Superior Court in Gary claims the Chicago woman was "induced by agents" of the church in 1991 to ride a bus to attend Sunday." The women and church settled the lawsuit for an undisclosed sum.

After Hyles' death in 2001, Jack Schaap, Hyles' son-in-law, succeeded as pastor. Schaap's sermons were controversial. On July 31, 2012, Schaap was fired "due to a sin that has caused him to forfeit his right to be our pastor". Schaap reportedly admitted to deacons of the church that he had an adulterous affair with the young woman, who was 16 years old at the time. Since 16 is the age of consent in Indiana, sex with the girl would not have constituted statutory rape. The case was turned over to the Lake County Sheriff's Department (Indiana) for investigation.

In September 2012, Schaap was charged in a U.S. District Court for taking a minor across state lines to have sex with her (the Mann Act) and pleaded guilty.

In October, nearly a quarter of the Hammond church staff were laid off. An article in the January 2013 issue of Chicago magazine about First Baptist Church stated, "A string of assaults and sexual crimes committed by pastors across the country have one thing in common: The perpetrators have ties to the megachurch in Hammond, Indiana."

In January 2013, Schaap asked the court for the minimum 10-year sentence, claiming he was under great stress, exhausted and depressed at the time of the relationship. In a sentencing memorandum, prosecutors revealed that Schaap "groomed" the girl, including kissing the victim during counseling and had sex with her in his office. In March 2013, Schaap was sentenced to 12 years in federal prison for having sex with an underage girl.

On May 4, 2022, Schaap was given an early release from incarceration.

In 2023, Joseph Eyer a former deacon, was sentenced to 2 1/2 years for molesting a teenage boy over several years in Gary, Indiana.
