= Hector Honore =

American racing driver

Hector 'Pappy' Honoré
- Born: Hector Victor Honoré Jr. September 9, 1905; Pittsburg, Kansas, U.S.
- Died: March 3, 1983; Pana, Illinois, U.S.
- Occupation: Racecar Owner Mechanic Driver

Hector Victor Honoré Jr. (September 9, 1905 in Pittsburg, Kansas – March 3, 1983 in Pana, Illinois), was an American racecar driver, mechanic and owner.

== Personal history ==
Honore was born the son of a Belgian father a French mother from in Pittsburg, Kansas. Following the death of his father, Hector's mother remarried and the family moved to Christian County, Illinois. They eventually settled in the town of Pana, Illinois where he operated a mechanic shop for several decades. He was married and had three daughters. He was brother-in-law of noted Baptist Evangelist Robert Sumner.

== Racing career ==
After a briefly driving his own cars, Honore focused on being a car owner and mechanic. His sprint car, the "Black Deuce," has won more races than any other sprint car in the history of the sport.

== Sprint Car Season Racing Championships ==
- 1941 - Midwest Dirt Track Racing Association (MDTRA) - Driver: Harold Shaw
- 1946 - Midwest Dirt Track Racing Association (MDTRA) - Driver: Cliff Griffith
- 1947 - Midwest Dirt Track Racing Association (MDTRA) - Driver: Cliff Griffith
- 1955 - International Motor Contest Association (IMCA) - Driver: Bobby Grim
- 1956 - International Motor Contest Association (IMCA) - Driver: Bobby Grim
- 1957 - International Motor Contest Association (IMCA) - Driver: Bobby Grim
- 1958 - International Motor Contest Association (IMCA) - Driver: Bobby Grim
- 1959 - International Motor Contest Association (IMCA) - Driver: Pete Folse Sr.
- 1960 - International Motor Contest Association (IMCA) - Driver: Pete Folse Sr.
- 1961 - International Motor Contest Association (IMCA) - Driver: Pete Folse Sr.

== Honored in Halls of Fame ==
- Inducted into National Sprint Car Hall of Fame & Museum in Knoxville, Iowa in 1991
- Inducted into Highbanks Hall of Fame in Belleville, Kansas in 2001
