= Griffith station (Grand Trunk Western Railroad) =

- Griffith Grand Trunk Depot
- U.S. National Register of Historic Places
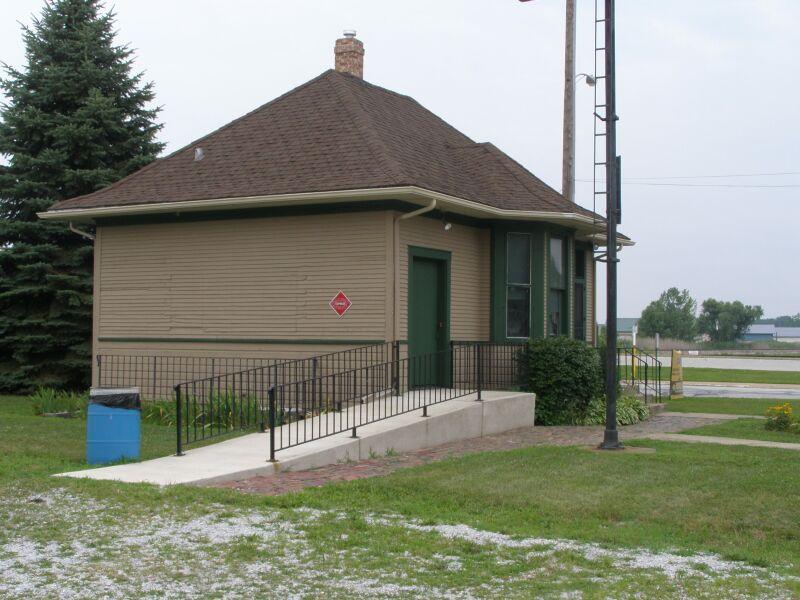
- Grand Trunk Depot Griffith, July 2010

- Location within Indiana Location within the United States
- Location: 201 S. Broad St., Griffith, Indiana
- Coordinates: 41°31′16″N 87°25′39″W
- Area: less than one acre
- Built: 1911
- Built by: Grand Trunk & Western Railroad
- NRHP reference No.: 03000985
- Added to NRHP: September 28, 2003

Griffith Grand Trunk Depot is a historic train station located at Griffith, Indiana. It was built in 1911 by the Grand Trunk Western Railroad. It is a simple one-story, frame building measuring 20 feet by 30 feet. It has a steeply pitched hipped roof with overhanging eaves and a projecting three-sided bay. The depot operated until 1980. It was moved to its present location in the Griffith Historical Park and Railroad Museum in 1980.

It was listed in the National Register of Historic Places in 2003.

Preceding station	Grand Trunk Western Railroad	Following station
Harvey toward Chicago	Main Line	Valparaiso toward Port Huron
Maynard toward Chicago	Suburban Service (Chicago)	Bothwell toward Valparaiso
