= Griffith-Merrillville Airport =

- IATA: none; ICAO: none; FAA LID: 05C

Summary
- Airport type: Public
- Owner: The Gary/Chicago International Airport Authority (2023–present)
- Location: Griffith, Indiana
- Opened: January 1962
- Elevation AMSL: 634 ft (193 m)
- Coordinates: 41°31′11″N 087°23′58″W
- Website: GriffithAirport.com

Map
- Location of airport in Indiana 05C (the United States)

Runways
Direction	Length		Surface
Direction	ft	m	Surface
8/26	4,900	1,494	Asphalt

Statistics
- Aircraft operations (2006): 33,699
- Based aircraft (2015): 71
- Sources: Airport and FAA

Griffith-Merrillville Airport (FAA LID: 05C) is a public-use airport two miles east of Griffith, in Lake County, Indiana, United States. Until 2023, it was privately owned by Griffith Aviation, Inc.

== Facilities ==
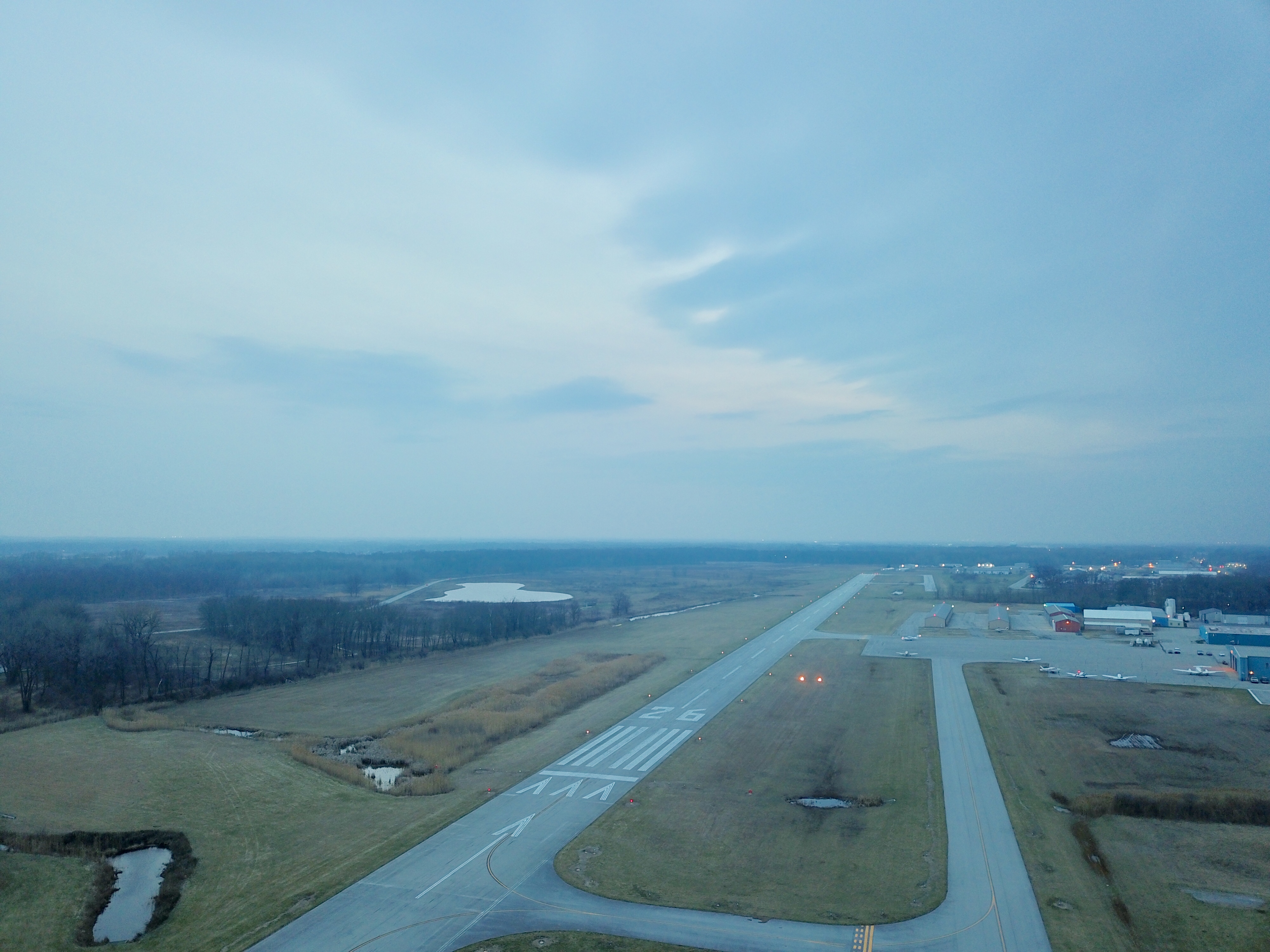
View of Griffith-Merrillville Airport.

The airport covers 122 acres (49 ha) at an elevation of 634 feet (193 m). Its runway, 8/26, is 4,900 by 75 feet (1,494 x 23 m) asphalt. The runway has VOR/DME, GPS Instrument Approaches and Pilot Controlled Lighting.

Airport services include a fixed-base operator (FBO) and flight school from Griffith Aviation, full service maintenance from Great Northern and custom engine overhauls from G & N Aircraft. Both 100LL gas and Jet A fuel are available.

In the year ending August 23, 2006 the airport had 33,699 aircraft operations, average 92 per day: 99% general aviation and 1% air taxi. In 2015, 71 aircraft were based at the airport: 48 single-engine, 15 multi-engine, 1 jet and 7 helicopters.

In December 2023, it was announced that The Gary/Chicago International Airport Authority had acquired the airport previously owned by Griffith Aviation for $1.8 million.

== See also ==
- List of airports in Indiana
