= Robert Sumner =

American author and editor (1922–2016)

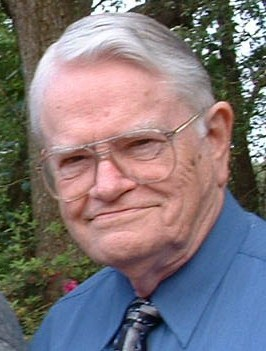
- Sumner in 2003
- Born: August 3, 1922; Norwich, New York, U.S.
- Died: December 5, 2016 (aged 94); Lynchburg, Virginia, U.S.
- Occupation: Baptist Christian Evangelist
- Website: biblicalevangelist.org

Robert L. Sumner (August 3, 1922 – December 5, 2016) was an American Christian author, Baptist pastor, evangelist, and editor of the fundamentalist newspaper called The Biblical Evangelist.

== Background ==
Born to an educated family in Upstate New York he graduated from Norwich High School and Clarks Summit University (formerly Baptist Bible College & Seminary in Johnson City, New York). He also received honorary graduate degrees from Bob Jones University and Louisiana Baptist Theological Seminary in Sacred Theology. He was the brother-in-law of auto racing legend Hector Honore. Sumner died in December 2016 at the age of 94.

== Ministry ==
Sumner was pastor of a number of Baptist churches in Illinois, California, Texas and Ohio. In 1959, he created the non-profit Sumner Evangelistic Foundation. In 1965, he was on the Council of 14 (now Council of 18) of the General Association of Regular Baptist Churches, and he changed the name of his foundation to Regular Baptist Evangelism. In May, 1966, this group launched a newsletter called The Regular Baptist Evangelist, which 9 months later became just The Biblical Evangelist. He has also attended many Christian conferences and lectures. In November, 1980, The Biblical Evangelist stopped publication and Sumner became Managing Editor of a Christian newspaper of (which he had served previously starting in 1954), The Sword of the Lord, which was published by John R. Rice.

In 1982, Sumner left The Sword after a dispute with the editor that was mediated by Jack Hyles. After the ordeal, Sumner complained that he was left "without an editorial voice", so he restarted The Biblical Evangelist by sending letters to former subscribers asking them to resubscribe. Sumner continued as editor of the Biblical Evangelist until 2016, publishing the last edition only two months before he died.

== Hyles exposé ==
In 1989, Sumner received some attention for criticizing Jack Hyles when he wrote a story in The Biblical Evangelist, titled "The Saddest Story I've Ever Told". The article accused Hyles of sexual scandals, financial misappropriation and doctrinal errors. These charges were denied by Hyles who deemed them to be lies. However, in 2012 Hyles's daughter, Linda [Hyles] Murphrey, claimed the charges against her father were true, and that she considered her father the leader of a cult.

== Author ==
Sumner published a total of 43 books including his last, Favorite Editorials, a collection of his favorite editorials from over the years, 304-pages (2015). He is also the official biographer of John R. Rice. The Biblical Evangelist is no longer published, and except for The Saddest Story is no longer available online.

== Bibliography ==
- Favorite Editorials, Robert L. Sumner, Editor—Biblical Evangelism Press (2015) 297 pgs. ISBN 9780914012450
- The Honor Was All Mine—Biblical Evangelism Press (2015) 304 pgs. ISBN 9780914012467
- The Wonder of the Word of God! Revised Edition—Biblical Evangelism Press (2013) 40 pgs.
- Fights I Didn’t Start ... and some I did, Round 2—Biblical Evangelism Press (2011) 262 pgs. ISBN 9780914012467
- Fights I Didn't Start ... and some I did—Biblical Evangelism Press (2009) ISBN 9780914012320
- Jewels from James—Biblical Evangelism Press (2008) 317 pgs. ISBN 0-914012-39-8
- HEBREWS: Streams of Living Water—Biblical Evangelism Press (2003) 546 pgs. ISBN 0-914012-36-3
- "Jesus Christ is God!: an Examination of Victor Paul Wierwille and His "the Way International, " a Rapidly Growing Unitarian Cult—Biblical Evangelism Press (1983) ISBN 0-914012-24-X
- Mormonism—Sword of the Lord Pub. (1981) 47 pgs. ISBN 0-87398-559-1
- Falsities of Seventh-Day Adventism—Sword of the Lord Pub. (1981) ISBN 0-87398-272-X
- After the revival—What?: Searching Sermons for the Saints—Biblical Evangelism Press (1980) 114 pgs. ISBN 0-914012-22-3
- Saved by Grace...for Service!: Evangelistic preaching in Ephesians—Sword of the Lord Pub. (1979) 333 pgs. ISBN 0-87398-797-7
- Bible translations: Is the King James Version the only trustworthy translation? What text is inerrant, infallible, God-breathed? Can we trust any translation? ... is the historic fundamentalist position?—Biblical Evangelism Press (1979) 30 pgs. ISBN 0-914012-20-7
- Powerhouse!—Biblical Evaneglism Press (1978) 203 pgs. ISBN 0-914012-18-5
- Armstrongism: the "Worldwide Church of God" Examined in the Searching Light of Scripture—Biblical Evangelism Press (1974) 424 pgs. ISBN 0-914012-15-0
- An Examination of Tulip: The Five Points of Calvinism—Biblical Evangelism Press (1972) 23 pgs. ISBN 0-914012-13-4
- The Christian who refused to go to church—Biblical Evangelism Press (1971) 31 pgs.
- The Menace of Narcotics—Biblical Evangelism Press (1971) 72 pgs.
- Sumner's Incidents and Illustrations—Biblical Evangelism Press (1969) 480 pgs.
- The Wonder of the Word of God!—Biblical Evangelism Press (1969) 35 pgs.
- Biblical Evangelism in Action—Sword of the Lord Pub (January 1, 1966) 344 pgs. ISBN 0-914012-29-0
- Balaam: the World's First Ecumenical Evangelist—Sword of the Lord Pub. (1964) 24 pgs. ISBN 0-7162-0289-1
- Herbert Armstrong, A False Prophet—Sword of the Lord Pub. (1961) 23 pgs.
- Sin's Surprises!—Sumner Evangelistic Foundation (1961) 23 pgs.
- Evangelism: The Church on Fire—Sword of the Lord Pub. (1960) 220 pgs. ISBN 0-87398-211-8
- Man Sent from God: A Biography of Dr. John R. Rice—Sword of the Lord Pub. (1959) 264 pgs. ISBN 0-87398-550-8
- Hell is No Joke—Sword of the Lord Pub. (1959) 121 pgs.
- The Worst Thing That Can Happen to You -- (1959)
- A Review and Expose of the Interpreter's Bible—Sword of the Lord Pub. (1957) 47 PGS. ISBN 0-87398-405-6
- Hollywood Cesspool: A Startling Survey of Movieland Lives and Morals, Pictures and Results—Sword of the Lord Pub. (1955) ISBN 0-87398-357-2
- The Blight of Booze—Sword of the Lord Pub. (1955) 24 pgs. ISBN 0-87398-063-8
- Separation from Sin and Worldliness—Sword of the Lord Pub. (1955) 30 pgs.
