= Schererville, Indiana =

- Town
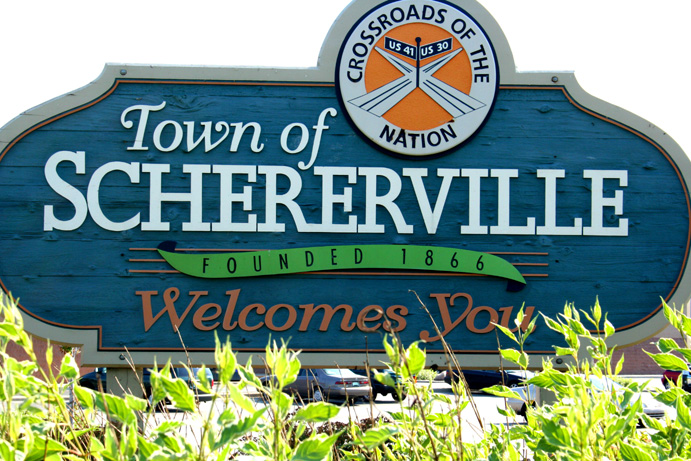

- Logo
- Nicknames: Crossroads of America, The Region
- Location of Schererville in Lake County, Indiana.
- Coordinates: 41°29′21″N 87°26′35″W
- Country: United States
- State: Indiana
- County: Lake
- Townships: St. John, Center
- Founded: 1866
- Incorporated: 1911
- Named for: Nicholas Scherer

Government (update needed)
  - Type: Town
  - Body: Town Council
  - President: Robin Arvanitis (D, 1st)
  - Members: Robin Arvanitis (D, 1st); Kevin Connelly (R, 2nd); Rob Guetzloff (D, 3rd); Tom Schmitt (D, 4th); Caleb S. Johnson (R, 5th)
  - Clerk-Treasurer: Mike Troxell (D)
  - Judge: Randy Wyllie (D)
  - Town Manager: Robert Volkmann

Area
  - Total: 15.15 sq mi (39.23 km^{2})
  - Land: 15.12 sq mi (39.15 km^{2})
  - Water: 0.035 sq mi (0.09 km^{2})
- Elevation: 646 ft (197 m)

Population (2020)
  - Total: 29,646
  - Density: 1,961.3/sq mi (757.26/km^{2})

Standard of living
  - Per capita income: $40,421
  - Median home value: $222,400
- Time zone: UTC−6 (Central)
  - Summer (DST): UTC−5 (Central)
- ZIP code: 46375
- Area code: 219
- FIPS code: 18-68220
- GNIS feature ID: 2396907
- Website: www.schererville.org

Schererville (/ˈʃɛrərvɪl/ SHERR-ər-vil, locally /ˈʃɛərvɪl/ SHAIR-vil) is a town in St. John and Center townships, Lake County, Indiana, United States. The population was 29,646 at the 2020 census It is a suburb of Chicago, located 30 miles south of the city.

== History ==
Long before Indiana became a state, long before the founding of Schererville, people called the area the "Crossroads," as several Native American trails intersected here, that later became routes for the wagons of settlers traveling west.

One of those settlers was Nicholas Scherer, who was born in 1830 at Scheuern, today part of Tholey, Saarland, in southwestern Germany, who arrived in the U.S. in 1846. When he came to this place at the southern tip of Lake Michigan in 1865, he founded the community that bears his name.

Schererville was incorporated as a town in 1911.

Today, trails still cross at Schererville, the modern trails of a motorized society, U.S. Highways 41 and 30. Nearby are newer trails, I-80/94 and I-65. All these are primary transcontinental routes and gives Schererville its slogan: "Crossroads of the Nation."

Schererville's former Town Council President, Perry Ferrini, died on December 13, 2009. The Town Council's new president became Jerry Tippy, and the vacant seat held by Perry was filled by Sharon Moore on January 9, 2010.

The town of Schererville celebrated its sesquicentennial in September 2016.

== Geography ==
Schererville is located at 41°29′21″N 87°26′35″W (41.489135, -87.443137) in Lake County, Indiana. Schererville is 11 miles south of the Lake Michigan shore and 2 miles east of the Indiana/Illinois state line.

Considered part of the Chicago metropolitan area and located just 30 miles from Chicago, Schererville is considered a suburb of this municipality. Many residents commute daily for school and work.

According to the 2010 census, Schererville has a total area of 14.763 square miles (38.24 km^{2}), of which 14.71 square miles (38.10 km^{2}) (or 99.64%) is land and 0.053 square miles (0.14 km^{2}) (or 0.36%) is water.

One of Schererville's neighborhoods, Briar Ridge, spans both Schererville and adjacent Dyer. The ridge south of Route 30 is the Glenwood Shoreline.

== Demographics ==
Historical population
Census	Pop.	Note	%±
1920	483		—
1930	580		20.1%
1940	998		72.1%
1950	1,457		46.0%
1960	2,875		97.3%
1970	3,663		27.4%
1980	13,209		260.6%
1990	19,926		50.9%
2000	24,851		24.7%
2010	29,243		17.7%
2020	29,646		1.4%
Source: US Census Bureau

=== Racial and ethnic composition ===
Schererville town, Indiana – Racial and ethnic composition Note: the US Census treats Hispanic/Latino as an ethnic category. This table excludes Latinos from the racial categories and assigns them to a separate category. Hispanics/Latinos may be of any race.
Race / Ethnicity (NH = Non-Hispanic)	Pop 2000	Pop 2010	Pop 2020	% 2000	% 2010	% 2020
White alone (NH)	21,752	23,411	21,092	87.53%	80.06%	71.15%
Black or African American alone (NH)	520	1,552	2,373	2.09%	5.31%	8.00%
Native American or Alaska Native alone (NH)	24	43	41	0.10%	0.15%	0.14%
Asian alone (NH)	633	813	1,018	2.55%	2.78%	3.43%
Native Hawaiian or Pacific Islander alone (NH)	10	2	12	0.04%	0.01%	0.04%
Other race alone (NH)	21	26	77	0.08%	0.09%	0.26%
Mixed race or Multiracial (NH)	315	298	981	1.27%	1.02%	3.31%
Hispanic or Latino (any race)	1,576	3,098	4,052	6.34%	10.59%	13.67%
Total	24,851	29,243	29,646	100.00%	100.00%	100.00%

=== 2020 census ===
As of the 2020 census, Schererville had a population of 29,646. The median age was 44.5 years. 19.5% of residents were under the age of 18 and 20.7% of residents were 65 years of age or older. For every 100 females there were 91.9 males, and for every 100 females age 18 and over there were 88.7 males age 18 and over.

99.9% of residents lived in urban areas, while 0.1% lived in rural areas.

There were 12,587 households in Schererville, of which 26.2% had children under the age of 18 living in them. Of all households, 49.3% were married-couple households, 16.8% were households with a male householder and no spouse or partner present, and 28.6% were households with a female householder and no spouse or partner present. About 30.5% of all households were made up of individuals and 14.2% had someone living alone who was 65 years of age or older.

There were 13,068 housing units, of which 3.7% were vacant. The homeowner vacancy rate was 0.8% and the rental vacancy rate was 6.8%.

=== 2010 census ===
As of the census of 2010, there were 29,243 people, 11,883 households, and 7,981 families living in the town. The population density was 1,988.0 inhabitants per square mile (767.6/km^{2}). There were 12,393 housing units at an average density of 842.5 per square mile (325.3/km^{2}). The racial makeup of the town was 86.8% White, 5.4% African American, 0.2% Native American, 2.8% Asian, 2.9% from other races, and 1.8% from two or more races. Hispanic or Latino of any race were 10.6% of the population.

There were 11,883 households, of which 29.8% had children under the age of 18 living with them, 53.3% were married couples living together, 9.7% had a female householder with no husband present, 4.2% had a male householder with no wife present, and 32.8% were non-families. 27.7% of all households were made up of individuals, and 9.2% had someone living alone who was 65 years of age or older. The average household size was 2.45 and the average family size was 3.03.

The median age in the town was 40.9 years. 22.1% of residents were under the age of 18; 7.7% were between the ages of 18 and 24; 25.9% were from 25 to 44; 30.3% were from 45 to 64; and 14% were 65 years of age or older. The gender makeup of the town was 48.5% male and 51.5% female.

As of 2010, the median income for a household in the town was $66,160 while the mean income for a household in the town was $77,738. The median income for a family was $84,507 and the mean income for a family was $92,404. The estimated per capita income for the town was $31,983. About 4.3% of families and 7.1% of the population were estimated to be below the poverty line.

=== 2000 census ===
As of the census of 2000, there were 24,851 people, 9,660 households, and 6,829 families living in the town. The population density was 1,825.9 inhabitants per square mile (705.0/km^{2}). There were 10,006 housing units at an average density of 735.2 per square mile (283.9/km^{2}). The racial makeup of the town was 91.45% White, 2.14% African American, 0.11% Native American, 2.56% Asian, 0.04% Pacific Islander, 2.03% from other races, and 1.66% from two or more races. Hispanic or Latino of any race were 6.34% of the population.

There were 9,660 households, out of which 32.6% had children under the age of 18 living with them, 59.0% were married couples living together, 8.3% had a female householder with no husband present, and 29.3% were non-families. 24.2% of all households were made up of individuals, and 6.5% had someone living alone who was 65 years of age or older. The average household size was 2.56 and the average family size was 3.08.

In the town, the population was spread out, with 24.3% under the age of 18, 8.7% from 18 to 24, 30.6% from 25 to 44, 26.1% from 45 to 64, and 10.4% who were 65 years of age or older. The median age was 37 years. For every 100 females, there were 96.7 males. For every 100 females age 18 and over, there were 92.9 males.

The median income for a household in the town was $59,243, and the median income for a family was $70,474. Males had a median income of $50,732 versus $30,745 for females. The per capita income for the town was $28,528. About 1.4% of families and 3.1% of the population were below the poverty line, including 1.9% of those under age 18 and 2.2% of those age 65 or over.

== Education ==
Schererville is served by the Lake Central School Corporation, which also services the adjacent town of Dyer as well as most of St. John and a section of Griffith.

List of schools - Lake Central School Corporation:

- Lake Central High School (St. John)
- Grimmer Middle School
- Kahler Middle School (Dyer)
- Clark Middle School (St. John)
- Peifer Elementary
- Bibich Elementary (Dyer)
- Kolling Elementary (St. John)
- Homan Elementary
- Protsman Elementary (Dyer)
- Watson Elementary
- St. Michael School

Private schools in the town include St. Michael Catholic School, a Roman Catholic school run by the Diocese of Gary and Forest Ridge Academy. The campus of Hammond Baptist Schools, affiliated with the First Baptist Church of Hammond, is also located in Schererville. Other private schools Schererville residents attend include Andrean High School (Merrillville), Bishop Noll Institute (Hammond), St. John Evangelist School (St. John), Illiana Christian High School (Dyer), Marian Catholic High School (Chicago Heights, IL), and Mount Carmel High School (Chicago, IL)

=== Public libraries ===
Lake County Public Library operates the Dyer-Schererville Branch, which also serves Dyer, at 1001 West Lincoln Highway in Schererville.

== Newspaper ==
Schererville is served by The Times of Northwest Indiana, and The Post-Tribune, which is owned by the Chicago Tribune.

== Recreational sports ==
Kids play a variety of activities in both local leagues and club travel leagues.

Lake Central Youth Basketball oversees one of the largest youth basketball programs in the area open to all residents in surrounding communities.

The Schererville Soccer Club is a non-profit organization committed to youth soccer in Northwest Indiana and provides a volunteer led introductory community soccer league for boys and girls ages 4–17 (U6 through REC Plus.)

There is also Lake Central Pop Warner Football for ages 5– 16 years of age offering flag football, tackle football and cheer.

== Transportation ==
Schererville residents and visitors fly via Chicago's O'Hare International or Midway.

The Borman Expressway (I-80/94/US 6), the Indiana Toll Road, Interstate 65, US 12 and US 20 are within a 25-mile (40 km) radius of Schererville.

=== Commuter Rail ===
Schererville is directly south/southeast of the East Chicago South Shore Line station on the Lakeshore Corridor line and directly southeast of two stations on the Monon Corridor line. The Monon Corridor stations are Munster Ridge and Munster/Dyer. They opened to revenue service on March 31, 2026.

== Nickname ==
The town's nickname, "The Crossroads of America," stems from the fact that U.S. Route 41, (stemming from Upper Peninsula Michigan to Miami, Florida) U.S. Route 30, (stemming from Atlantic City, New Jersey to Astoria, Oregon) and the old Lincoln Highway (the east end starting in Times Square and the west end starting in Lincoln Park in San Francisco, CA) intersect in Schererville.

== Notable residents ==
- Lazo Alavanja (born 1977), soccer player
- Tyler Wideman (born 1995), American basketball player in the Israeli National League
