= Jack Hyles =

American pastor, author, and college president

Jack F. Hyles

Senior Pastor of the First Baptist Church of Hammond
- In office 1959 – 2001
- Preceded by: Owen L. Miller
- Succeeded by: Jack A. Schaap

Chancellor of Hyles-Anderson College
- In office 1972 – 2001
- Vice President: Wendall Evans
- Preceded by: Office established
- Succeeded by: Jack A. Schaap

Personal details
- Born: September 25, 1926 Italy, Ellis County, Texas
- Died: February 6, 2001 (aged 74) Hammond, Lake County, Indiana
- Cause of death: Heart failure
- Spouse: Beverly Hyles (m. 1945)
- Children: Four (Dave, Cindy, Linda, Becky)
- Education: East Texas Baptist College (BA); Southwestern Baptist Theological Seminary (MA)
- Occupation: Senior Pastor

Military service
- Allegiance: United States
- Branch/service: United States Army
- Years of service: 1943-1946
- Rank: SGT
- Unit: 82nd Airborne Division

Jack Frasure Hyles (September 25, 1926 – February 6, 2001) was a leading figure in the Independent Fundamental Baptist movement, having pastored the First Baptist Church of Hammond in Hammond, Indiana, from August 1959 until his death. He was well known for being an innovator of the church bus ministry that brought thousands of people each week from surrounding towns to Hammond for services. Hyles built First Baptist up from fewer than a thousand members to a membership of 100,000. In 1993 and again in 1994, it was reported that 20,000 people attended First Baptist every Sunday, making it the most attended Baptist church in the United States. In 2001, at the time of Hyles's death, 20,000 people were attending church services and Sunday school each week.

== Biography ==
=== Early life and beginnings of ministry ===
Hyles was born and raised in Italy, Texas, a small, low-income city in Ellis County, south of Dallas. Hyles often described his less-than-ideal upbringing which, he said, included a distant father. At the age of eighteen, Hyles enlisted in the United States Army and served as a paratrooper with the 82nd Airborne Division during World War II. He and his wife, Beverly, were married during the war.

After the war was over, Hyles completed his college education at East Texas Baptist University (then College) in Marshall, the seat of Harrison County. After his graduation from East Texas, Hyles started preaching at several small Texas churches, whose memberships began to grow. These churches included: Marris Chapel Baptist Church, Bogata, Texas; Grange Hall Baptist Church, Marshall, Texas; and Southside Baptist Church, Henderson, Texas. After receiving his education Hyles pastored at the Miller Road Baptist Church in Garland in Dallas County for about six years. During this time the congregation grew from 44 to 4,000 members. It was during those days that Hyles left the Southern Baptist Convention and became an Independent Fundamental Baptist. Hyles then led Miller Road Baptist Church as an independent preacher for a while.

=== The move to Hammond, Indiana ===
In 1959, Hyles moved to the church-provided parsonage at 8232 Greenwood Avenue, Munster, Indiana, and became the pastor of First Baptist Church of Hammond. When he arrived, the church had a membership of about seven hundred, many from affluent backgrounds. About a third of the members left the church after hearing Hyles's preaching style, which was very different from that to which they had been accustomed. Hyles then led the church to its status as an independent fundamental Baptist church—freeing it from its ties with the American Baptists. Hyles started his bus ministry and soon shepherded the church from a congregation of several hundred to more than 20,000. In the early 1990s a national survey ranked First Baptist as the largest church in the nation, by average weekly attendance figures.

Beginning in 1969, and continuing for several years, First Baptist received recognition for the size of its Sunday School. In 1969, Elmer Towns wrote a book called The Ten Largest Sunday Schools and What Makes Them Grow which analyzed First Baptist's Sunday School. Towns presented a plaque to Hyles in 1971, naming First Baptist Church of Hammond the nation's largest Sunday school. In 1972, and for several years following, Christian Life Magazine proclaimed First Baptist Church of Hammond to have "the world's largest Sunday School".

In 1972, Jack Hyles and Russell Anderson founded Hyles–Anderson College, an unaccredited Bible college, to specialize in training Baptist ministers and Christian school teachers. Hyles–Anderson College never sought accreditation because Hyles insisted school accreditation would undermine his ability to control how the college ought to run.

=== Ministry ===
One of the most notable aspects of Hyles's work is his church bus ministry that he helped innovate. As early as 1975, Time magazine described the phenomenon in an article titled, "Superchurch." The Time article notes that First Baptist Church of Hammond Sunday School, which regularly ran almost 14,000 people, pushed the church to a record attendance of 30,560 on March 16, 1975, thanks to a boisterous contest between two bus route teams. In that year, the First Baptist bus route ministry consisted of 1,000 workers using 230 buses to ferry as many as 10,000 people every Sunday. In 2001, a fleet of over 200 buses was regularly ferrying 7,000 to 15,000 people from all over the area.

Hyles spoke at The Sword of the Lord conferences with John R. Rice and his own annual "Pastor's School". The school continues to attract as many as seven thousand annual visitors to the Hammond area.

Hyles wrote approximately fifty works in his lifetime with over 14 million total copies in circulation, including the popular Is There A Hell?, based on a sermon he preached at a National Sword of the Lord Conference. Another work, Enemies of Soul Winning tackled many issues considered controversial in fundamentalist and evangelical circles, which include the doctrine of repentance, Lordship salvation, and the role of the church in soul winning. The Calvary Contender wrote, "Hyles will be remembered as a one-of-a-kind, ever controversial leader whose ministry touched the lives of multitudes."

Hyles was better known as "Brother Hyles" to his tens of thousands of congregants.

Hyles often held nationwide speaking engagements. In 1984, for instance, he addressed a large gathering in the small city of Snyder, Texas, the seat of Scurry County, hosted by pastor Luther Wallace "Buck" Hatfield (1929–1995) of Faith Baptist Church. Independent Fundamental Baptists from throughout the area, such as Ross J. Spencer from Bethany Baptist Church in Lubbock, organized bus trips to the convention hall in Snyder. Hatfield and Spencer also adapted the bus ministry approach for their congregations.

In his book, Enemies of Soulwinning, Hyles taught that one could not be born again unless the King James Version was used somewhere along the line in that person's life. Hyles taught that the Baptist church started not at Pentecost, but rather in AD 31 when Christ was alive and that the Catholic Church was started by the Emperor Constantine in AD 313.

=== Death ===
On January 30, 2001, Hyles suffered a heart attack; this was followed by a second on February 5, at the outset of more than eight hours of surgery at the University of Chicago Hospital, where Hyles underwent four heart bypasses and two heart valve replacements.

Hyles died on February 6, 2001; a funeral was held at First Baptist Church of Hammond on February 10. Hyles was survived by his wife Beverly, their four children, 11 grandchildren and four great-grandchildren.

== Legacy ==
=== Honors, award, and praise ===
Hyles attracted praise, an honorary doctorate, and other accolades throughout the course of his life; he also was the subject of frequent criticism. The Washington Post compared the "meek" preaching style of Jerry Falwell to the "spit and fire" of Hyles. The Post suggested that after hearing a preacher like Hyles, "you knew that you'd been preached to". Falwell said that "Hyles will be remembered as a leader in evangelism through the local church." Falwell also said, "He inspired me as a young pastor to win others to Christ through Sunday school, the pulpit, and personal witnessing. He made a great contribution to the cause of Christ".

Hyles received an honorary doctorate from Midwestern Baptist College, an unaccredited Bible college in Pontiac, Michigan.

The Chicago Sun Times wrote about Hyles on the occasion of his death, "When he chose the interests of poor, inner-city kids over millionaire church members, they said he'd never keep the doors of his church open." However, Hyles "proved them all wrong. In the process he built one of the largest congregations in the country, a college, six schools, and a vibrant ministry that will now have to survive without him."

Matthew Barnett, while discussing his work at an inner-city Los Angeles ministry, explained how he learned from Hyles. Barnett described Hyles as a tremendous soulwinner and a great influence throughout the Chicago area.

Hyles is honored in Founder's Park at his college, where life-sized statues of Hyles and his widow have been erected.

== Controversies ==
Accusations of improper sexual behavior and financial and emotional abuse are elements of Hyles's legacy. In 1989, the paper The Biblical Evangelist published a story "The Saddest Story We Ever Published", accusing Hyles of sexual scandals, financial misappropriation and doctrinal errors. These charges were denied by Hyles who deemed them "lies". He was accused of a decade long affair with his secretary, Jennie Nischik, who happened to be the wife of a church deacon, Victor Nischik (the couple would later divorce).

In 1991, a First Baptist Church of Hammond deacon named A.V. Ballenger molested a 7-year-old girl in her Hammond Sunday school class. During a Sunday school class "a church worker reportedly witnessed the act and removed the girl from the room, police said." The Chicago Tribune in a 1991 article reported that Hyles was sued for $1 million by the parents of the girl. The paper reported the "lawsuit claims Hyles and the church had not fulfilled their obligation to ensure that children were protected from harm during Sunday school." Furthermore, the lawsuit "claims the minister told the child's parents that Ballenger 'just loved children,' and, 'You don't have a case.'" The church settled the lawsuit out of court and the terms were not disclosed. At the criminal trial, three young women testified deacon Ballenger "had fondled them years ago." One of those girls testified that she was molested on the Hammond church bus. A former security officer at the church testified he saw Ballenger fondle a young girl in 1978 or 1979 in a Sunday school room after being called to the room by a female teacher. In 1993, Ballenger was sentenced to five years in prison.

In 1993 WJBK aired Preying from the Pulpit, a news series. The theme of the series was that "allegations of child molesting, abuse and sex scandals in several churches across the nation appear to be part of a pattern of such scandals among churches affiliated with the First Baptist Church of Hammond." It examined fresh claims of sex abuse in five different fundamentalist churches where church workers who molested children were traced back to Hyles–Anderson College. Besides the abuse, the program examined Hyles's teaching, including a 1990 sermon where "Hyles pretended to pour poison into a glass and asked an associate pastor, Johnny Colsten, to drink from it. Colsten said he would." The report "said the sermon has the 'ring of Jonestown' to it—the mass suicide in Guyana in 1978 by followers of cult leader Jim Jones." Hyles called the program "poor journalism" and organized a national campaign to respond. The Times of Northwest Indiana also condemned WJBK's series, calling it "highly irresponsible" and "a monstrous overreach".

In October 1997, attorney Vernon Petria filed a lawsuit against First Baptist Church of Hammond, accusing the church and its pastor of allowing a woman with an intellectual disability to be sexually assaulted for six years. The civil suit filed in Lake Superior Court in Gary claims the woman was "induced by agents" of the church in 1991 to ride a bus to attend Sunday school at First Baptist and when she was in the care of the church she was sexually assaulted, molested, battered and raped more than once until 1996. Hyles was sued because he and his church "failed in their duty to protect her," Petri said. The lawsuit alleged this was a pattern of assault that can be traced to a Sunday in 1991, when a First Baptist teacher saw someone abusing the woman and reported it to church leaders and police, but the parents were never told and she kept going to church, where she was threatened into silence. The sexual abuse ended when the woman "developed a horrible infection and was taken to a doctor to find out what was wrong," Petri said. "When the doctor couldn't understand where the infection was coming from, she was admitted to a hospital where they found, embedded in her, a plastic object." The woman then told what happened, Petri said, recalling that a church program instructor led her to a room and served as a lookout while two to three males raped her.

In response, Hyles said he would have been the first one to want someone punished for such an act and the church told police about the teacher's report in 1991. He went on to claim "our records show no attendance since 1991" and this "is a total shock to me." The woman and the church eventually settled the lawsuit for an undisclosed amount.

== Family ==
Jack and Beverly Hyles had four children: Dave, Cindy, Linda, and Becky.

After Hyles's death in 2001, Beverly Hyles moved to Texas and served as a Sunday School teacher in the Missions Minded Department Senior Women's Class at the Southern Baptist-affiliated First Baptist Church of Dallas under Pastor Robert Jeffress. Beverly Hyles died at the age of 88 on August 30, 2017.

David Hyles served as the youth pastor at First Baptist in Hammond under the leadership of his father. Upon learning of his son's affairs with multiple women, Hyles recommended David as pastor of Miller Road Baptist in Texas, keeping David out of the public eye. David had multiple affairs with other women while pastoring the church in Texas, before moving to a different state, divorcing his wife, and leaving the ministry.

Cindy Hyles married Jack Schaap, who succeeded Hyles after his death as the senior pastor of First Baptist Church of Hammond. Schaap was embroiled in a major controversy, where he admitted having sexual intercourse with an underage girl and transporting her to do so, across state lines. He was sentenced to 12 years in prison and registered as a sex offender, after which Cindy divorced Jack.

Linda Hyles Murphrey, is a motivational speaker who presented her story titled "From Cult to Courage" at a TEDx event, discussing her hardships as a child of Jack Hyles. She has spoken out against the church Hyles led during his tenure and after his death, and has left the Independent Baptist movement.

== Works by Hyles ==
- Seeing Him Who Is Invisible—Sword of the Lord Publications (1960) ISBN 0-87398-754-3
- How to Boost Your Church Attendance—Zondervan (January 1, 1961)
- Let's Build an Evangelistic Church—Sword of the Lord Publications (1962) ISBN 0-87398-502-8
- Kisses of Calvary and Other Sermons—Sword of the Lord Pub (1965) ISBN 0-87398-479-X
- Sex Education Program in Our Public Schools; What Is Behind It? -- Sword of the Lord Publishers (1969)
- Let's Hear Jack Hyles (Burning Messages for the Saved and Unsaved)—Sword of the Lord Publications (1972) ISBN 0-87398-504-4
- Hyles Church Manual—Sword of the Lord Publications (November 1982) ISBN 0-87398-372-6
- Church Bus Handbook—Hyles–Anderson Publications (1970)
- How to Rear Children—Hyles-Anderson Publications (January 1, 1972) 193 pgs.
- How to Rear Infants—Hyles–Anderson Publications (January 1, 1979) 143 pgs.
- How to Rear Teenagers—Revival Fires! Publishers (January 1, 1998) 155 pgs.
- Blue Denim and Lace—Hyles–Anderson Publications (1972)
- Let's Go Soul Winning—Sword of the Lord Publications (January 1980) ISBN 0-87398-503-6
- Hyles Sunday School Manual—Sword of the Lord Publications (November 1982) ISBN 0-87398-391-2
- The Blood, the Book and the Body—Hyles–Anderson Publications (1992)
- Enemies of Soul Winning—Hyles–Anderson Publications (1993) 148 pgs.
- Please Pardon My Poetry—Hyles–Anderson Publications (January 1, 1976) 123 pgs.
- Logic Must Prove the King James Bible.—Hyles–Anderson Publications
- Is There A Hell?—Hyles–Anderson Publications
- Jack Hyles Speaks on Biblical Separation—Hyles–Anderson Publications (1984) 112 pgs.
- Salvation is more than Being Saved—Hyles–Anderson Publications (1985) 150 pgs.
- Teaching on Preaching—Hyles–Anderson Publications (1986) 153 pgs.
- Grace and Truth—Hyles–Anderson Publications (January 1, 1975) 222 pgs.
- The Miracle of the Bus Ministry—Ray Young Publications (1996)
- Fundamentalism in My Lifetime—Hyles Publications (2002) ISBN 0-9709488-4-0
- What Great Men Taught Me—Berean Publications (2000)
- Truman Dollar, Jerry Falwell, A. V. Henderson, & Jack Hyles Building Blocks of the Faith (Foundational Bible Doctrines, Special Faith Partner Edition)—Fundamentalist Church Publications (1977) ISBN 0-89663-006-4
- Introduction to the Dino J. Pedrone book What is It All About? Sword of the Lord Publications (2000) ISBN 0-87398-932-5
- Introduction to the Beverly Hyles book Woman, the Assembler (Making Your Husband a Leader) Hyles Publications (1995)
