= Griffith, Indiana =

- Town
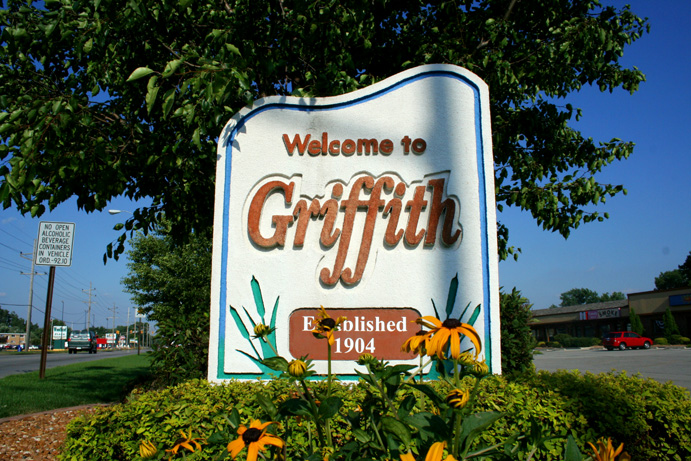

- Logo
- Nickname: The Town That Came to the Tracks
- Location of Griffith in Lake County, Indiana.
- Coordinates: 41°30′51″N 87°24′33″W
- Country: United States
- State: Indiana
- County: Lake
- Townships: North and St. John
- Founded: 1854
- Incorporated: 1904
- Named for: Benjamin Griffith

Government
  - Type: Town
  - Body: Town Council
  - President: Rick A. Ryfa (R, 3rd)
  - Members: James A. Marker (R, 1st) Larry Ballah (R, 2nd) Melissa Robbins (R, 4th) Tony Hobson (R, 5th)
  - Clerk-Treasurer: Gina Smith (R)

Area
  - Total: 7.77 sq mi (20.12 km^{2})
  - Land: 7.77 sq mi (20.12 km^{2})
  - Water: 0 sq mi (0.00 km^{2})
- Elevation: 633 ft (193 m)

Population (2020)
  - Total: 16,528
  - Density: 14,255.9/sq mi (5,504.24/km^{2})

Standard of living (2008-12)
  - Per capita income: $26,548
  - Median home value: $141,600
- Time zone: UTC-6 (Central)
  - Summer (DST): UTC-5 (Central)
- ZIP code: 46319
- Area code: 219
- FIPS code: 18-30042
- GNIS feature ID: 2396979
- Website: griffith.in.gov

Griffith is a town in North and St. John townships in Lake County, Indiana, United States. It is a part of the Chicago metropolitan area. The population was 16,420 in 2020. The town's population is currently declining at a rate of 0.69% annually. Griffith has the 11th largest population and 17th largest area by size of incorporated municipalities in Lake County, Indiana.

== History ==
The town was platted by two brothers, Jay and Elmer Dwiggins, in 1891. The Griffith State Bank, E.J. and E. Griffith Interlocking Tower and Griffith Grand Trunk Depot are listed in the National Register of Historic Places. In 2018, citizens of Griffith voted by a margin of 98% to 2% to leave Calumet Township, in part because of the high property taxes they pay to the township, which also includes Gary, relative to the services received. The town is now part of North Township.

== Geography ==
Griffith is 630 feet (190 m) above sea level. The town's boundaries encompass part of the ancient Calumet shorelines of Lake Michigan. Griffith has a total area of 7.768 square miles (20.12 km^{2}), all land.

Griffith borders the town of Highland to the west, the city of Hammond to the northwest, the city of Gary to the northeast, the town of Schererville to the south, and unincorporated Calumet Township to the east. The small old downtown area of Griffith is located at the intersection of Broad and Main Streets.

== Education ==
Griffith Public Schools, which covers most of the city, operates four local public schools (one high school, one middle school, and two elementary schools).

- Griffith Senior High School (9–12)
- Griffith Middle School (6–8)
- Beiriger Elementary School (3–5)
- Wadsworth Elementary School (K–2)

St. Mary Catholic Elementary & Junior High School is located in Griffith.

Residents who live in the southeastern section of Griffith within the St. John Township are serviced by schools that belong to the Lake Central School Corporation. That district's comprehensive high school is Lake Central High School.

== Demographics ==
Historical population
Census	Pop.	Note	%±
1910	523		—
1920	630		20.5%
1930	1,176		86.7%
1940	2,116		79.9%
1950	4,470		111.2%
1960	9,483		112.1%
1970	18,168		91.6%
1980	17,026		−6.3%
1990	17,916		5.2%
2000	17,334		−3.2%
2010	16,893		−2.5%
2020	16,528		−2.2%
Source: US Census Bureau

=== Racial and ethnic composition ===
Griffith town, Indiana – Racial and ethnic composition Note: the US Census treats Hispanic/Latino as an ethnic category. This table excludes Latinos from the racial categories and assigns them to a separate category. Hispanics/Latinos may be of any race.
Race / Ethnicity (NH = Non-Hispanic)	Pop 2000	Pop 2010	Pop 2020	% 2000	% 2010	% 2020
White alone (NH)	13,738	11,459	9,805	79.25%	67.83%	59.32%
Black or African American alone (NH)	1,734	2,775	2,784	10.00%	16.43%	16.84%
Native American or Alaska Native alone (NH)	42	38	18	0.24%	0.22%	0.11%
Asian alone (NH)	136	121	135	0.78%	0.72%	0.82%
Native Hawaiian or Pacific Islander alone (NH)	5	4	1	0.03%	0.02%	0.01%
Other race alone (NH)	17	16	59	0.10%	0.09%	0.36%
Mixed race or Multiracial (NH)	201	232	662	1.16%	1.37%	4.01%
Hispanic or Latino (any race)	1,461	2,248	3,064	8.43%	13.31%	18.54%
Total	17,334	16,893	16,528	100.00%	100.00%	100.00%

=== 2020 census ===
As of the 2020 census, Griffith had a population of 16,528. The median age was 37.9 years. 21.5% of residents were under the age of 18 and 14.8% were 65 years of age or older. For every 100 females, there were 93.4 males, and for every 100 females age 18 and over, there were 90.9 males.

100.0% of residents lived in urban areas, while 0.0% lived in rural areas.

There were 6,846 households in Griffith, of which 29.7% had children under the age of 18 living in them. Of all households, 40.4% were married-couple households, 21.1% were households with a male householder and no spouse or partner present, and 30.4% were households with a female householder and no spouse or partner present. About 29.6% of all households were made up of individuals, and 9.9% had someone living alone who was 65 years of age or older.

There were 7,260 housing units, of which 5.7% were vacant. The homeowner vacancy rate was 1.1%, and the rental vacancy rate was 8.5%.

=== 2010 census ===
As of the 2010 census, there were 16,893 people, 6,668 households, and 4,559 families residing in the town. The population density was 2,185.4 inhabitants per square mile (843.8/km^{2}). There were 7,070 housing units at an average density of 914.6 per square mile (353.1/km^{2}). The racial makeup of the town was 75.8% White, 16.9% African American, 0.3% Native American, 0.8% Asian, 3.9% from other races, and 2.4% from two or more races. Hispanic or Latino of any race were 13.3% of the population.

Of the 6,668 households, 34.6% had children under the age of 18 living with them, 44.6% were married couples living together, 17.7% had a female householder with no husband present, 6.1% had a male householder with no wife present, and 31.6% were non-families. 26.3% of all households were made up of individuals, and 7.6% had someone living alone who was 65 years of age or older. The average household size was 2.53 and the average family size was 3.06.

The median age in the town was 39 years. 19.4% of residents were under the age of 18; 9.3% were between the ages of 18 and 24; 28.8% were from 25 to 44; 27.4% were from 45 to 64; and 15% were 65 years of age or older. The gender makeup of the town was 47.6% male and 52.4% female.

=== 2000 census ===
As of the 2000 census, there were 17,334 people, 6,728 households, and 4,749 families residing in the town. The population density was 2,417.7 inhabitants per square mile (933.5/km^{2}). There were 6,990 housing units at an average density of 974.9 per square mile (376.4/km^{2}). The racial makeup of the town was 84.01% White, 10.11% African American, 0.35% Native American, 0.81% Asian, 0.04% Pacific Islander, 2.86% from other races, and 1.83% from two or more races. Hispanic or Latino made up 8.43% of the population.

Of the 6,728 households, 33.9% had children under the age of 18 living with them, 54.3% were married couples living together, 12.0% had a female householder with no husband present, and 29.4% were non-families. 25.0% of all households were made up of individuals, and 8.0% had someone living alone who was 65 years of age or older. The average household size was 2.57 and the average family size was 3.10.

In the town, the population was spread out, with 25.5% under the age of 18, 9.2% from 18 to 24, 31.7% from 25 to 44, 22.7% from 45 to 64, and 10.8% who were 65 years of age or older. The median age was 36 years. For every 100 females, there were 94.0 males. For every 100 females age 18 and over, there were 91.9 males.

The median income for a household in the town was $50,030, and the median income for a family was $57,090. Males had a median income of $44,817 versus $27,036 for females. The per capita income for the town was $21,866. About 2.7% of families and 3.9% of the population were below the poverty line, including 3.9% of those under age 18 and 3.1% of those aged 65 and over.

== Transportation ==
Gary/Chicago International Airport in Gary is Griffith's nearest commercial airport.

- 05C - Griffith-Merrillville Airport, (generally known locally simply as “Griffith Airport”) is a smaller airport within the boundaries of the Town of Griffith.

Cline Avenue runs through Griffith north to East Chicago. Interstate 65, The Borman Expressway, The Indiana Toll Road US 30 and US 41 are all short drives from Griffth.

The closest Amtrak station is Dyer station, while the closest South Shore Line station is East Chicago station.

Broad Street, the major north–south road through Griffith, used to be designated Indiana State Route 73. It was what has come to be called a "feeder road," connecting US 6 at the north end to US 30 at the southern end, and at the southern end of the downtown area crossed over the six intersecting rail lines' 13 tracks, creating what was known for a time as the busiest railroad crossing in the country. SR 73 was the shortest state route in Indiana, and was the only Indiana state route to exist in only one town. Technically, a part of it straddled the border between St. John township and Schererville, but since the entire right of way did not reside in either, that part which did lie entirely within the borders of any designated area, were only in Griffith, and hence the appellation stuck. As the railroad traffic decreased and truck traffic increased US 30 was moved south to its present divided 4 lane route, and the old road became known as "Old US 30," Joliet Road, and SR 330. Also, US 6 was removed from its route along Ridge Road at the northern terminus of SR 73 to the Borman Expressway. Its importance diminished and its major connections removed, the Indiana legislature felt that a road that lay entirely within a single town (or at least did not have a portion that sat entirely in another town), should not be provided state funding as its primary source of upkeep. As such, SR 73 was decommissioned as an Indiana state route on September 26, 1969.
