= Hobart Airport (disambiguation) =

Hobart Airport may refer to:

- Hobart Airport in Hobart, Tasmania, Australia (IATA: HBA)
- Hobart Municipal Airport in Hobart, Oklahoma, United States (FAA/IATA: HBR)
- Hobart Sky Ranch Airport in Hobart, Indiana, United States (FAA: 3HO)
