= List of United States post office murals in Indiana =

Following is a list of United States post office murals created in Indiana between 1934 and 1943.

Location	Mural title	Image	Artist	Date	Notes	NRHP listed
Alexandria	The Sleighing Party		Roland Schweinsburg	1938		
Angola	Hoosier Farm		Charles Campbell	1937	on display at Steuban County Community Center	
Attica	Trek of the Covered Wagon to Indiana		Reva Jackman	1938		1988
Aurora	Down to the Ferry		Henrik Martin Mayer	1938		
Batesville	Building the Industrial Foundation of Batesville		Orville Carroll	1938		
Boonville	Boonville Beginnings		Ida Abelman	1941	casein tempera on canvas	
Cambridge	Pride Of Cambridge City		Samuel F. Hershey	1941		
Crawfordsville	Indiana Agriculture		Frank Long	1942		
Crown Point	From Such Beginnings Sprang the County of Lake Indiana		George Melville Smith	1938		
Culver	The Arrival of the Mail in Culver		Jessie Hull Mayer	1938		
Danville	Filling the Water Jugs at Haymaking Time		Gail W. Martin	1939		
Dunkirk	Preparations for Autumn Festival, Dunkirk		Frances Foy	1941		
Franklin	Local Industry		Jean Swiggett	1940		
Garrett	Clearing the Right of Way		Joseph H. Cox	1938	oil on canvas	
Gas City	Gas City in Boom days		William A. Dolwick	1939		
Hobart	Early Hobart		William A. Dolwick	1938		
Indianapolis	Suburban Street		Alan Tompkins	1942	oil on canvas	
Jasper	Indiana Farming Scene in Late Autumn		Jessie Hull Mayer	1939		
Knightstown	The Evening Mail		Raymond L. Morris	1938		
Lafayette	Rural Delivery		Henrik Martin Mayer	1936	oil on canvas	
Lafayette	Sad News		Henrik Martin Mayer	1936	oil on canvas	
LaGrange	The Corn School		Jessie Hull Mayer	1941	oil on canvas	
Liberty	Animal Fields		Avery F. Johnson	1939	oil on canvas	
Ligonier	Cutting Timber		Fay E. Davis	1940	oil on canvas	
Martinsville	The Arrival of the Mail		Alan Tompkins	1937		
Middlebury	Early Middlebury Mail		Raymond Redell	1939		
Monticello	Haymaking		Marguerite Zorach	1942		
Nappanee	Waiting for the Mail		Grant Christian	1938		
North Manchester	Indiana Farm – Sunday Afternoon		Alan Tompkins	1938	oil on canvas	
Paoli	Rural Mail Carriers		Tom Rost	1939	oil on canvas	
Pendleton	Loggers		William F. Kaeser	1939	oil on canvas	
Rensselaer	Receiving the Mail on the Farm		John E. Costigan	1939	oil on canvas	
Rockville	Landscape		Milton Avery	1939	oil on canvas	
Spencer	Harvesting		Joseph Meert	1940	tempera and oil on canvas; winner of the 48-State Mural Competition	
Terre Haute	Magna Carta – Through This Document Government Exists According to Law not Power		Frederick Webb Ross	1935	on display at Indiana State University College of Business	
Tipton	Indiana Farming		Donald Mattison	1937	oil on canvas	
Union City	Country Cousins		Donald Mattison	1938	oil on canvas	
