= Emil Uremovich =

American football player (1916–1994)

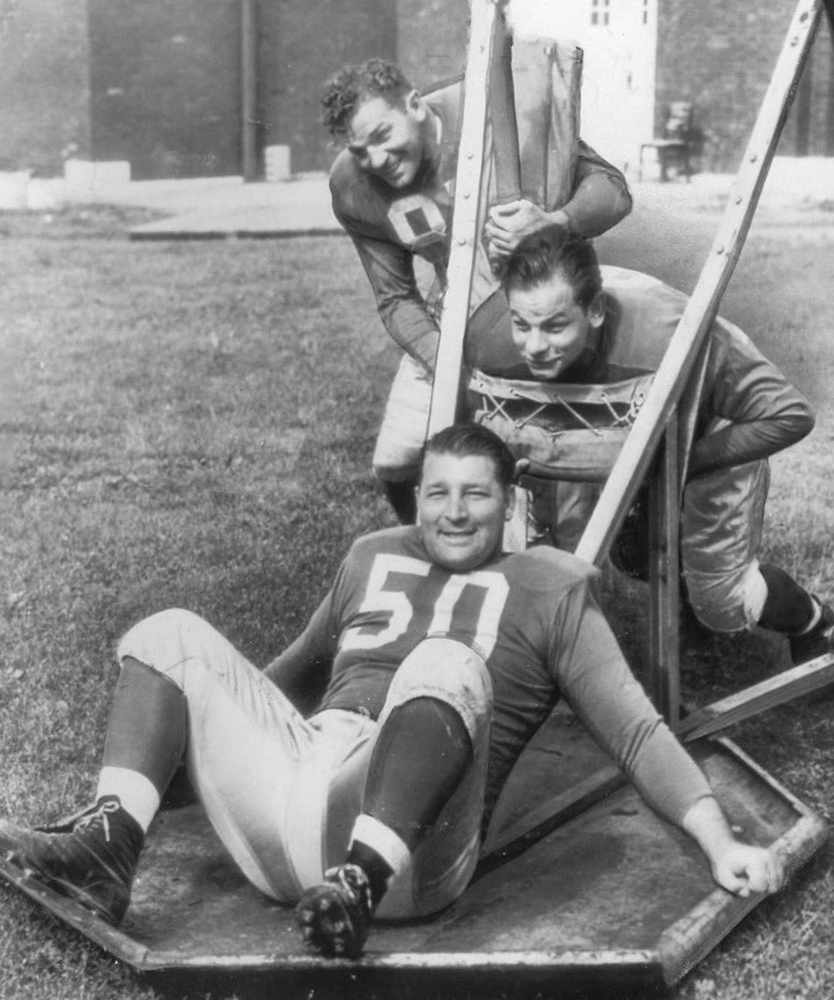
- Uremovich (top) in 1946

No. 75, 81, 44
- Positions: Tackle, defensive end, end

Personal information
- Born: September 29, 1916; Gary, Indiana, U.S.
- Died: April 22, 1994 (aged 77); Knox, Indiana, U.S.
- Listed height: 6 ft 2 in (1.88 m)
- Listed weight: 233 lb (106 kg)

Career information
- High school: Hobart (Hobart, Indiana)
- College: Indiana
- NFL draft: 1941: 11th round, 93rd overall pick

Career history
- Detroit Lions (1941–1942, 1945–1946); Chicago Rockets (1948)

Career NFL statistics
- Games played: 40
- Games started: 25
- Fumble recoveries: 6
- Stats at Pro Football Reference

Emil P. Uremovich (September 26, 1916 – April 22, 1994) was an American professional football lineman for the Detroit Lions of the National Football League (NFL) and the Chicago Rockets of the All-America Football Conference (AAFC). He was selected by the Pittsburgh Steelers in the 11th round of the 1941 NFL draft.
