= Hobart Nature District =

Protected area in Hobart, Indiana, United States

Coordinates: 41°32′04″N 87°17′33″W

- Hobart Marsh Area
- Wayfinding signage entering the district
- Interactive map of Hobart Nature District
- Location: Lake County, Indiana, United States
- Nearest city: Hobart, Indiana

The Hobart Nature District is located in the city of Hobart, Indiana and includes over 1,000 acres (400 ha) of scenic parks, wetlands and floodplains, winding rivers, peaceful lakes, open prairies, oak savannas, old-growth forests, and undulating ravines.

The name of the Hobart Nature District was officially established by resolution of the Common Council of the City of Hobart, Indiana on July 19, 2017, but the natural areas within the district have been in various states of accessibility and restoration for decades. The resolution by the City Council affirmed the phrase "Hobart Nature District" was the best way to refer to all of the areas contained within the Hobart Marsh Plan which was established by the city in 2013.

The concept behind the Hobart Marsh Plan, which contains the areas now referred to as the Hobart Nature District, has been to capitalize on the extensive areas of native prairie, wetlands and woodlands creating a unique attraction for passive recreation enabling visitors the opportunity to experience local flora and fauna. The Hobart Marsh Plan has sought to connect numerous conservation lands managed by various local partner organizations. It also builds upon the growing regional bike trail network with the potential to become an eco-tourism destination, providing access to many other natural and cultural attractions in the region.

The Hobart Marsh area has been cited as a critical habitat for nine state threatened or rare plant species, Blanding's turtle (state endangered), over 40 state endangered, threatened and rare insect species, four state endangered bird species, and five high quality natural communities.

While the phrasing "Hobart Nature District" only became official as of 2017, following the amendment of the Comprehensive Plan for the City of Hobart to include the Hobart Marsh Plan in 2013, conservation efforts and the early steps toward establishment of natural areas within the district date back to as early as 1989 when official support first began to formulate for the preservation of these special places. That initial support led to the establishment of the "Hobart Prairie Grove" that was added to the National Park System as part of a 1992 expansion of Indiana Dunes National Lakeshore (renamed the Indiana Dunes National Park in 2019).

== History ==
=== 1980s ===
1988

- In 1988 Tom Post, with the Indiana Department of Natural Resources (DNR), Division of Nature Preserve, visited a property that would later in1996 be officially named McCloskey Burr Oak Savanna. Prior to the visit by Tom Post of the Indiana DNR, Terry McCloskey found out that there was going to be a timber harvest at the property and along with his father, Raymond McCloskey, purchased the properly to keep it from being logged. After visiting the property Mr. Tom Post began the process of recommending the property be purchased by the Indiana DNR and dedicated as a nature preserve to protect the mesic savanna natural community.

1989

- Hobart Mayor Margaret Kuchta testified in support of adding the Hobart Prairie Grove as a part of the National Park system during hearings on a bill submitted by Congressman Pete Visclosky in 1989. The Hobart City Council also passed a resolution endorsing the proposal.
- David Canright of the Sierra Club Hoosier Chapter presented written testimony dated September 27, 1989 to the Senate Subcommittee on Public Lands, National Parks, and Forests in support of S.2882, a Bill to Enhance The Indiana Dunes National Lakeshore, that cites the importance of including Hobart Prairie Grove in the expansion.

=== 1990s ===
1990

- Hobart Mayor Margaret Kuchta sent a letter to Senator Dale Bumpers, Chairman of the Subcommittee on Public Lands and signed a proclamation on September 5, 1990, from the Office of the Mayor in support of the Hobart Prairie Grove. The proclamation phrasing noted the Hobart Prairie Grove as a "unique area containing rare and threatened or endangered species" and "preservation of this beautiful natural area will add an important cultural resource to enhance the strength and value of the Hobart community." It further noted, "members of the City Council of Hobart, Indiana are in favor of including the Hobart Prairie Grove in the Indiana Dunes National Lakeshore" and proclaimed the City of Hobart's "support of the Hobart Prairie Grove in the Dunes National Lakeshore expansion bill."
- Senator Dan Coats spoke and submitted a prepared statement in the United States Senate during the second session of the 101st Congress where he noted the significance of the Hobart Prairie Grove as one of the "few remaining unspoiled prairie forests in the midwest" containing rare plants and wildlife.
- A letter of support was written by local ecologist Sandy O'Brien to be included as part of the record of testimony on S 2882, the Indiana Dunes National Lakeshore Access and Enhancement Act. The letter was addressed to the Honorable Dale Bumpers, Chairman of the Subcommittee on Public Lands, National Parks and Forests as part of the Senate Committee on Energy and Natural Resources. The letter provided detailed information relating the geological relationship to the dunes, the ecological quality, and plant diversity found at the Hobart Prairie Grove.
- A letter of support was written by Kim Klimek, president of the Deep River Nature Society, to be included as part of the record of testimony on S 2882, the Indiana Dunes National Lakeshore Access and Enhancement Act. In the letter she noted the Hobart Prairie Grove was of National Park Service quality, having been surveyed by several botanists including Dr. Gerould Wilhelm who had done major botanical surveys of all the Lakeshore units and John Bacone, Director of Indiana's Department of Natural Resources. The Hobart Prairie Grove was noted as being the largest and best tallgrass savanna remnant in Indiana and the last chance to preserve the natural heritage according to experts. It letter also noted adjacent wetlands were evaluated by the Indiana Department of Natural Resources and rated in the 1979 Technical Report No. 303 as #1 priority for acquisition in the Lake Michigan watershed.
- In November 1990, the property now known as the McCloskey Burr Oak Savanna was purchased by the Indiana Department of Natural Resources from the McCloskey family. The property would later take its official name officially be dedicated as a State of Indiana nature preserve later in December 1996.

1991

- Legislation sponsored by Congressman Pete Visclosky was approved by the U.S. House Committee on Interior and Insular Affairs that would expand the Indiana Dunes National Lakeshore. The legislation would direct the National Park Service to purchase 11 tracts of land in Lake, Laporte, and Porter counties, including the acres known as Hobart Prairie in Hobart.
- Indiana Senators Richard Lugar and Dan Coats introduce a bill to expand the Indiana National Lakeshore which include the Hobart Prairie Grove.
- An Indiana Dunes Coalition newsletter described the Hobart Prairie Grove as tallgrass savanna that was once common to the area but now so rare it was thought to be extinct.

1992

- Congress passed Public Law 102-430 adding Hobart Prairie Grove to the National Park System as part of a 1992 expansion of Indiana Dunes National Lakeshore (renamed the Indiana Dunes National Park in 2019).

1996

- On December 19, 1996, the property purchased by the Indiana Department of Natural Resources from the McCloskey family in November 1990 was officially named the McCloskely's Burr Oak Savanna Nature Preserve and dedicated as a State of Indiana nature preserve. The articles of dedication were signed by Michael J. Kiley, chairman of the State of Indiana Natural Resources Commission and Patrick R. Ralson, director of the Indiana Department of Natural Resources.

1997

- On January 27, 1997, Indiana Governor Frank O'Bannon signed the Articles of Dedication for the McCloskey's Burr Oak Savanna Nature Preserve.
- On February 27, 1997, a Master Plan for the McCloskey's Burr Oak Savanna Nature Preserve was filed with the Lake County Auditor. The plan provides details about the management of the property and explains how the property should be used, aligned with the purposes in the Natural Preserves Act of the State of Indiana.
- The General Management Plan published by the Indiana Dunes National Lakeshore indicates the Hobart Prairie Grove is primarily a black soil savanna with significant acreage of prairie and wetlands. It also notes a section of abandoned Elgin Joliet and Eastern Railroad right-of-way is being developed as a hike/bike trail by the Lake County Parks Department that could provide access to the site with minimal impact.

1999

- Restoration work began at Spangler Fen, later renamed Greiner Nature Preserve by the Shirley Heinze Land Trust, in 1999 with removal of glossy buckthorn. Subsequent work focused on control of additional invasive species such as multiflora rose, bush honeysuckle, reed canary grass, and cattails.

=== 2000s ===
2000

- Shirley Heinze Land Trust began managing their Bur Oak Woods nature preserve located on the east side of Liverpool Road, north of Crabapple Lane in Hobart, IN. The initial management largely focused on control of invasive shrubs until 2008, when a large-scale savanna restoration project would begin.

2001

- In June 2001 Shirley Heinze Land Trust began managing their Hidden Prairie property located west of I-65 at the corner of 41st Avenue and Missouri Street in Hobart. Management involved the removal of bush honeysuckle, multiflora rose and dogwood shrubs to expand a small prairie opening.

2002

- Controlled burns were conducted in the fall of 2002 by Shirley Heinze Land Trust at their Bur Oak Woods nature preserve located on the east side of Liverpool Road, north of Crabapple Lane in Hobart, IN.
- In 2002 Shirley Heinze received a $2,000 Environmental Challenge Grant from NIPSCO for an upland prairie restoration project at their Spangler Fen property (later renamed Greiner Nature Preserve). Work focused on removal of non-native species and native prairie seed mix planting in a two-acre parcel at the north entrance to the fen.

2003

- Controlled burns were conducted in the spring of 2003 by Shirley Heinze Land Trust at their Hidden Prairie property located west of I-65 at the corner of 41st Avenue and Missouri Street in Hobart.

2004

- The Trust for Public Land, a national nonprofit conservation organization, announced that 219 acres of farmland would be restored to its condition prior to the arrival of the first settlers in Northwest Indiana. This includes 46 acres next to the Hobart Prairie Grove and 173 acres of adjoining farmland and burr oak groves that add to the existing public land in and around the Hobart Marsh region.

2005

- The Trust for Public Land announced their multi-year project to protect and save nearly 400 acres in and around Hobart was complete. The area known as Hobart Marsh was a result of a long-term cooperative effort that involved Congressman Pete Visclosky, the Trust for Public Land, the U.S. Army Corps of Engineers, the Indiana Department of national Resources, the Little Calumet River Basin Development Commission, local officials and local conservation leaders.
- Parts of the Hobart Prairie Grove located within the Hobart Marsh area were described as an overgrown oak savanna and as an early successional mesic forest containing maple hickory and oak by publication detailing the Fire Management Plan for the Indiana Dunes National Lakeshore.

2006

- Field notes from the U.S. Fish and Wildlife Service note that some tracts within the area known as the Hobart Marsh contain trees that may date back 200 years.

2007

- Controlled burns were conducted in the spring of 2007 by Shirley Heinze Land Trust at their Hidden Prairie property located west of I-65 at the corner of 41st Avenue and Missouri Street in Hobart.

2008

- Controlled burns were conducted in the spring of 2009 by Shirley Heinze Land Trust at their Spangler Fen property (later renamed Greiner Nature Preserve).
- Shirley Heinze Land Trust began a large-scale savanna restoration project in their Bur Oak Woods nature preserve located on the east side of Liverpool Road, north of Crabapple Lane in Hobart, IN. The project was funded by grants from Northern Indiana Public Service Company (NIPSCO), USFWS and Chicago Wilderness. The project utilized a large brushhog to mechanically clear brush and undesirable trees. This was followed by herbicide treatments of resprouts, a controlled burn, and planting of a native seed mix.

2009

- Controlled burns were conducted in the spring of 2009 by Shirley Heinze Land Trust at their Bur Oak Woods nature preserve located on the east side of Liverpool Road, north of Crabapple Lane in Hobart and at their Hidden Prairie property located west of I-65 at the corner of 41st Avenue and Missouri Street in Hobart.
- Shirley Heinze Land Trust secured grant funding in 2009 from the Arcelor Mittal Sustain Our Great Lakes Program to expand the project to restore approximately 45 acres of overgrown bur oak savanna in their in their Bur Oak Woods nature preserve located on the east side of Liverpool Road, north of Crabapple Lane in Hobart, IN.
- Shirley Heinze Land Trust (SHLT) received a $25,000 grant from USFWS in 2009 that allowed SHLT to return an additional 14 acres of former cropland in the southern end of the Spangler Fen property (later renamed Greiner Nature Preserve) to prairie.
- Robinson Lake Park, owned by the City of Hobart and located near the center of the Hobart Marsh Area, became the focus of public attention when a private developer sought to acquire the Robinson Lake Park property from the city. A grassroots efforts among community members opposing any sale of the park property formed a non-profit group known as The Friends of Robinson Lake with the mission is to preserve the natural beauty of the park, protect it as a public park, and promote awareness of park activities. The developer ultimately did not seek further action with regard to acquiring the park from the city citing negative response from city officials and also cited influence by the citizens group the Friends of Robinson Lake for their continued protest to the private ownership of Robinson Lake.
- A September 2009 National Park Service Vegetation Inventory Program of the Indiana Dunes National Lakeshore included descriptions of the Hobart Prairie Grove which is located with the Hobart Marsh area of Hobart, Indiana. The report noted Hobart Prairie Grove provides a small remnant bluff prairie, and mostly a mosaic of oak savanna, woodland, and forest.
- On October 2, 2009, the nature preserve known as Spangler Fen, located southwest of the intersection of Liverpool Road and Old Ridge Road in Hobart, south of Ridgeview Elementary School, was renamed Greiner Nature Preserve by the Shirley Heinze Land Trust in honor Gordon and Faith Greiner at a ceremony where some 60 supporters gathered for the group's annual donor appreciation hike.

=== 2010s ===
2011

- Controlled burns were conducted in the spring of 2011 by Shirley Heinze Land Trust at their Greiner and Hidden Prairie properties within the Hobart Nature District.
- The City of Hobart identified a need to develop a plan for the area on the west side of the city where numerous organizations including the U.S. Army Corps of Engineers, City of Hobart, Indiana Department of Natural Resources, NIPSCO, and Shirley Heinze Land Trust, own and manage conservation lands. With the need established the city was able to secure a grant from the Indiana Department of Natural Resources Lake Michigan Coastal Program to create a comprehensive plan and implementation strategy that would be known as the Hobart Marsh Area Plan. The project cost for development of the plan was $22,920 ($11460 Lake Michigan Coastal Grant/$11,460 Local Match).
- The City of Hobart Parks and Recreation Department published their Master Plan in 2011 and mentioned Robinson Lake Park and its importance in relation to hundreds of acres owned by the Indiana Department of National Resources within the area that had commonly been referred to as the Hobart Marsh. The Master Plan noted, "Robinson Lake is in the epicenter of 355 acres of DNR property. The property will be commencing wetland remediation in 2011 forward. The Planning Department is in the process of securing a grant that will study and formalize a plan for this sub-area of the city, with Robinson Lake being the focus." The Master Plan further noted among long-range plan relating to the assessment of needs for City of Hobart Parks and Recreation through the year 2020 should include, "Consider purchasing additional property north of Robinson Lake for future development."
- The Long-range Interpretive Plan published by the Indiana Dunes National Lakeshore in March 2011 indicated the Hobart Prairie Grove, located within the Hobart Marsh area, was one of several sites with almost no visitor amenities and little interpretation. The report targeted mid-term 2014-2016 goal tasks to include enhancing interpretive signage at Hobart Prairie Grove to include restoration progress with other interpretive content.

2012

- The Hobart Prairie Grove, located in the Hobart Marsh area, was included in a study by the Indiana Dunes National Lakeshore with details published in the Final White-Tailed Deer Management Plan / Environmental Impact Statement.
- The City of Hobart Parks Department entered into an agreement in 2012 with the Indiana Department of Natural Resources to manage the fish population in Robinson Lake located at Robinson Lake Park which is centrally located within the area known as Hobart Marsh. The state agency does periodic stocking and makes recommendations concerning the lake at no cost to the city.
- Fifth grade students from Ridge View Elementary School in Hobart, Indiana work with Shirley Heinze Land Trust at the Greiner Nature Preserve within the Hobart Marsh Area as part of the Might Acorns Program to collect seeds from native species for future planting.

2013

- Shirley Heinze Land Trust organized a volunteer work day at their Bur Oak Woods nature preserve within the Hobart Marsh Area as part of ongoing efforts for more than five years of restoration work at the site. The 84-acre remnant bur oak savana is noted as being one of the rarest habitat types found in Indiana. Some of the trees are more than four feet in diameter and among some of the only remaining old growth trees in Lake County, Indiana.
- The final version Hobart Marsh Plan was presented to the Common Council of the City of Hobart, Indiana for consideration. Among the intentions noted were for it to contain hiking and biking trails, trail heads and gateways. The Hobart Marsh Plan project was funded in part by a grant from the U.S. Department of Commerce, National Oceanic and Atmospheric Administration, and was administered by the Indiana Department of Natural Resources, Lake Michigan Coastal Program.
- The Comprehensive Plan of the City of Hobart was amended to include the Hobart Marsh Plan by resolution of the Common Council of the City of Hobart, Indiana.
- Natural areas within the Hobart Marsh Neighborhood Groups were studied and published in the "Hobart Sustainable Neighborhoods: Environmental / Ecological Sub Plan" which was made possible in part by grant funding from the National Oceanic and Atmospheric Administration and the Indiana Department of Natural Resources, Lake Michigan Coastal Program. The publication focused solely on the ecology portion of sustainability and sought to identify and set benchmarks for environmental considerations within Hobart. The report summarized tree canopy coverage, impervious surfaces, land coverage and open spaces, and managed lands, parks, trails, and recreational facilities were among topics that are found throughout the City of Hobart, including areas within the Hobart Marsh Plan.

2014

- The non-profit group Friends of Robinson Lake host their 3rd annual paddling event with cooperation from the Northwest Indiana Paddling Association providing beginning paddlers an opportunity to experience canoeing and kayaking with loaner boats available at Robinson Lake, centrally located within the Hobart Marsh area.
- The Indiana Dunes National Lakeshore hosted a Hobart Prairie Bike Program, a 2-hour guided bike ride on the trail within the Hobart Marsh area hosted by a National Park Service park ranger.

2015

- Members of the City of Hobart Plan Commission participating in a panel discussion sponsored by the Legacy Foundation's Neighborhood Spotlight program noted that a large area in the Northwest part of the city is wetland and poised to become a center of recreational activity under the Hobart Marsh Plan.
- Approximately 400 catfish ranging in size from 11 to 14 inches were released into the 16-acre Robinson Lake by the Indiana Department of Natural Resources.
- The Legacy Foundation's Neighborhood Spotlight program presented initial findings in a Kickoff Report that included numerous positive references to the abundance of natural areas that exist in and around the northwest areas of Hobart that include many of the natural areas within the Hobart Marsh Plan. The comments from the community were collected from 189 one-on-one interviews and 7 group interviews as part of a community SWOT analysis of Hobart's northwest side.
- The Neighborhood Spotlight program in Hobart, sponsored by the Legacy Foundation, awarded grant money to help brand the area's nature preserves. Four grants for $370 each purchased signs and posts to identify three nature preserves in the Spotlight area that are also within the Hobart Marsh Plan. The recipients awarded for the signs were Woodland Savanna Land Conservancy for its Levan Wetland Nature Preserve, Shirley Heinze Land Trust (2 signs) for its Greiner Nature Preserve, and Save the Dunes Conservation Fund for its 11-acre Prairie Nature Preserve.
- Save the Dunes acquired nearly 100 acres in the City of Hobart, Indiana and is significant because 35 acres of the property lie inside the Indiana Dunes National Lakeshore official boundary, a piece that is within their Hobart Prairie Grove Unit. With the land acquired by Save the Dunes, it will be donated to the Indiana Dunes National Lakeshore in the future.

2016

- City of Hobart hosts the Hobart Marsh Summit at the Festival Park Community Center in Hobart. Representatives from various conservation and government groups met to share updates on the work they have been doing on the properties they manage within the Hobart Marsh area. The National Park Service shared information relating to a walking trail they would be installing and the U.S. Army Corps of Engineers noted their plans with natural area remediation would be starting soon, saying, "It's Imminent."
- The National Park Service and its partners hosted a ribbon-cutting ceremony on the newest trail in the park named the "Hobart Woodland Trail" at Hobart Prairie Grove. The Hobart Woodland Trail brought the total trail network mileage to 50 for trails managed by the Indiana Dunes National Lakeshore as the lakeshore celebrated its 50th anniversary. Hikes and other activities were available also to celebrate National Trails Day.
- Funding awarded to Save the Dunes from the Chi-Cal Rivers Fund for restoration and public use enhancement on the Peddicord property in Hobart Marsh.

2017

- The City of Hobart Public Works authorized the placement of the first wayfinding boulders marking the "Hobart Nature District" with the initial two boulders being purchased through grants from the Legacy Foundation. The Legacy Foundation also funded the Neighborhood Spotlight program, which identified increasing tourism and promoting natural areas in Hobart among several goals identified to revitalize the city's northwest area. The findings of the Neighborhood Spotlight program included the installation of signage included among action steps associated within the nature district.
- Groundbreaking ceremony for the Hobart Marsh Wetland Mitigation Project took place in April with mitigation efforts beginning earlier in January with restoration and enhancement of savanna and woodland types, restoration of emergent wetland, sedge meadows, and wet-mesic and mesic prairie. It was noted the project was 26 years in the making and the mitigation will take 5 years to complete. The project satisfies wetland mitigation obligations impacted by the Little Calumet River Flood Risk Management Project. Among those attending the groundbreaking ceremony included U.S. Rep. Pete Visclosky, Col. Christopher Drew, commander of the Chicago District of the U.S. Army Corps of Engineers, Bruno Pigott, commissioner of the Indiana Department of Environmental Management, Cameron Clark, Director of the Indiana Department of Natural Resources, and Hobart Mayor Brian Snedecor.
- The "Hobart Nature District" was officially established by resolution of the Common Council of the City of Hobart, Indiana on July 19, 2017. This resolution determined the phrase "Hobart Nature District" was the best way to refer to the areas of the Hobart Marsh Plan which was established by the city in 2013.
- The City of Hobart placed the fourth wayfinding boulder marking the "Hobart Nature District" adjacent to the Izaak Walton League's Spring Lake property within the Hobart Nature District. Members of Izaak Walton's Spring Lake shared updates about their recent preservation efforts on that property that is home to about 200 native species of plants.

2018

- The 4th Annual Hobart Marsh Summit took place with conservation groups and landowners within the 1,000-acre Hobart Nature District sharing information regarding brush and invasive species removal, native seedlings and plantings, erosion control, and other enhancements within the district.
- On June 9, 2018, Shirley Heinze Land Trust hosted an educational bus tour of its nature preserves. During the ride, staff, board members and guest speakers, including IUN Geosciences Professor Dr. Erin Argyilan, provided insights on land conservation and the ecology, geology, and history of northwestern Indiana. The bus tour traveled through the Hobart Marsh conservation area and passed by nature preserves located near I-65, including Hidden Prairie/Ivory Wetlands on the west, and Brinson/Bock Higgins prairies to the east. The bus tour also stopped for a short hike at Bur Oak Woods where participants visited the rare bur oak savanna natural community, with trees that are several hundred years old.

2019

- The City of Hobart and the Northwest Indiana Regional Planning Committee initiated a planning process to begin the creation of zoning standards to guide the design and use of sites within local conservation areas. The geographic focus of the initiative was on areas outlined in the Hobart Marsh Plan and now commonly referred to as the Hobart Nature District. Information presented included details about Hobart's partners in conservation, animals and plants unique to Hobart, and sought to clarify facts involving conservation development.
- In December 2019, appraisals were done on the property within the Hobart Nature District currently owned by the GEO Group and formerly owned by the St. Sava Serbian Orthodox Church in an effort led by the Lake County Parks and Recreation to add the 40 acre parcel to the property owned and maintained by Lake County Parks and open to the public for recreation purposes.

=== 2020s ===
2020

- On May 26, 2020, it was announced that Lake County Parks and Recreation was officially in talks with GEO Group to acquire the 40 acre wooded parcel formerly owned by St. Sava Serbian Orthodox Church with plans to add it to the inventory of properties owned by Lake County Parks with the intention of opening the land to the public for recreation.

2021

- On January 6, 2021, a motion carried with a 7–0 vote in the Hobart City Council authorizing the Mayor to issue a letter, supporting the Lake County Parks acquisition of the property (40 acres owned by the GEO Group and formerly the site of the St. Sava Serbian Orthodox Church) and encouraging the Little Cal River Basin Development Commission to contribute the funds to facilitate the purchase of the property to keep this as a natural area under the control of Lake County Parks.
- On February 17, 2021, the Lake County Parks and Recreation presented a proposal to the Little Calumet River Basin Development Commission requesting funding to contribute funding to facilitate the purchase of the 40 acres owned by the GEO Group within the Hobart Nature District that was formerly the site of the St. Sava Serbian Orthodox Church.
- In April 2021 Craig Zandstra, superintendent of planning and natural resources for Lake County Parks, confirmed the purchase of the property from GEO Group within the Hobart Nature District (once the site of St. Sava Serbian Orthodox Church). Zandstra noted Lake County Parks intends to enhance and restore native plant communities on the site, as well as constructing non-motorized trails to connect natural areas in the city. The Little Calumet River Basin Development Commission, the Friends of Robinson Lake, the Shirley Heinze Land Trust, Lake County Parks, Indiana Department of Natural Resources and the Lake Heritage Park Foundation contributed funding for the local match to the federal grants.
- On December 2, 2021, staff from the Great Lakes Fire Management Zone based at Indiana Dunes National Park, conducted a Prescribed Fire on the 181 acre Hobart Prairie Grove. The area burned included property on the west side of Lake George, south of 48th Ave, east of Liverpool Road, and north of 61st Ave.

2022

- On March 2, 2022, Indiana Department of Natural Resources, Division of Nature Preserves, implemented a prescribed fire across 19 acres at Hobart Marsh Conservation Area.
- On March 16, 2022, the Indiana Department of Nature Resources, Division of Nature Preserves, implemented a prescribed fire across 25 acres at McCloskey's Burr Oak Savanna.
- Indiana Department of Natural Resources (DNR) travels across the state each year filling urban lakes and ponds with channel catfish and rainbow trout. Between March 16 and 22 the DNR stocked Robinson Lake in Hobart received 300 catfish. Another 275 catfish will be added to Robinson Lake between May 9 and 13 and 150 more between May 31 and June 3.
- On July 15, 2022, the City of Hobart Parks and Recreation began the refurbishment of Robinson Lake's old parking lot. The grassy sod was scraped off and millings were trucked in. New playground equipment will be installed when the parking area is complete.

2023

- A new playground was dedicated August 31, 2023 at Robinson Lake Park. The park department has planted about 100 trees on the lake's western end to eventually block the view of I-65.
- Hobart Firefighters Local 1641 donated bright red life ring and rope installed in August 2023.

2024

- The Indiana Department of Natural Resources stocked Robinson Lake with 300 catfish in March 2024. The stocking of the lake was part of the DNR's urban fishing program.

== Local partners ==
Many local partners work together to protect, restore, and promote the natural areas within the Hobart Nature District. These partners work together to secure resources for restoration projects and recreation improvements.

- City of Hobart
- Indiana Department of Natural Resources
- Izaak Walton League
- Lake County Parks
- Indiana Dunes National Park / National Park Service
- Save the Dunes
- Shirley Heinze Land Trust
- U.S. Army Corps of Engineers
- Woodland Savanna Land Conservancy

== Natural Area Features and Access ==
The Hobart Nature District features 13 distinct natural areas within the boundaries of the district. A 14th distinct natural area within the boundaries of the Hobart Nature District was added in April 2021 with property adjacent to Robinson Lake Park that was acquired by Lake County Parks and Recreation.

=== Brinson & Bock / Higgins ===
- 25 acres owned by Shirley Heinze Land Trust
- Burr oak savanna restoration
- No trails
- Access from Oak Savanna Trail

=== Burr Oak Woods ===
- 84 acres owned by Shirley Heinze Land Trust
- Bur oak savanna
- 2-mile trail
- Parking lot on Liverpool Road

=== Cressmoor Prairie ===
- 41 acres owned by Shirley Heinze Land Trust
- Tallgrass prairie
- 0.75-mile trail
- Parking lot on North Lake Park Road

=== Eleven Acre Prairie ===
- 11 acres owned by Shirley Heinze Land Trust
- Remnant prairie
- No parking lot or trails

=== Gordon & Faith Greiner Nature Preserve ===
- 73 acres owned by Shirley Heinze Land Trust
- Wetlands, wet prairie and woodlands
- 0.08-mile trail
- Parking lot on Liverpool Road

=== Hidden Prairie & Ivory Wetlands ===
- 61 acres - Restricted - Access by special permission only - owned by Shirley Heinze Land Trust
- Wet prairie, swamp, marsh, and open water

=== Hobart Prairie Grove ===
- 300 acres owned by National Park Service
- 1.1 mile trail
- Contains 343 native plants and an abundance of wildlife with forested ravines, overlook of Lake George
- Park at 5250 South Liverpool Road

=== Levan Wetland ===
- 17 acres owned by Woodland Savanna Land Conservancy
- Sandy woods and fen-like wetlands
- No parking lot or trails

=== McCloskey's Burr Oak Savanna ===
- 55 acres owned by Indiana Department of Natural Resources
- 1-mile trail
- Burr oak savanna and tallgrass prairie; The burr oak savanna is a natural community type and currently one of the rarest communities in the state
- Parking lot on north side of 49th Avenue, east of solar farm.

=== Oak Savannah Trail ===
- 8+ miles owned by National Park Service
- East Trailhead: 4 North Hobart Road, Hobart
- West Trailhead: 301 South Colfax Street, Griffith

=== Peddicord ===
- 91 acres owned by Save the Dunes
- Opened in the summer of 2018
- 1-mile trail
- Undulating ravines and overlook of Lake George
- Parking lot on west side of Arizona Street

=== Robinson Lake Park ===
- 30 acres owned by City of Hobart
- 17-acre lake open to the public for fishing and paddling, picnic shelters and restrooms
- Parking lot 5250 Liverpool Road

=== Spring Lake ===
- 50 acres owned by Izaak Walton League
- 21-acre man-made lake, 6-acre black soil prairie
- Access restricted to Izaak Walton League members and public events
- 4700 West 49th Avenue
