= Southlake Mall =

Southlake Mall may refer to:

- Southlake Mall (Atlanta), a shopping mall in Morrow, Georgia
- Southlake Mall (Indiana), a shopping mall in Hobart, Indiana, known as Westfield Southlake from 2002 to 2013
