= Rudy Kuechenberg =

American football player (1943–2025)

No. 63, 59
- Position: Linebacker

Personal information
- Born: February 7, 1943; Hobart, Indiana, U.S.
- Died: December 15, 2025 (aged 82)
- Listed height: 6 ft 0 in (1.83 m)
- Listed weight: 215 lb (98 kg)

Career information
- High school: Hobart
- College: Indiana (1961–1964)
- NFL draft: 1965: undrafted

Career history
- Dallas Cowboys (1965)*; Philadelphia Bulldogs (1965); Dallas Cowboys (1966)*; Chicago Bears (1966–1969); Cleveland Browns (1970); Green Bay Packers (1970); Atlanta Falcons (1971); Chicago Fire (1974)
- * Offseason or practice squad member only

Awards and highlights
- All-WFL (1974)

Career NFL statistics
- Fumble recoveries: 1
- Sacks: 2
- Stats at Pro Football Reference

Rudolph Bernard Kuechenberg (February 7, 1943 – December 15, 2025) was an American professional football player who was a linebacker for five seasons in the National Football League (NFL) with the Chicago Bears, Cleveland Browns, Green Bay Packers, and Atlanta Falcons. He played college football for the Indiana Hoosiers. He also played for the Chicago Fire of the World Football League (WFL) in 1974 and earned All-WFL honors.

== Early life ==
Rudolph Bernard Kuechenberg was born on February 7, 1943, in Hobart, Indiana. He attended Hobart High School in Hobart. In 1959, Hobart High School went undefeated for the first time and Kuechenberg earned All-State honorable mention honors. He graduated in 1961.

== College career ==
At Indiana University Bloomington, Kuechenberg was a member of the Hoosiers from 1961 to 1964. He was a three-year letterman from 1962 to 1964. He played both offense and defense at Indiana. Kuechenberg caught 10 passes for 115 yards and one touchdown in 1962, five passes for 59 yards in 1963, and 13 passes for 146 yards and two touchdowns in 1964. He played in the 1965 North–South Shrine Game and set a Shrine Game record for longest interception returned for a touchdown with a 65-yarder. He was also the Indiana Golden Gloves Heavyweight Champ in 1963.

== Professional career ==
Kuechenberg signed with the Dallas Cowboys of the National Football League (NFL) after going undrafted in 1965. He was released by the Cowboys on August 8, 1965.

He then spent the 1965 season as a middle linebacker for the Philadelphia Bulldogs of the Continental Football League. He recorded five interceptions for the Bulldogs that year.

Kuechenberg re-signed with the Cowboys again in 1966 but was later released on August 31, 1966.

He was then signed by the Chicago Bears in 1966 and was moved to the team's taxi squad. He did not play in any games during the 1966 season. Kuechenberg played in all 14 games for the Bears in 1967. He appeared in all 14 games again in 1968 and recorded one fumble recovery. He played in 14 games, starting 10, during the 1969 season and made two sacks. Kuechenberg was released by the Bears in 1970.

Kuechenberg signed with the Cleveland Browns in 1970 and appeared in three games for the team that season before being released.

He then signed with the Green Bay Packers and played in six games for them during the 1970 season. He was released by the Packers in 1971.

Kuechenberg was signed by the Atlanta Falcons in 1971 and played in three games before being released that same year.

He played for the Chicago Fire of the World Football League (WFL) in 1974 and totaled two interceptions. He was named to the All-WFL team that season.

== Personal life and death ==
Kuechenberg was a firefighter after his NFL career. He was inducted into the Indiana Football Hall of Fame on June 23, 1996. He was also inducted into the Indiana Sports Hall of Fame in 2023.

Kuechenberg died on December 15, 2025, at the age of 82.

His brother, Bob Kuechenberg, was an All-Pro offensive lineman with the Miami Dolphins.
