= Hobart Commercial District =

Historic district in Indiana, United States

- U.S. National Register of Historic Places
- U.S. Historic district
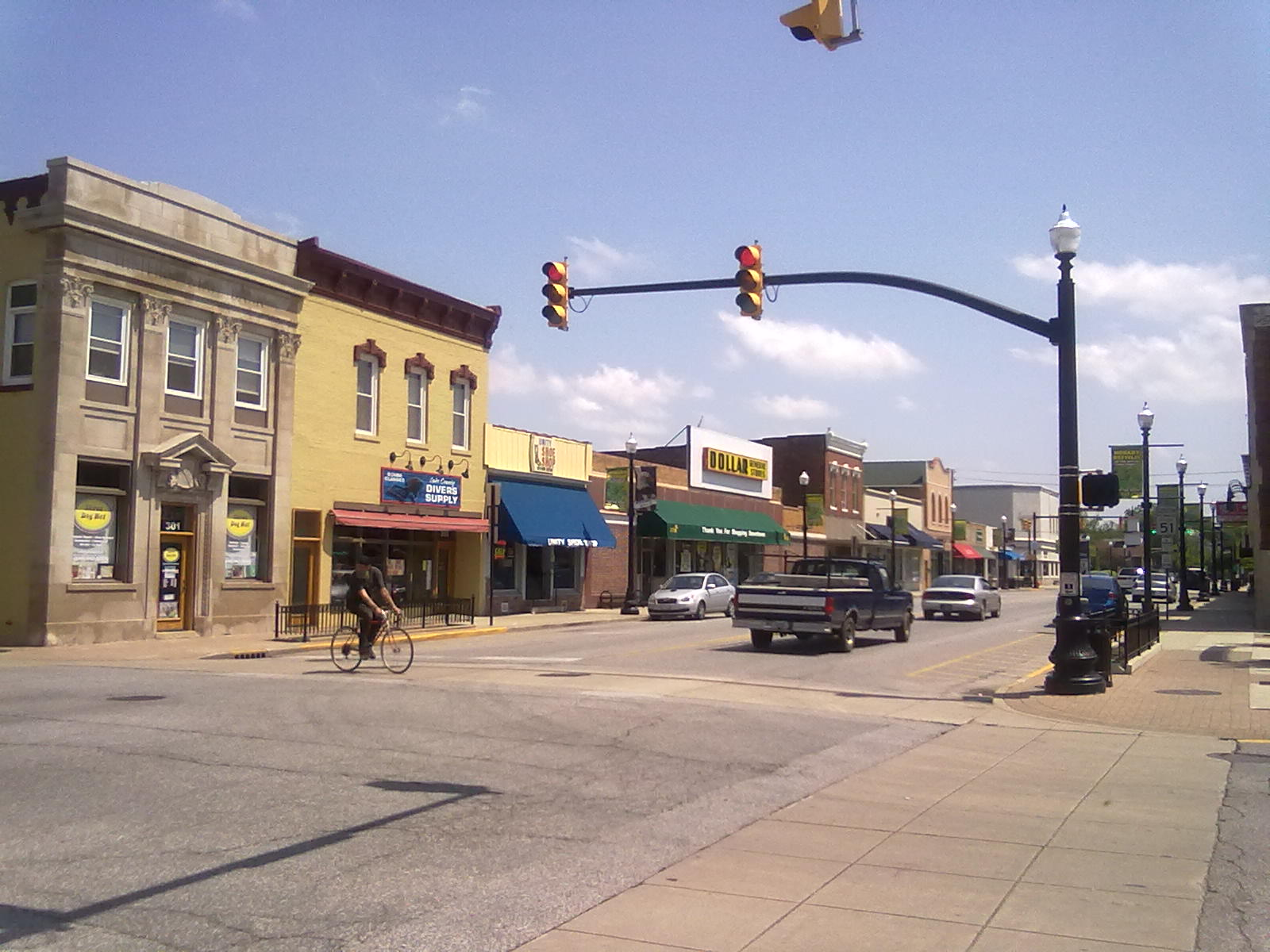
- Main Street in downtown Hobart, May 2011

- Location within Indiana Location within the United States
- Location: Roughly bounded by Lake George, the Norfolk Southern rail line, and Center and 2nd Sts.. Hobart, Indiana
- Coordinates: 41°31′55″N 87°15′17″W
- Area: 9 acres (3.6 ha)
- Built: 1898
- Built by: Reinert, Keith; Simon, Louis; Lightner, Seward
- Architectural style: Italianate, Classical Revival, Art Deco
- NRHP reference No.: 14001037
- Added to NRHP: December 16, 2014

Hobart Commercial District is a national historic district located at Hobart, Indiana. The district encompasses 38 contributing buildings in the central business district of Hobart. It developed between about 1869 and 1963, and includes notable example of Italianate, Classical Revival, and Art Deco style architecture. Notable buildings include the Verplank Building (1928), Orcutt Hotel and Office / Mander Building (1915), Fiester Building (1907), Fiester Building (1890–1893), Hobart Bank (c. 1884, c. 1930), Art Theater (c. 1941), Ben Ack Building (1926), Hobart Post Office (1936–1937, 1966), Roper Building / American Bank and Trust (1890, 1926), First State Bank (1888, 1922), Lake George Hotel / Stocker Building (c. 1888), Schultz Brothers Variety Store (1947), and the Kostbase Building (1950).

It was listed on the National Register of Historic Places in 2014.
