= Michael Kaczmarek =

American football player (born 1951) (died September 28, 2024)

No. 52
- Position: Linebacker

Personal information
- Born: October 31, 1951 (age 75); Gary, Indiana, U.S.
- Died: September 28, 2024; Bloomingdale, Illinois, U.S.
- Listed height: 6 ft 4 in (1.93 m)
- Listed weight: 235 lb (107 kg)

Career information
- High school: Hobart
- College: Southern Illinois
- NFL draft: 1973: undrafted

Career history
- Baltimore Colts (1973)

Career NFL statistics
- Interceptions: 1
- Sacks: 1
- Stats at Pro Football Reference

Michael Louis Kaczmarek (October 31, 1951 – September 28, 2024) is an American former professional football player who was a linebacker for the Baltimore Colts in 1973. He played college football for the Southern Illinois Salukis.
