= Ainsworth, Indiana =

- Neighborhood
- Location within Indiana Location within the United States
- Coordinates: 41°29′16″N 87°15′31″W
- Country: United States
- State: Indiana
- County: Lake
- Township: Ross
- City: Hobart
- Founded: c. 1880
- Elevation: 663 ft (202 m)

Population (2000)
  - Total: 320
- Time zone: UTC-6 (CST)
  - Summer (DST): UTC-5 (CDT)
- ZIP code: 46342 (Hobart)
- Area code: 219
- FIPS code: 18-00694
- GNIS feature ID: 430149

Ainsworth is a neighborhood of Hobart, Indiana. Prior to the early 1990s, it was an unincorporated community in Ross Township, Lake County, Indiana.

== History ==
The Grand Trunk Railroad was extended to Ainsworth in 1880. Ainsworth was possibly named after a prominent railroad official.

A post office was opened in 1882 in Ainsworth and closed in 1934.

In the early 1990s the area containing Ainsworth was annexed by the city of Hobart. A failed attempt to fight the annexation would have seen the area incorporated into the town of Ainsworth, thus bringing back the name of the old village. It is located near the intersection of Indiana State Road 51 and the Canadian National Railway (formerly the Grand Trunk Western Railroad).
