= First Unitarian Church of Hobart =

Historic church in Indiana, United States

- U.S. National Register of Historic Places
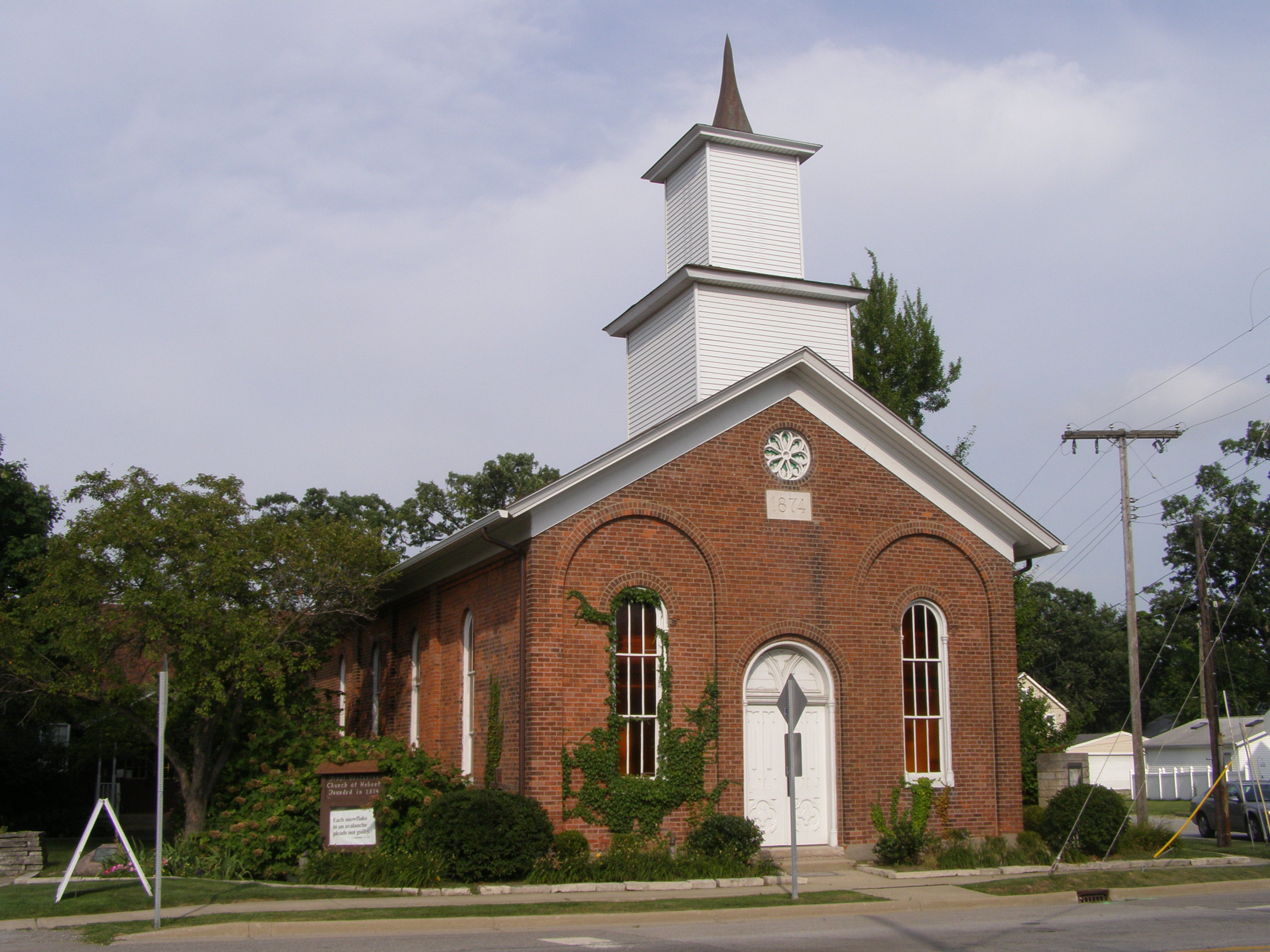

- Location within Indiana Location within the United States
- Location: 497 Main St., Hobart, Indiana
- Coordinates: 41°31′48″N 87°15′12″W
- Area: less than one acre
- Built: 1875
- Architect: Pollard, O.D. & Co.
- Architectural style: Italianate
- NRHP reference No.: 99001112
- Added to NRHP: September 9, 1999

First Unitarian Church of Hobart is the oldest Unitarian Church in Indiana, and the oldest church still occupied by its original congregation in the city of Hobart. It was added to the National Register of Historic Places on September 9, 1999.

The church is an Italianate style. The building's simple design on both the interior and exterior has not been altered since its construction. George Earle laid out the town of Hobart in 1848 on property that he owned near his saw and gristmill. To encourage development, he offered free land for community projects such as a railroad and congregations wishing to build churches with a resident minister and regular services. A group of Hobart citizens organized "a society founded on the principals taught and promulgated by the Unitarians, and for the public worship of God, [and] also for the advancement of the principles of morality and the ultimate good of society in general," in 1848 with 48 members.

== History ==
Hobart's Unitarian Church was constructed of locally produced brick at a cost of $15,000.00. The lot for the church was purchased from Hobart's founder, George Earle, for $1.00.

== Description ==
The Unitarian Church a two-story brick structure. The brick structure was built in 1875 and dedicated in January 1876. The frame addition is from 1954 to 1955 and 1990. Built on a city lot, a memorial garden on the north side is surrounded by a stonewall.

Built as a rectangular block using common bond brick walls with a gable roof. There is a three-tiered steeple above the entrance. There are tall, narrow arched windows divided into three sashes of three amber-colored panes. Each window has a stone sill with a semicircular brick crown with brick tabs. The windows on the south or primary facade resemble arches supported by piers with a capital and base. The walls are topped by a plain frieze-like cornice. The steeple has three, incrementally smaller, tiers. Each section has a shingle covered hip roof. Within the lower two section is the church bell.

The piers have a capital and a base that rests on the stone sill. A horizontal molding along the top of the door connects the two capitals. The arch over the double-doors is filled by a wood panel with gothic-like carvings. Centered above the door and near the gable peak is a decorative circular wood insert carved with a floral-like detail. The insert may have replaced a circular window that was never installed or was enclosed when the interior was remodeled. Directly below this stone is a square stone block carved with the date 1874, the year of the congregation's formation. The north and south facades are identical. Each wall is divided by pilasters into four bays. The end bays are longer than the two center, and pilasters are located at each building corner. Windows, equidistant apart, are located within each bay. The center pilaster of the south facade has a brick chimney that services a basement furnace. It starts at ground level and projects up through the eaves. There is an adjoining parish hall and church offices which do not contribute to the historical significance of the church.

The church's interior includes; the vestibule, gallery, and assembly room. The vestibule is a small space inside the main entry doors. The entry to the assembly room is through double-doors centered between two single doors. All four doors are wooden with four panels. A gallery is above the vestibule for use as a choir loft. The assembly room is rectangular and is two floors in height. Both the north and south walls have four arched windows set. At the east end is a stage, up two steps from the main floor. There is a decorative wood backdrop (1964) and wood double-doors on the east wall. The doors lead to the parish hall.

== Bibliography ==
- Hobart Historical Society. Downtown Hobart. Self-published, 1988.
- Indiana Historic Sites and Structures Inventory. Lake County Interim Report. Historic Landmarks Foundation of Indiana, 1996. (P. 17 & 20, No. 04087).
- Northwest Indiana Regional Planning Commission. Historic Preservation Inventory and Assessment. Self-published, 1977. (P. A-4).
- White, Joseph. Where God's People Meet: A Guide to Significant Religious Places in Indiana. Carmel, IN: Guild Press of Indiana, 1996.
