= Hobart High School (Indiana) =

- Yohan

Location
- 2211 East 10th Street; Hobart, Lake County, Indiana 46342; United States
- 41°31′16″N 87°13′56″W

Information
- Type: Public high school
- School district: School City of Hobart
- Superintendent: Peggy Buffington
- Principal: Craig Osika and Colleen Newell
- Teaching staff: 69.00 (on an FTE basis)
- Grades: 9-12
- Enrollment: 1,343 (2023-2024)
- Student to teacher ratio: 19.46
- Colors: Purple and gold
- Fight song: "Our Team will Shine Tonight" sung to the tune of the Washington and Lee Swing
- Athletics conference: Northwest Crossroads Conference
- Mascot: Yohan Petrovich
- Nickname: Brickies
- Rivals: Valparaiso High School; Merrillville High School; Andrean High School
- Accreditation: Cognia
- Newspaper: Ho-Hi Life
- Yearbook: Memories
- Website: hobartbrickies.com

Hobart High School is located in Hobart, Indiana, in the School City of Hobart district. U.S. News & World Report ranked it 163rd within Indiana and 7,137th in National Rankings. Their ranking was based upon performance on state-required tests, graduation rates, and college preparation. Their college Advanced Placement participation rate is 31%.

== History ==
The graduating class of 2009 was the first class to graduate from the school's new building at 2211 East 10th Street. The old high school, located at 36 East 8th Street, became the middle school. That building was built in the late 1950s. Prior to that, the high school students attended Roosevelt School, most recently part of the old junior high school on 4th Street.

== Demographics ==
The demographic breakdown of the 1,323 students enrolled for the 2015–2016 school year was as follows:

- Male - 49.5%
- Female - 50.5%
- Native American - 0.5%
- Asian/Pacific islander - 0.6%
- Black - 7.5%
- Hispanic - 22.8%
- White - 65.8%
- Multiracial - 2.8%

675 students were eligible for free or reduced-cost lunch for the 2023–2024 school year.

== Athletics ==
The sports teams at Hobart High School are known as the "Brickies," a name derived from the brick yards that were historically located in Hobart and employed many people in the area. The school mascot is a bricklayer named Yohan. Uniform colors are Purple and Gold. Sports offered include:

- Baseball (boys)
- Basketball (girls)
- Cross Country (boys and girls)
  - Boys state champs - 1957, 1960.
- Football (boys)
  - State champs - 1987, 1989, 1991, 1993.
- Golf (boys and girls)
- Gymnastics (girls)
  - State champs - 2004.
- Soccer (boys and girls)
- Softball (girls)
- Swimming (boys and girls)
- Tennis (boys and girls)
- Track (boys and girls)
- Volleyball (girls)
- Wrestling (boys)

== Notable alumni ==
- Omar Apollo - R&B musician
- Larry Bigbie - Former MLB player for the Baltimore Orioles, Colorado Rockies and St. Louis Cardinals
- Michael Kaczmarek - Former NFL linebacker
- Ted Karras Jr. - College football coach
- Bob Kuechenberg - Former NFL All-Pro lineman for the Miami Dolphins
- Rudy Kuechenberg - Former NFL linebacker for the Chicago Bears, Cleveland Browns, Green Bay Packers and Atlanta Falcons
- Dale Messick - Commercial artist and creator of Brenda Starr
- Craig Osika - Former NFL player
- Gary Primich - Blues musician
- Emil Uremovich - Former NFL lineman
- David Vinzant - Former member of the Indiana Senate

== See also ==
- List of high schools in Indiana
