= School City of Hobart =

School district in Indiana, United States

Address
- 32 East 7th Street Hobart, Indiana, 46342; United States
- Coordinates: 41°32′N 87°15′W

District information
- Grades: PK-12
- Superintendent: Peggy Buffington
- Schools: 6

Students and staff
- Enrollment: 4,088 (2019-2020)
- Teachers: 174.40 (on an FTE basis)
- Student–teacher ratio: 23.44
- Athletic conference: Northwest Crossroads Conference
- District mascot: Brickies
- Colors: Purple and gold

Other information
- Website: www.hobart.k12.in.us

School City of Hobart is a school district headquartered in Hobart, Indiana. The district serves most of the city of Hobart.

== Schools ==
All schools are in Hobart.

- Hobart High School (9–12)
- Hobart Middle School (6–8)
- George Earle Early Learning Center (PK–K)
- Veteran's Elementary School at Mundell (1–5)
- Liberty Elementary School (1–5)
- Joan Martin Elementary School (1–5)
