= Craig Osika =

American football player (born 1979)

No. 62
- Positions: Center, Guard

Personal information
- Born: December 4, 1979 (age 46); Merrillville, Indiana, U.S.
- Listed height: 6 ft 3 in (1.91 m)
- Listed weight: 318 lb (144 kg)

Career information
- High school: Hobart (Hobart, Indiana)
- College: Indiana
- NFL draft: 2002: undrafted

Career history
- San Diego Chargers (2002)*; San Francisco 49ers (2002); Amsterdam Admirals (2003); Cleveland Browns (2003-2004); Jacksonville Jaguars (2005)*
- * Offseason or practice squad member only

Career NFL statistics
- Games played: 1
- Games started: 0
- Stats at Pro Football Reference

Craig Osika is an American former professional football player who was an offensive lineman in the National Football League (NFL). He played college football for the Indiana Hoosiers.

He was the head football coach at Hobart High School in Hobart Indiana until 2023. He is currently the co-principal at Hobart High School.

== Playing career ==
Osika played high school football at Hobart High School and college football for the Indiana Hoosiers.

In a four-year career in the NFL from 2002 until 2005, he was with the San Francisco 49ers, Cleveland Browns, and Jacksonville Jaguars. Osika played in one regular season game for the Browns during week 7 of the 2003 season.

== Coaching career ==
In 2018, Osika was named the head football coach of his alma mater, Hobart High School.
