= Southlake Mall (Indiana) =

Shopping mall in Merrillville, Indiana

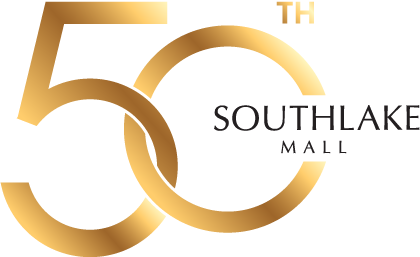

- Southern entrance of Southlake Mall (March 2007)
- Location: Hobart, Indiana, United States
- Coordinates: 41.468418°N 87.310939°W
- Address: 2109 Southlake Mall; Merrillville, Indiana
- Opened: September 8, 1974; 52 years ago
- Previous names: Westfield Shoppingtown Southlake Mall (2002-2005); Westfield Southlake Mall (2005-2013)
- Developer: Richard E. Jacobs Group
- Manager: Starwood Capital Group
- Owner: Pacific Retail Capital Partners
- Num. of stores: 148
- Num. of anchor tenants: 9 (6 open, 2 vacant)
- Floor area: 1,300,000 sq ft (120,000 m^{2})
- Floors: 2
- Parking: Free
- Public transit: Gary Public Transportation Corporation
- Website: shoppingsouthlakemall.com

Southlake Mall is a shopping mall in Hobart, Indiana, although it is often marketed as being in Merrillville, primarily due to its 46410 ZIP Code. The tract of land on which it sits was annexed by the city of Hobart from Ross Township in 1993. Southlake Mall is the only enclosed super regional mall in Northwest Indiana, as well as one of largest in the state overall along with Castleton Square (Indianapolis) and Glenbrook Square (Fort Wayne).

The mall's anchor stores are JCPenney, Fashion Q, H&M, Kids Empire, Kohl’s, and Macy’s. The two vacant anchor stores were previously a Carson Pirie Scott (Carson’s) and Sears.

== History ==
Richard E. Jacobs's Jacobs Visconsi Jacobs group built the mall in 1974. The company put it up for sale in 1999, but it was not purchased until 2002 by The Westfield Group, who renamed it Westfield Shoppingtown Southlake, and again to Westfield Southlake.

On March 12, 1993, a 2-level Kohl's officially opened nearby in the mall's parking lot. Target Greatland opened east of Sears on October 6, 1993. A year later in 1994, Gander Mountain opened on the southwest side of the mall. The Home Depot then opened in the east corner of the parking lot on July 27, 1995.

Westfield Southlake underwent a significant expansion in 2006 that added Dick's Sporting Goods and a Borders bookstore, as well as several structures in the mall's outlot areas, including a 12-screen AMC theater, a Fifth Third Bank branch, Chipotle Mexican Grill, Potbelly Sandwich Works, Red Robin, and Buffalo Wild Wings.

In July 2011, Borders announced it would be closing all of its stores by the end of September due to Chapter 7 Bankruptcy liquidation, including the Southlake Mall location. After Borders was closed, it became Books-A-Million.

Cooper's Hawk Winery & Restaurants opened in August 2012.

On November 10, 2012, a group of teens ranging from age 14 to 16 were arrested after an altercation with another group of teens. One of the teens shot a 7.62×25mm Tokarev into the ceiling, which caused the gun to jam. The mall was shut down after the shooting and resumed business on November 11, 2012.

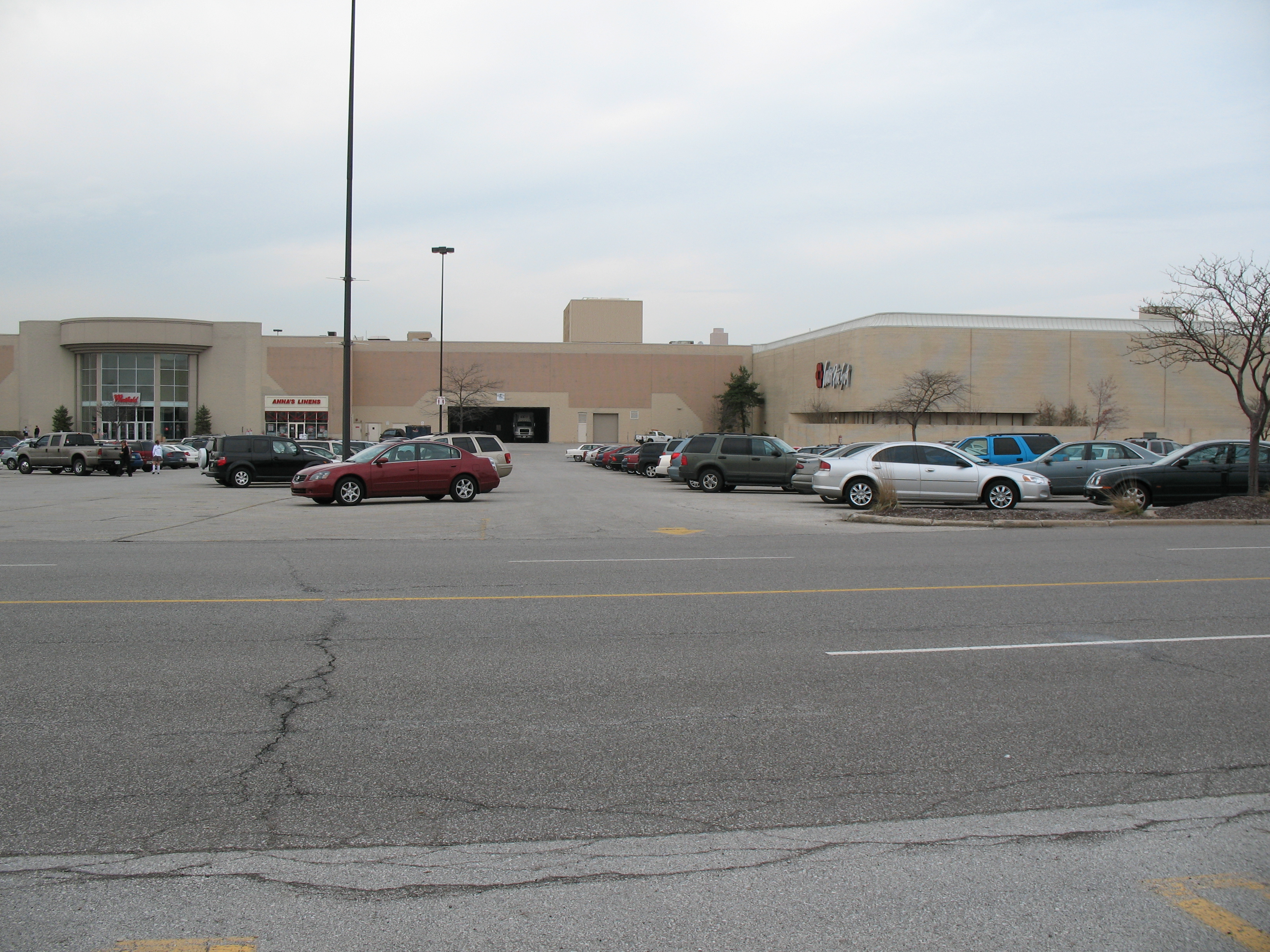
Carson Pirie Scott wing at Westfield Southlake

Specialty discount retailer rue21 opened a store in the JCPenney wing in March 2013.

Westfield Group sold the mall and several others to Starwood Capital in September 2013. As part of the sale, the mall's name reverted to Southlake Mall.

Books-A-Million relocated in 2014 and the old location became Forever 21 the same year. H&M opened at Southlake Mall in the same wing in 2015.

On April 18, 2018, Carson's announced it would be closing as parent company The Bon-Ton Stores was going out of business. The store closed on August 29, 2018.

On August 6, 2019, Sears announced that it would also be closing as part of a plan to close 26 stores nationwide. The store closed on November 10, 2019. The company had previously, on April 12, 2018, put the building up for sale.

On September 21, 2021, Dick's Sporting Goods announced it would move out of the mall and relocate to an off mall location across the street at the Crossings at Hobart.

On November 3, 2022, CubeWork, a flexible workspace and warehouse company, announced that they would be converting the vacant Carson Pirie Scott space into pop-up retail space, co-working offices, and sports events space. The concept opened on November 15, 2022.

On November 25, 2022, Kids Empire, an indoor playground and party zone, announced that they would be filling the former Dick's Sporting Goods. Kids Empire was completed and opened in November, 2023.

On March 17, 2025, Forever 21, for the second time in nearly six years, filed for Chapter 11 bankruptcy protection in Delaware, and announced to close all locations, including Southlake Mall. The former Forever 21 has since been replaced by a chain of stores called Fashion Q in October 2026, being the first location in the state of Indiana.

== See also ==
- List of shopping malls in the United States
