= WPA in Hobart, Indiana, Post Office =

Coordinates: 41.5326°N 87.2548°W

During the 1930s, the Roosevelt administration implemented the New Deal, which would develop the Works Progress Administration (WPA). The WPA was a federal jobs program that hired thousands of citizens to construct public works projects. Hobart, Indiana, received funding for multiple public works projects, including the construction of the city's first federal post office and painting of "Early Hobart", the post office lobby's mural.

== Federal Post Office ==
=== Beginnings ===
According to The Hobart Index: The Commonwealth, a local newspaper, in March 1936, the government requested bids for the construction of a new post office. Although the first Hobart post office appeared about 100 years earlier, this was the city's first federal building. Each interested applicant could obtain one copy of drawings and specifications for the building, which required return to the government. Companies that "consistently failed to submit proposals" were not furnished with specifications. All proposals were to be publicly opened on April 15, 1936, in Washington, D.C.

According to the specifications supplied by the U.S. Government, the new building was to be 62 by 58 feet, built with brick and steel, and trimmed in stone. Additionally, "the new structure [was] to be erected on the east side of Main Street between 2nd and 3rd on ground purchased from the Killigrew estate" for $9,000. A total of $67,000 was allotted for the project, leaving $56,000 available after the purchase of the land.

On Wednesday, June 24, 1936, the government obtained absolute title to the land purchased from the Killigrew estate, after "condemnation proceedings were filed in the South Bend Federal Court". The term "condemnation proceedings" refers to eminent domain, in which the government is able to take private property for public use upon compensation to the owner. The next day, Joseph Mellon, the Hobart Post Office postmaster, stated that the formal awarding of the contract was to be expected soon, meaning work could start on the building as soon as late July.

It was not until July that the formal award of the contract came to the Structural Engineering Corporation of New York City. The corporation was awarded the contract because they estimated construction at $46,123, the lowest bid. The contract required the corporation to start work on the building within 30 days of the formal award and allowed 250 days for the completion of the project.

That same month, John W. Murphy, president of the Structural Engineering Corporation of New York City, arrived in Hobart to "complete final details of the job". Part of the remaining details included subletting the contract and buying materials. Murphy explained that he "planned to buy practically all materials for the construction work locally, as well as hire all local help possible on the job".

Murphy kept his word by contracting the William Scharbach Sr. & Sons Lumber Company of Hobart to supply all lumber and building materials used in construction. Furthermore, Murphy granted the plumbing contract to Gary Heating and Plumbing and had intentions of subletting the "electrical, roofing, excavating, and foundation work". Although excavation was to begin on August 17, no excavation contract had been made as of August 13, which could have potentially delayed the start date significantly.

=== Breaking ground ===
On Tuesday, August 18, only one day later than expected, excavation work began. The excavation contract was awarded to the Fred Shearer Construction Company of Gary, Indiana. Hobart citizens were present for the ceremony "wherein the first shovel of dirt was turned over by Mayor Frank Davis assisted by Postmaster Joseph E. Mellon". According to Robert Adams' and Dorothy Ballantyne's book, Along the Route: A History of Hobart, Indiana, Post Offices and Postmasters,

Hobart was a fast Republican Party stronghold in a Democratic Party county and, at the time, a Democratic federal government. Dyed-in-the-wool Republicans were a bit dubious about accepting Democratic favors, but pride in a federal building for Hobart grew until, when the building was ready for use, it was dedicated with a great deal of enthusiasm.

Excavation on the land progressed smoothly, but in mid-September progress slowed due to an inability to obtain enough carpenters. The Hobart Index: The Commonwealth reported on September 24, that Don Stewart, a Wisconsin resident and the construction superintendent, said after finding enough carpenters (half from Hobart and half from neighboring towns), work was again moving along nicely and the framework for the walls would be ready within a few days. This setback was not the last, or the most scandalous during the construction of the Hobart post office.

=== Scandal erupts ===
On Monday, November 16, Don Stewart fled the state with company funds after being fired from his superintendent position for inefficiency the previous Saturday. Per normal routine, Stewart received $400 to deposit into the bank for payroll, early on Friday. However, instead of depositing the money, he kept it, and wrote checks to employees, although he knew the funds were insufficient. After relieving him of his superintendent duties, Stewart's supervisors told him that he would be able to remain on the site and work as a carpenter. However, "when he failed to report to work on Monday along with the fact that several local merchants reported they were holding bad checks, a search was instituted."

When authorities called William Krull, the man Stewart had been boarding with since August, they learned "he had departed shortly after daybreak, taking his entire luggage with him and driving away in his car". Accompanying Stewart was his father, David Stewart, who worked as a carpenter on the post office project. The new construction superintendent, Ingvald Thompson, notified police, who issued a warrant for Stewart's arrest and notified the police in Stewart's hometown, Janesville, Wisconsin.

In December 1936, the Janesville police arrested Stewart on embezzlement charges. According to The Hobart Index: The Commonwealth, "Hobart's police chief, Frank Traeger, announced immediately that he plan[ned] to leave by rail ... to return the fugitive." In addition to being wanted by the Structural Engineering Corporation of New York City, Stewart was also wanted by the Westchester Finance Company of Valparaiso, Indiana, who held "the mortgage on a used car he had purchased from Roper Brothers Garage shortly before he fled town taking the car with him".

On February 16, 1937, Stewart faced Judge William Murray of the Lake Criminal Court in Crown Point, Indiana. Stewart plead "not guilty", claiming that he only took $100 of the funds because the corporation personally owed him that money. As for the remaining $300, Stewart stated that he "placed it in an envelope and left it in the tool shanty". Officials of the case believed that he took the entire amount and, ultimately, he was sentenced to a 2- to 14-year sentence at the Michigan City Penitentiary for embezzlement. "Appearing against him were John Murphy, president of the corporation, who came here from New York City to testify, Byron Findling of the First State Bank, Chief Traeger and Ingvald Thompson."

=== Dedication ===
Work on the post office continued during the Don Stewart scandal and by May 8, 1937, it was ready for its dedication. The ceremony was scheduled for 3 o'clock, with an invocation presented by Reverend C.A. Brown. In addition, postmaster Joseph Mellon gave a history of the Hobart Post Office. After the ceremony, the building was open to visitors for "a complete round of inspection".

== Mural: "Early Hobart" ==
=== Search for historical scenes ===
A little over a year after the post office's dedication, the U.S. Treasury Procurement Division authorized the painting of a mural for the lobby of Hobart's new post office. The artist, William Dolwick, was contracted on March 1, 1938, and spent the following Thursday in Hobart, collaborating with a Mrs. Floyd Demmon. Dolwick's goal was to gather "all old historical scenes ... available" and requested that The Hobart Index: The Commonwealth "broadcast an appeal to readers to submit to him any old prints of early local scenes which they might have". Dolwick stated that he intended to paint the mural at his home in Cleveland, Ohio and then bring it back to Hobart.

=== Completed art ===
The mural depicts early scenes of Hobart, ultimately receiving the title, "Early Hobart". After completion The Hobart Index: The Commonwealth of July 21, 1938, printed an image of the mural with the following description.

The mural entitled, "Early Hobart", is the artist's conception of how Hobart appeared the year of 1870. The building in the extreme left foreground represents an early day trading post and post office combined. Scholler's old blacksmith shop is in the left center with the large building to the right being a gristmill. The old sawmill is at the extreme right. The three characters in the foreground represent early settlers of this city. An Indiana squaw is shown sitting on the trading post steps while her husband is bargaining with the storekeeper inside.

=== Artist's other murals ===
William Dolwick painted other murals while employed by the P.W.A.P. One, entitled "A French Scene", was the reference for style expected by Dolwick for the Hobart Post Office mural. "Early Cleveland" is installed in the Carnegie-Lorian Branch Library of Cleveland and "Gas City in Boom Days" is installed in the Gas City, Indiana, Post Office.

=== "Early Hobart" nearly destroyed ===
In 1965, the post office underwent renovations. By this time, the mural had become "dingy and deteriorated" and was scheduled to be discarded. Edmen Rippe, the postmaster during this time, believed that it should be preserved rather than destroyed and in 1966 enlisted the help of a local artist, Victor Sable, to restore the mural. The mural still hangs today.

=== Preservation ===
The Hobart Historical Society has done an excellent job promoting and preserving the existence of "Early Hobart". It is registered with the Office of Fine Arts and Historic Preservation in Washington, D.C. Additionally, the mural has been featured in various research publications, from books to magazine articles. Preservation of these unique elements of America's history requires great effort and the city of Hobart has succeeded in their endeavor to preserve and promote "Early Hobart".
