= Hobart Sky Ranch Airport =

- IATA: none; ICAO: none; FAA LID: 3HO

Summary
- Airport type: Public
- Owner: Don Niemeyer
- Location: Hobart, Indiana
- Opened: April 1940
- Elevation AMSL: 644 ft (196 m)
- Coordinates: 41°33′15″N 087°15′45″W
- Interactive map of Hobart Sky Ranch Airport

Runways
Direction	Length		Surface
Direction	ft	m	Surface
18/36	3,125	952	Asphalt
- Source: Federal Aviation Administration

Hobart Sky Ranch Airport (FAA LID: 3HO) is a public-use airport located two miles (3 km) northwest of the central business district of Hobart, a city in Lake County, Indiana, United States. This airport is privately owned by Don Niemeyer.

== Facilities ==
Hobart Sky Ranch Airport covers an area of 28 acres (11 ha) which contains one runway:

- Runway 18/36: 3,125 x 40 ft (952 x 12 m), Surface: Asphalt

== Runway ==
The Runway at Hobart Sky Ranch (18/36) is poorly maintained. Currently, there are cracks throughout the runway/taxiway surfaces with grass growing between the cracks. The markings on the runway have faded away.

== See also ==
- List of airports in Indiana
