= Hobart, Indiana =

- City
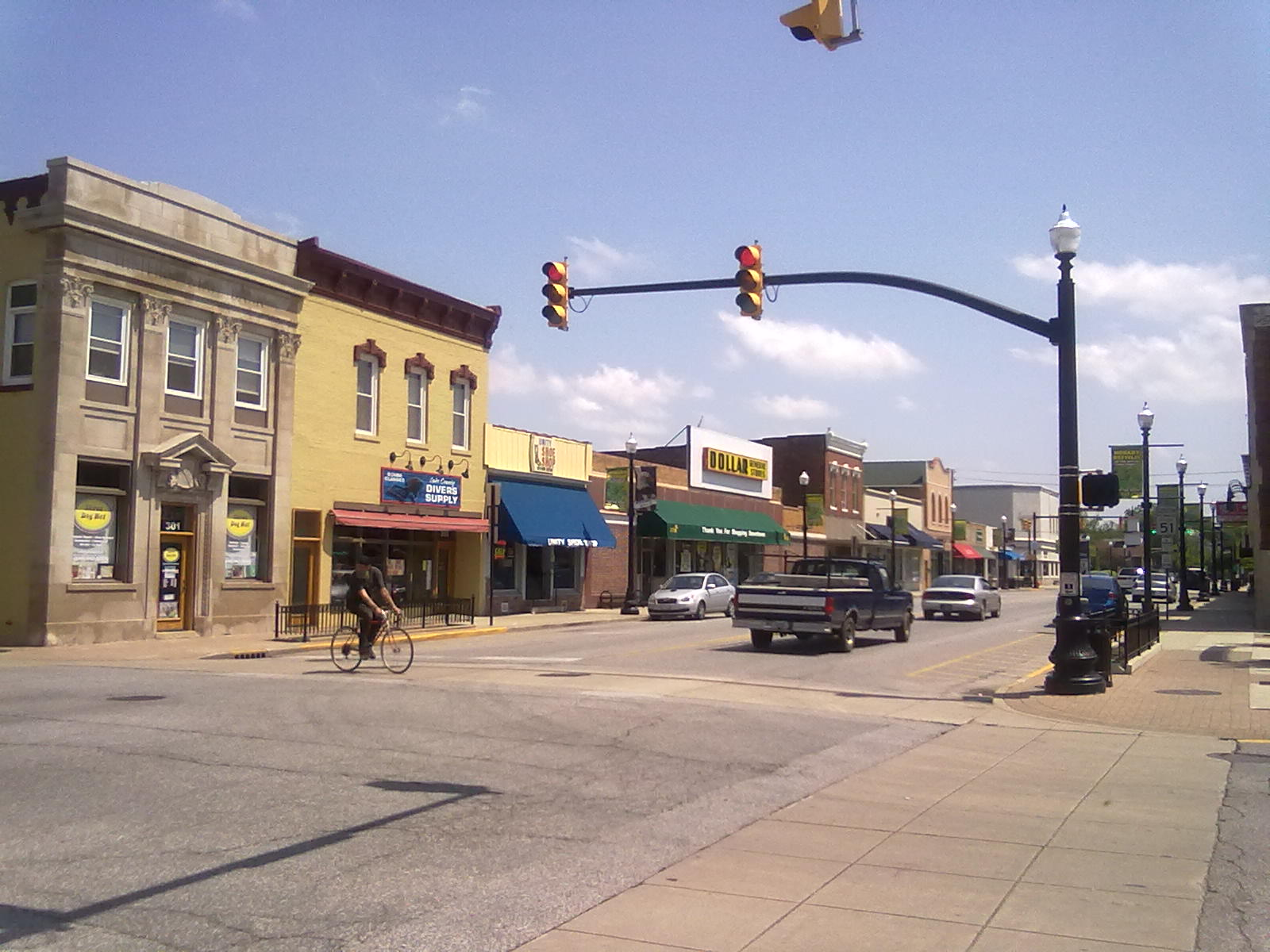
- Main Street in downtown Hobart

- Wordmark

- Location of Hobart in Lake County, Indiana.
- Coordinates: 41°31′43″N 87°16′03″W
- Country: United States
- State: Indiana
- County: Lake
- Townships: Hobart, Ross
- Incorporated (town): 1889
- Incorporated (city): 1921

Government
  - Type: Mayor-Council
  - Mayor: Josh Huddlestun (D)

Area
  - Total: 26.57 sq mi (68.81 km^{2})
  - Land: 26.19 sq mi (67.84 km^{2})
  - Water: 0.37 sq mi (0.97 km^{2})
- Elevation: 627 ft (191 m)

Population (2020)
  - Total: 29,752
  - Density: 1,135.9/sq mi (438.59/km^{2})
- Time zone: UTC-6 (CST)
  - Summer (DST): UTC-5 (CDT)
- ZIP code: 46342
- Area code: 219
- FIPS code: 18-34114
- GNIS feature ID: 2394393
- Website: www.cityofhobart.org

Hobart (/ˈhoʊbɑːrt/ HOH-bart, locally /ˈhoʊbərt/) is a city in Lake County, Indiana, United States. The population was 29,752 at the 2020 census, up from 29,059 in 2010. It has been historically primarily residential, though recent annexation has added a notable retail corridor to the city.

== History ==
Hobart was platted in 1849. George Earle, an English immigrant, bought land from the Potawatomi Native American tribe, who built a dam on Deep River, creating Lake George. He named the settlement that later developed into Hobart, after his brother, Frederick Hobart Earle, who never left England. The first school of the city was built in 1878.

Hobart was incorporated as a town in 1889 and reincorporated as a city in 1921.

The First Unitarian Church of Hobart, Hobart Carnegie Library Hobart Commercial District, and Pennsylvania Railroad Station are listed in the National Register of Historic Places. The Lake George Commercial Historic District is noted locally. Hobart is also the site of several WPA projects, including a post office.

== Geography ==
According to the 2010 census, Hobart has a total area of 26.705 square miles (69.17 km^{2}), of which 26.33 square miles (68.19 km^{2}) (or 98.6%) is land and 0.375 square miles (0.97 km^{2}) (or 1.4%) is water.

Hobart is approximately 31 miles (50 km) southeast of Chicago.

== Demographics ==
Historical population
Census	Pop.	Note	%±
1880	600		—
1890	1,010		68.3%
1900	1,390		37.6%
1910	1,753		26.1%
1920	3,450		96.8%
1930	5,787		67.7%
1940	7,166		23.8%
1950	10,244		43.0%
1960	18,680		82.4%
1970	21,485		15.0%
1980	22,987		7.0%
1990	21,822		−5.1%
2000	25,363		16.2%
2010	29,059		14.6%
2020	29,752		2.4%
Source: US Census Bureau

=== Racial and ethnic composition ===
Hobart city, Indiana – Racial and ethnic composition Note: the US Census treats Hispanic/Latino as an ethnic category. This table excludes Latinos from the racial categories and assigns them to a separate category. Hispanics/Latinos may be of any race.
Race / Ethnicity (NH = Non-Hispanic)	Pop 2000	Pop 2010	Pop 2020	% 2000	% 2010	% 2020
White alone (NH)	22,561	22,338	19,695	88.95%	76.87%	66.20%
Black or African American alone (NH)	347	1,947	2,695	1.37%	6.70%	9.06%
Native American or Alaska Native alone (NH)	42	81	53	0.17%	0.28%	0.18%
Asian alone (NH)	135	280	349	0.53%	0.96%	1.17%
Native Hawaiian or Pacific Islander alone (NH)	4	3	10	0.02%	0.01%	0.03%
Other race alone (NH)	9	22	75	0.04%	0.08%	0.25%
Mixed race or Multiracial (NH)	223	362	1,245	0.88%	1.25%	4.18%
Hispanic or Latino (any race)	2,042	4,026	5,630	8.05%	13.85%	18.92%
Total	25,363	29,059	29,752	100.00%	100.00%	100.00%

=== 2020 census ===
As of the 2020 census, Hobart had a population of 29,752. The median age was 39.5 years. 22.4% of residents were under the age of 18 and 17.4% of residents were 65 years of age or older. For every 100 females there were 94.3 males, and for every 100 females age 18 and over there were 91.1 males age 18 and over.

95.8% of residents lived in urban areas, while 4.2% lived in rural areas.

There were 11,992 households in Hobart, of which 29.9% had children under the age of 18 living in them. Of all households, 43.9% were married-couple households, 18.9% were households with a male householder and no spouse or partner present, and 28.6% were households with a female householder and no spouse or partner present. About 29.5% of all households were made up of individuals and 12.8% had someone living alone who was 65 years of age or older.

There were 12,709 housing units, of which 5.6% were vacant. The homeowner vacancy rate was 1.4% and the rental vacancy rate was 8.4%.

Racial composition as of the 2020 census
Race	Number	Percent
White	21,428	72.0%
Black or African American	2,847	9.6%
American Indian and Alaska Native	155	0.5%
Asian	368	1.2%
Native Hawaiian and Other Pacific Islander	15	0.1%
Some other race	1,584	5.3%
Two or more races	3,355	11.3%
Hispanic or Latino (of any race)	5,630	18.9%

=== 2010 census ===
As of the census of 2010, there were 29,059 people, 11,650 households, and 7,664 families residing in the city. The population density was 1,103.6 inhabitants per square mile (426.1/km^{2}). There were 12,399 housing units at an average density of 470.9 per square mile (181.8/km^{2}). The racial makeup of the city was 85.3% White, 7.0% African American, 0.4% Native American, 1.0% Asian, 4.0% from other races, and 2.4% from two or more races. Hispanic or Latino of any race were 13.9% of the population.

There were 11,650 households, of which 31.3% had children under the age of 18 living with them, 48.4% were married couples living together, 12.1% had a female householder with no husband present, 5.3% had a male householder with no wife present, and 34.2% were non-families. 28.2% of all households were made up of individuals, and 10.8% had someone living alone who was 65 years of age or older. The average household size was 2.48 and the average family size was 3.06.

The median age in the city was 38 years. 23.1% of residents were under the age of 18; 7.9% were between the ages of 18 and 24; 28% were from 25 to 44; 26.6% were from 45 to 64; and 14.4% were 65 years of age or older. The gender makeup of the city was 48.5% male and 51.5% female.

=== 2000 census ===
As of the census of 2000, there were 25,363 people, 9,855 households, and 6,977 families residing in the city. The population density was 967.5 inhabitants per square mile (373.6/km^{2}). There were 10,299 housing units at an average density of 392.9 per square mile (151.7/km^{2}). The racial makeup of the city was 93.73% White, 1.39% African American, 0.21% Native American, 0.54% Asian, 0.02% Pacific Islander, 2.60% from other races, and 1.51% from two or more races. Hispanic or Latino of any race were 8.05% of the population.

There were 9,855 households, out of which 30.6% had children under the age of 18 living with them, 56.3% were married couples living together, 10.4% had a female householder with no husband present, and 29.2% were non-families. 24.1% of all households were made up of individuals, and 10.4% had someone living alone who was 65 years of age or older. The average household size was 2.55 and the average family size was 3.04.

In the city, the population was spread out, with 23.6% under the age of 18, 8.6% from 18 to 24, 29.7% from 25 to 44, 23.0% from 45 to 64, and 15.1% who were 65 years of age or older. The median age was 38 years. For every 100 females, there were 94.4 males. For every 100 females age 18 and over, there were 91.7 males.

The median income for a household in the city was $34,759, and the median income for a family was $35,078. Males had a median income of $43,702 versus $26,619 for females. The per capita income for the city was $21,508. 4.8% of the population and 2.9% of families were below the poverty line. Of the total population, 5.8% of those under the age of 18 and 4.6% of those 65 and older were living below the poverty line.

== Economy ==
Hobart is home to a number of businesses in its downtown shopping district, including the historic Art Theatre.

Hobart is also home to the super-regional Southlake Mall near the intersection of U.S. Route 30 and Interstate 65. and many surrounding retailers and restaurants, although most businesses along the south side of Hobart are required to list their addresses as Merrillville. This area was historically an unincorporated section of Ross Township prior to a 1993 annexation by the city of Hobart and is served by the Merrillville post office.

The nearest large airports serving Hobart are the Gary/Chicago International Airport (GYY) in Gary and Chicago Midway International Airport (MDW) and O'Hare International Airport (ORD) in nearby Chicago. The Hobart Sky Ranch Airport (3HO) is located 2 miles (3.2 km) north of the city's downtown business district.

Hobart contains three major railroads: Norfolk Southern Railway, which runs through County Line Road to Liverpool Road; Chicago, Fort Wayne and Eastern Railroad, which runs through County Line Road to Wisconsin Street; and Canadian National Railway, which runs through Colorado Street and through a portion of Hobart in the southernmost part of the area known as Ainsworth.

Hobart is also home to the Indiana Botanic Gardens, which is the nation's largest and oldest retailer of herbs. The company moved to Hobart in the mid-1990s and is located off Business Route 6. Another manufacturing concern headquartered in Hobart since 1952 is Midwest Products, a manufacturer of hobby materials and radio controlled model aircraft.

== Parks and recreation ==
Hobart welcome sign.

Hobart is home to Lake George, a popular place for people to gather to walk along the city's waterfront. Musical entertainment can be found near the clock tower in Lakefront Park and at the Revelli Bandshell during the warm months. Fishing and boating are two popular activities at Lake George. At Festival Park, people can feed the ducks that live there. In the past, fishermen fished at Hobart's Robinson Lake. In October 2006, then-Mayor Linda Buzenic announced the "highest and best use" for Robinson Lake would be to put it up for sale, according to the Post-Tribune.

The city features 14 parks, a public 18-hole golf courses (Cressmoor Country Club having closed in 2006), and many sports fields for basketball, football, baseball, soccer, rugby, and other sports. The city recently bought an outdoor swimming pool. Hobart Nature District is located in Hobart.

The Oak Savannah rails-to-trails route cuts through the city and offers biking and hiking. The Oak Savannah trail passes by the 90-acre (36 ha) Hobart Prairie Grove Unit of Indiana Dunes National Park.

The Shirley Heinze Land Trust, Inc. owns other nature preserves in the city of Hobart, including a tallgrass prairie. The Cressmoor Prairie is a dedicated state nature preserve, and is the largest state-protected rare "black soil" or silt-loam prairie in Indiana.

== Education ==
Most of the city is within the School City of Hobart, although other parts of the city are within the River Forest Community School Corporation or the Merrillville Community School District.

Hobart High School students are referred to as the "Brickies," in reference to the brickyards that were once located on city's northern side near Cressmore Prairie. The school mascot is named Yohan and bears a strong resemblance to "Boilermaker Pete" from Purdue University. Hobart High School at one time was considered a leader in music education; in the early twentieth century, its band won national Sousa band competitions under the direction of William Revelli, who later left to lead the University of Michigan band. The city is also home to Trinity Lutheran School, a pre-school through 8th grade parochial school and Montessori Academy in the Oaks.

The Merrillville section is served by John Wood Elementary School and the feeder schools in Merrillville.

The Lake County Public Library operates the Hobart Branch.

== Notable people ==
- Omar Apollo - singer-songwriter
- Larry Bigbie - professional baseball player
- Brent Dickson - Justice of the Indiana Supreme Court (1986–), Chief Justice (2012–2014)
- Darren Elkins - professional MMA fighter
- Brian Gallagher - president and chief executive officer of United Way Worldwide
- Tim Gill - computer scientist and LGBT activist
- Alex Jovanovich - artist and Artforum senior editor
- Bob Kuechenberg - professional football player
- Rudy Kuechenberg - professional football player
- Dale Messick - graphic artist, creator of comic strip Brenda Starr
- George Molchan - American spokesperson, most famous for his work as Little Oscar for the Oscar Mayer meat company
- Craig Osika - professional football player, and Hobart High School football coach
- Gary Primich - blues musician and recording artist
- William Revelli - band director, first in Hobart and later at University of Michigan
- Everett Robinson - minor league baseball player and manager

== See also ==
- Albanese Candy
- Albanese Candy Bowl
