= Shirley Heinze Land Trust =

Environmental land trust in Northwest Indiana

The Shirley Heinze Land Trust, originally known as the Shirley Heinze Environmental Fund, is a 501(c)(3) nonprofit land trust dedicated to the preservation of natural areas in Northwest Indiana. The Heinze Trust manages more than 4,000 acres of protected land in Lake, Porter, LaPorte, St. Joseph, Starke, and Marshall Counties in Indiana. Its preserves include a wide range of dune, wetland, prairie, and forest ecosystems.

Due to the heavily developed nature of the Calumet Region, many of the Heinze Trust's parcels are entirely surrounded by industrial or residential development. Many of the preserves were severely degraded when first acquired, and the Heinze Trust has engaged in a wide range of restoration activities in order to restore them to ecological viability. The Heinze Trust's preserves include six designated Indiana Nature Preserves, some of which were purchased with funds from the Indiana Heritage Trust.

== History and mission ==
The Shirley Heinze Environmental Fund was established in 1981 by an endowment from Mr. & Mrs. Robert L. Seidner. The organization was named to honor the memory of Dr. Shirley Heinze, a resident of Ogden Dunes whose efforts helped preserve the Indiana Dunes.

The mission of the organization is, "To protect habitats and ecosystems of Northwest Indiana through acquiring, restoring, and protecting environmentally significant landscapes for present and future generations, and to inspire and educate people of all ages about the value of land conservation to protect our natural world and enrich our lives."

== Preserves ==
=== Lake County ===
Bur Oak Woods (Hobart)

Cressmoor Prairie (Hobart)
Gordon & Faith Greiner (Hobart)
Green Heron Pond (Gary)

Ivanhoe South (Gary)
Miller Dunes (Gary)

Seidner Dune & Swale (Hammond)

=== Porter County ===
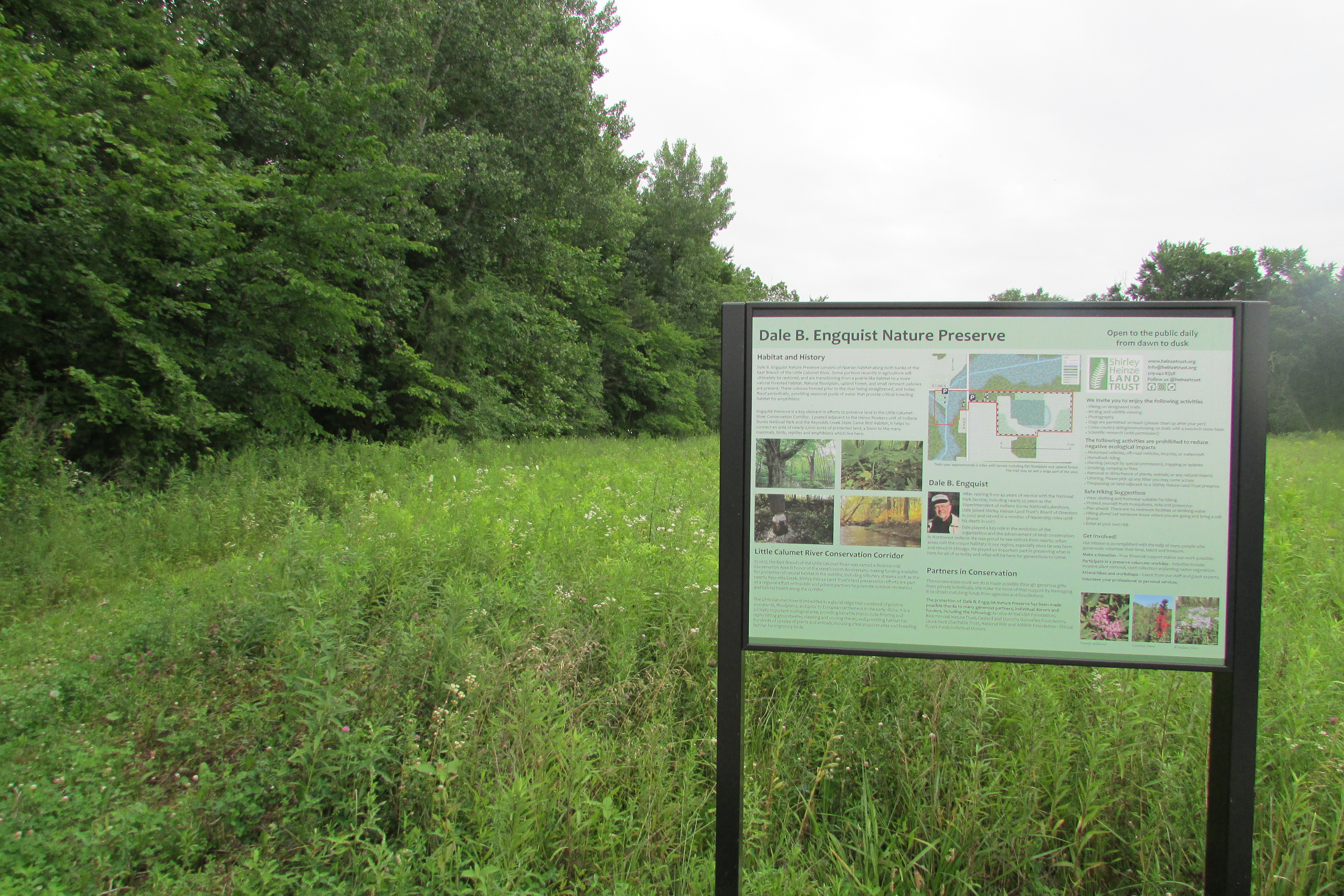
Dale B. Engquist

Father Basil Moreau (Pines)
John Merle Coulter Sand Prairie (Portage)
Keith Richard Walner (Chesterton)
Great Marsh (Beverly Shores)

Dale B. Engquist (Chesterton)
Meadowbrook (Valparaiso)
J. Timothy Ritchie (Chesterton)
Walnut Woods (Valparaiso)
Wykes-Plampin (Chesterton)

=== LaPorte County ===
Ambler Flatwoods (Michigan City)
Barker Woods (Michigan City)
Hildebrand Lake (Westville)

=== St. Joseph County ===
Lydick Bog (South Bend)

== Programs ==
Public programs range from volunteer work/restoration activities, educational hikes, to introductory visits to the nature preserves.

- ’’Educational Hikes’’ are seasonally based and presented by experts in the various natural fields. Topics range from bird behavior & identification, to wildflower identification & habitats, to entomology.
- ’’Special Events’’ includes workday events, photography hikes, birding festivals and volunteer appreciation luncheons.

== Works cited ==
- Adelman, Charlotte (2013). Prairie Directory of North America. p. 117. ISBN 9780195366952.
- Schoon, Kenneth J. (2013). Dreams of Duneland: A Pictorial History of the Indiana Dunes Region. ISBN 9780253007988.
