= List of communities in Porter County, Indiana =

There are several townships in Porter County, Indiana. Within each of the townships are several towns or cities or other type of named communities.

There are many "lost" towns, a group of places whose names are still commonly used by county residents. Each may have had one time a post office, a store that served a part of the county, a grain elevator used by farmers to ship their crops, a rail station, or a development that was or may still remain a unique designation. There may be a residential association or some other legal body devoted to the area. More often, these communities are communities of people who still refer to their homes by these geographic designations.

== Townships, municipalities and census-designated places ==
Porter County has 12 townships, and numerous municipalities and census-designated places.

== Other Communities ==
=== Aylesworth ===
Located in Boone Township, 4 miles (6.4 km) east of Hebron, Aylesworth is still an active grain elevator of the Cargill Corporation. The elevator is located on County Road 250 West at Indiana Route 8. The community was named for a local family and grew up around a flag stop on the Pittsburgh, Cincinnati, Chicago and St. Louis Railroad. The community appears on only two county atlases, 1906 and 1921.

=== Babcock ===
Babcock is a residential community in Liberty Township. It is located County Road 200 West where they cross the Baltimore and Ohio Railroad, which is today operated by CSX. This small village once included a railroad station and sidetrack. The station was first opened by the Baltimore & Ohio Railroad as a shipping point for milk in January 1889, as well as a pumping station for locomotives. A grocery store operated by Thomas Jeffrey Clevenger was also located near the station at Babcock, which, for a period of time, included a post office. The post office at Babcock was opened on January 7, 1889, and ceased operations on November 14, 1904. Thomas Jeffrey Clevenger was Babcock's first and only postmaster. In the 1880s through about 1920 the area surrounding and including Babcock was commonly referred to as Whipporwill Prairie.

=== Baillytown ===
Baillytown
- Interactive map of Baillytown
- Coordinates: 41.63°N 87.108°W
- Founded: 1833
- Changed: 1876
- Location: U.S. 12 west of Steel Mill and Power Plant entrance
- Nearest City: Porter, Indiana

Platted by Joseph Bailly in 1833, north of Chesterton, where the Arcelor/Mittal (previously Bethlehem) Steel mill is located. Joseph Bailly had a group of French Canadians planning on settling in the dunes. When he became ill in 1835, he wrote to these families and recommended that they not journey to the shores of Lake Michigan. The development of a new settlement in the wilderness would be compounded by their lack of English and their lack of experience living among Indians.

=== Beatrice ===
Beatrice developed along the Chesapeake and Ohio Railway. Little remains of the community. The area has become a part of the residential development on the west side of Lake Eliza.

=== Beverly Hill ===
Beverly Hill is a name seldom used. It refers to the steep rise on U.S. 6, 6 miles (9.7 km) east of Indiana 49. The highway passes through the upper reaches of the Coffee Creek valley and then climbs to the top of the Valparaiso Moraine.

=== Blackhawk Beach ===
In 1865, Richard Lytle built a fishing camp on the southeast edge of Flint Lake. His camp become known as the Blackhawk Beach. Later the fishing camp grew with an ice house and hotel.

=== Brummitt Acres ===
Brummit Acres remains a local name in Chesterton for a housing development located on Brummitt Road between Indian Boundary Road (County Road 1275 North) and Country Road 1300 North. Brummitt Elementary School, Duneland School Corporation, is at the intersection of Indian Boundary and Brummitt Roads.

=== Burdick ===
Burdick is still a residential community in Jackson Township. It's a railroad community, where Burdick Road crosses the New York Central, today operated by Norfolk Southern at County Road 500 E. This small village once included a station located along the Michigan Southern & Northern Indiana Railroad (1876) about one-half mile south of the intersection of present-day 575 East and Burdick Road. The original plat of the town included nine lots located south of the railroad tracks. A wood yard for the railroad was located across the tracks from the platted village. There were seven houses, a boarding house, a small general store, and a pump house located about one-quarter mile east of the village that was used water locomotives on the New York Central Railroad.

=== Burlington Beach ===
Burlington Beach
- Interactive map of Burlington Beach
- Coordinates: 41.510°N 87.041°W
- Founded: 1862
- Changed: before 1957
- Location: East shore of Flint Lake; Site of the Valparaiso Water Plant.
- Nearest City: Valparaiso, Indiana

In 1862, George Merrill built fishing and boating resort on the Shore of Flint Lake. He called it Burlington Beach. In 1902, Charles Specht purchased the property and built a larger facility that he called ’’The Willows Resort’’. Today, a community association operates a resident’s only beach on the last remaining ‘public’ shoreline of the resort. About the turn of the century (1900), Mr John McQuiston owned the east side of Flint Lake, including the Burlington Beach area. He built a resort and named it Sheridan Beach Hotel. He operated steam launches on Flint and Long Lakes. On the site of the old Burlington Beach Willows, a 50-room hotel was constructed in 1905 by McQuiston. In 1906, he sold it to Sigmund Freund of Chicago and renovated the hotel. In 1925, the Kilmer-Frasier company purchased the Sheridan Beach Resort and renamed it Blackhawk Beach Summer Resort. They expanded the facility to include a toboggan slide, concession stands, roller skating rink and a larger picnic ground.

=== City West ===
City West was a community of 15-20 households platted at the mouth of Fort Creek, in the present-day Indiana Dunes State Park. Founded and platted in 1836, it collapsed in the aftermath of the panic of 1837, and was fully abandoned by 1839. The remaining buildings were destroyed by fire in 1854.

=== Clanricarde ===
41°17′18″N 86°56′58″W

Clanricarde was founded in 1865 as a railroad siding on the Chicago and Erie Railroad. It is recorded in county plats in 1876 through 1896. By 1921, J.C. Burke owned the grain elevator serving the surrounding farms. By 1935, the community remains identified on area maps, but there is no evidence that the grain elevator was still in operation.

=== Coburg ===
41°31′08″N 86°56′58″W

Coburg was a stop on the Baltimore and Ohio Railroad. Located in Washington Township, Coburg is identified as the crossing on Country Road 600 East, just below Country Road 600 N. Once west of Indiana Route 2, it is now east of that road, after it was moved in the mid-20th Century. The land on which the village was erected was originally owned by Jacob T. Forbes. Forbes named the village Coburg after a town he had resided in for many years in Ontario, Canada, of the same name. A post office, officially named Coburgh, was opened in this village on May 8, 1876, and ceased operation on January 15, 1906, with service transferred to Westville. The first postmaster appointed to the post office was Hamilton W. Forbes, son of Jacob T. Forbes.

=== Coolwood Acres ===
Coolwood Acres is a residential community of 261 people on the southwest side of Valparaiso. It is outside the city limits but served by the Valparaiso Community Schools.

=== Crestview ===
Crestview is a local name in Center Township for a housing development that is located on a rise above Sager Creek. Except for the trees, there would be a view of Valparaiso. It is south of Morthland Drive, a.k.a. U.S. 30. It is south of the junction of City View Drive and Sager Road. No information has been found to validate that this name was more than a housing development.

=== Crisman ===
Crisman was named for Benjamin G. Crisman, owner of surrounding property, who immigrated to Porter County in 1850 at the age of 34. The village was platted by Dr. Robert E. Miller, M.D., a Hobart physician, in June 1876. The community grew up along the Michigan Central Railroad, which became the Norfolk and Western Railroad. A post office began service here on May 15, 1871, with Isaac Crisman (1871–1875) appointed as the first postmaster. The post office ceased operation on August 31, 1933. Other early postmasters of this post office were Charles Seydel (1875–1877), Shepard Sargeant (1877–1878), Joseph Bender (1878–1879), Joseph White (1879–1880, 1883–1886), F. M. Joslin (1880–1881), L. R. Heaton (1881–1883), and Oscar Field (1886–1888). The community was incorporated along with McCool, and Garyton to create the City of Portage. The community is centered on the intersection of Portage Ave (County Road 1050 North) and Crisman Road, also known as County Road 550 West and further north as Indiana 249. Various maps of the area spell the village name as Crisman Station, Crissmn, and Crissman Station.

=== Crocker ===
Crocker grew up around the junction of two railroads, the Wabash and the Elgin, Joliet and Eastern (EJ&E). In 1891, Charles LaHayne sold a portion of his land to the Wabash Railroad. Within a few years, the EJ&E bought some land next to that. From these two purchases, business prospects improved and La Haven opened the first saloon. Gottlieb Grieger then opened the first grocery, which included the post office. The town prospered and soon there was a tomato canning factory, ‘Quaker Canning and Preserving Company’ (1899) . Today the town is an unincorporated community in Liberty Township. It is located on the western boundary of the township, across Indiana 149 from the City of Portage on County Road 1050 N.

=== Edgewater ===
Edgewater is a beach community on the north shore of Flint Lake. In 1890, Howard Dickover purchased the entire area and put a resort hotel on the lake, naming it ‘Edgewater Beach’. In 1910, the Valparaiso and Northern Railway (Interurban) passed around Flint Lake and an Edgewater station was constructed. Today, the only remaining evidence of the resort is the ‘resident association beach’.

=== Five Points Corner ===
Five Points Corner is in Pleasant Township where Baum’s Bridge Road cuts diagonally through the intersection of County Road 150 East and County Road 700 South.

=== Furnessville ===
Furnessville
- Interactive map of Furnessville
- Coordinates: 41.650°N 87.010°W
- Founded: 1861
- Changed: 1921
- Location: U.S. 20 at Kemil Road
- Nearest City: Beverly Shores, Indiana

The Furnessville Post Office opened in 1861. It began as the Murray’s Side Track, then became known as Morgan’s Side track. In 1853, the first house was built and a store followed. Furnessville got its name from the first postmaster, Edwin Leigh Furness (1832–1916). There was the ‘Furnessville Station of the Michigan Central Railway by 1876. Later in 1896, it was noted as the Furnessville Triangle and School No. 3. By 1921, the only structures remaining were residential homes with outbuildings and the school.

=== Garyton ===
Garyton is identified as a community within the City of Portage. Today, two subdivisions north of Stone Avenue (County Road 900 North) and east of Willowcreek Road carry the name.

=== Graham Woods ===
Graham Woods remains a local name in Chesterton for a housing development located north of Indian Boundary Road (County Road 1275 North), a mile east of its junction with State Route 49. No information has been found to validate that this name was more than a housing development.

=== Haglund ===
Haglund was an independent residential community in Westchester Township. It became a part of Burns Harbor when the community was incorporated.

=== Hillcrest ===
Hillcrest is one of the several lake communities north of Valparaiso. It is between Flint Lake on the east and Loomis Lake on the west.

=== Hurlburt ===
Hurlburt developed along the Chicago and Erie Railroad, some 2.5 miles (4.0 km) northwest of Boone Grove. In 1910, there were 100 residents and two generals stores. Little remains on the community, except the noticeable northwest to southeast angle of County Road 450 South between County Roads 600 West and 500 West.

=== Lake Eliza ===
Lake Eliza is not a lost community, but rather an identifiable community. Located in Porter Township, south of Division Road at County Road 600 West, Lake Eliza is a substantial residential community centered on Lake Eliza. In 1838, the lake was called Fish Lake, but was changed to Lake Eliza after 1841.

=== Lincoln Hills ===
Originally the area bordered by Joliet (original Lincoln hwy.) and tower road, was known as the Lincolndale Country Club (1928). The land was developed into now what is Lincoln Hill subdivision. The Lenoard school house could be found just west of tower road on the south side of Joliet rd. The steps to the school can still be found today (2017).

=== Porter Crossroads ===
A very small village located along present-day Indiana State Road 2. The name of the village was likely derived from the fact that three different roads intersected at this location. A school was located approximately one-half mile west of the cross roads. A post office began operation here under the name Porters Cross Roads on May 1, 1844, with Aaron Servis appointed as the first postmaster (1844–1850, 1855–1859). The post office ceased operations on August 19, 1873. Besides Servis, other postmasters of this post office were David Luddington (1850–1855, 1859–1863, 1864–1866, 1868–1870), Edwin J. Green (1863–1864, 1870–1873), and Charles J. Bell (1866–1868).

=== Prattville ===
Prattville was located along the Indian Trail, which is now the line of travel for Indiana 2. It is shown to be at the crossing of the Grand Trunk Railway and Route 2 in Washington Township. This is also the location of Chiqua’s Town. Thomas Pratt, Wilson Malone, and Lyman Beach created Prattville in 1841. At that time, there were already a tavern and a shoemaker.

=== Roble Woods ===
Roble Woods is a residential community in Center Township. It is a part of the lake communities on the northside of Valparaiso. It developed from the resort community to the south "Hillcrest" and "Flint Lake". It is located on the west shore of Long Lake and reached from Meridian/Campbell Road on County Road 600 N.

=== Sedley ===
Located in Union Township, Sedley was a post office on the Grand Trunk Railroad where it crosses Country Road 475 West. The Miller House, built in 1923 is a significant structure remaining in the community after the Post Office closed with the introduction of Rural Free Delivery.

=== Suman ===
Suman Valley is today a wildlife refuge. The old community of Suman was stop along the Baltimore and Ohio Railroad. It's located on County Road 750 North where it connects County Road 350 East to Country Road 300 East.

=== Sylvan Manor ===
Sylvan Manor is a local name in Center Township for a housing development. It was first developed in the early 1960s by Ron Coolman Sr. and was filled with the "who's who" of the day. Sylvan Manor is still an upscale development sporting a lake and spacious park. Sylvan Manor is located south of U.S. 30 and is 2 miles west of Indiana State Road 2 in Valparaiso, Indiana. No information has been found to validate that this name was more than a housing development.

=== Tratebas Mill ===
Is not actually a community as much as a landmark. Christian Long and his son John built the mill in 1887 on Coffee Creek, where Tratebas Road and Country Road 250 East join. A mill pond was created south of Tratebas Road and the mill was located on the north side of the road. After the Longs owned it, it was owned by Charles Rolfe. The last owner was John Tratebas Jr., who owned the mill 1920–26. It was not used as a mill after that. It was owned by the City of Valparaiso until 1939 when it was bought by N.E. and Jenny Hopkins. They used it as a summer residence and renovated for a full-time residence in 1957. The Hopkins family still owned the property in 2015.

=== Tremont ===
Tremont
- Interactive map of Tremont
- Coordinates: 41.66°N 87.04°W
- Founded: 1833
- Changed: 1876
- Location: U.S. 12 and Tremont Road
- Nearest City: Porter, Indiana

Tremont was located where the South Shore Line, an interurban line, provided access to the Indiana Dunes. The Prairie Club made this station well known. It was the stop for their beach house built on the shore of Lake Michigan.

=== Wake Robin Fields ===
Wake Robin is a local name in Chesterton for a housing development located south of Indian Boundary Road (County Road 1275 North), a mile east of its junction with State Route 49. No information has been found to validate that this name was more than a housing development.

=== Woodville ===
Woodville
- Interactive map of Woodville
- Coordinates: 41.563°N 87.042°W
- Founded: 1908
- Changed: 1938
- Location: Located along Old State Route 49, just west and south of where the Baltimore and Ohio Railroad crossing is located.
- Nearest City: Chesterton, Indiana

Best known as the Junction on the Interurban lines. In 1908, the Valparaiso and Northern Railway was incorporated to provide a link from Valparaiso to the Chicago-New York Electric Air Line Railroad. The Chicago and New York ran only from LaPorte the 15 miles (24 km) to the junction with the V&N by 1911. The V&N was to reach north to Chesterton by only reach Flint Lake by 1910. By 1912, regular service was passing through Woodville. With the decline in rail service, the service to Woodville ended in 1938.
