= Calumet Region =

Geographic area in northwest Indiana and northeast Illinois, United States

Coordinates: 41.55°N 87.45°W

The Calumet Region is the geographic area drained by the Grand Calumet River and the Little Calumet River of northeastern Illinois and northwestern Indiana in the United States. It is part of the Great Lakes Basin, which eventually reaches the Atlantic Ocean. It is a sub-region of the greater Northwest Indiana region and the even larger Great Lakes region.

This region includes the northern parts of Lake and Porter counties and the western portion of La Porte county in Indiana, as well as the eastern counties of northern Illinois, Will and Cook.

Since much of this region is on the south shore of Lake Michigan, it is sometimes referred to as the "South Shore". Because it was initially cut off from the rest of the state due to natural geographic barriers like the Kankakee Marsh to the south, the Calumet Region was the last-settled portion of Indiana.

The area is known for its industrial heritage and history as a center for production of steel, minerals and chemicals. The toxic byproducts of these industries present major issues for public safety and natural resource management today. The region was a center for the labor rights movement of the 1930s. The Memorial Day massacre of 1937, where ten steelworkers' rights activists were killed by police officers during a demonstration, occurred on Chicago's southeast side.

Today, Calumet is notable as a site of many habitat restoration projects. The area contains many endangered dune, Swale, and moraine based ecosystems. Many Forest Preserve District of Cook County sites, such as Powderhorn Prairie, 95th/Dan Ryan Woods, and Eggers Grove are being restored under the care of volunteer stewards. In addition, nonprofit groups partner with the Forest Preserve District and Chicago Park District to complete larger-scale restoration projects. Major partners include The Field Museum, the Wetlands Initiative, and local branches of The Nature Conservancy, Green Corps and the Student Conservation Association. Many of these sites have become host to locally rare and threatened species like Blanding's turtle, Wilson's phalarope and the least weasel.

== Cities ==
The Calumet Region includes the Indiana cities of Gary, East Chicago, Hammond, Highland, Griffith, Munster, Merrillville, Schererville, Hobart, Whiting, Crown Point, Dyer, Saint John, and Valparaiso.

In Illinois a number of cities and villages lie in the Calumet watershed including: the southernmost part of Chicago, Lansing, Calumet City, South Holland, Riverdale, Burnham, Calumet Park, and Blue Island

== Townships ==
The Calumet Region includes land from the following Indiana townships in Porter County: Portage, Union, Westchester, Liberty, Center, Pine, Jackson, Washington. It includes land located within the following townships of Lake County: North, St. John, Calumet, Hobart, and Ross. It also includes Coolspring Township in La Porte County.

== Origin ==
The name Calumet is said to come from French interpretations of either the Potawatomi name for the rivers and lake in question (“low body of deep, still water”) or is a corruption of the Old French term Chalemel, which means "reed". The word appears on early maps as Cal-La-Mick, Kil-La-Mick, Calumic, etc.

== History ==
Historical population
Census	Pop.	Note	%±
1890	96,371		—
1900	120,193		24.7%
1910	172,749		43.7%
1920	254,761		47.5%
1930	367,850		44.4%
1940	409,813		11.4%
1950	513,073		25.2%
1960	699,003		36.2%
1970	770,744		10.3%
1980	792,395		2.8%
1990	750,103		−5.3%
2000	786,077		4.8%
2010	819,537		4.3%
2015 (est.)	813,915		−0.7%
U.S. Decennial Census (Calumet Region in Indiana)

The first known print reference to refer to this area as a distinct geographical region is the 1755 map created by John Mitchell. In this map, however, he referred to the geographic region as "Quadoche", a name that the Iroquois had given to the Potawatomi that were known to occupy the region at that point in time.

== See also ==
- Ceremonial pipe - aka "Calumet" in French, colonial-era terminology
- Wolf Lake (Indiana–Illinois)
