= Tassinong, Indiana =

- Community
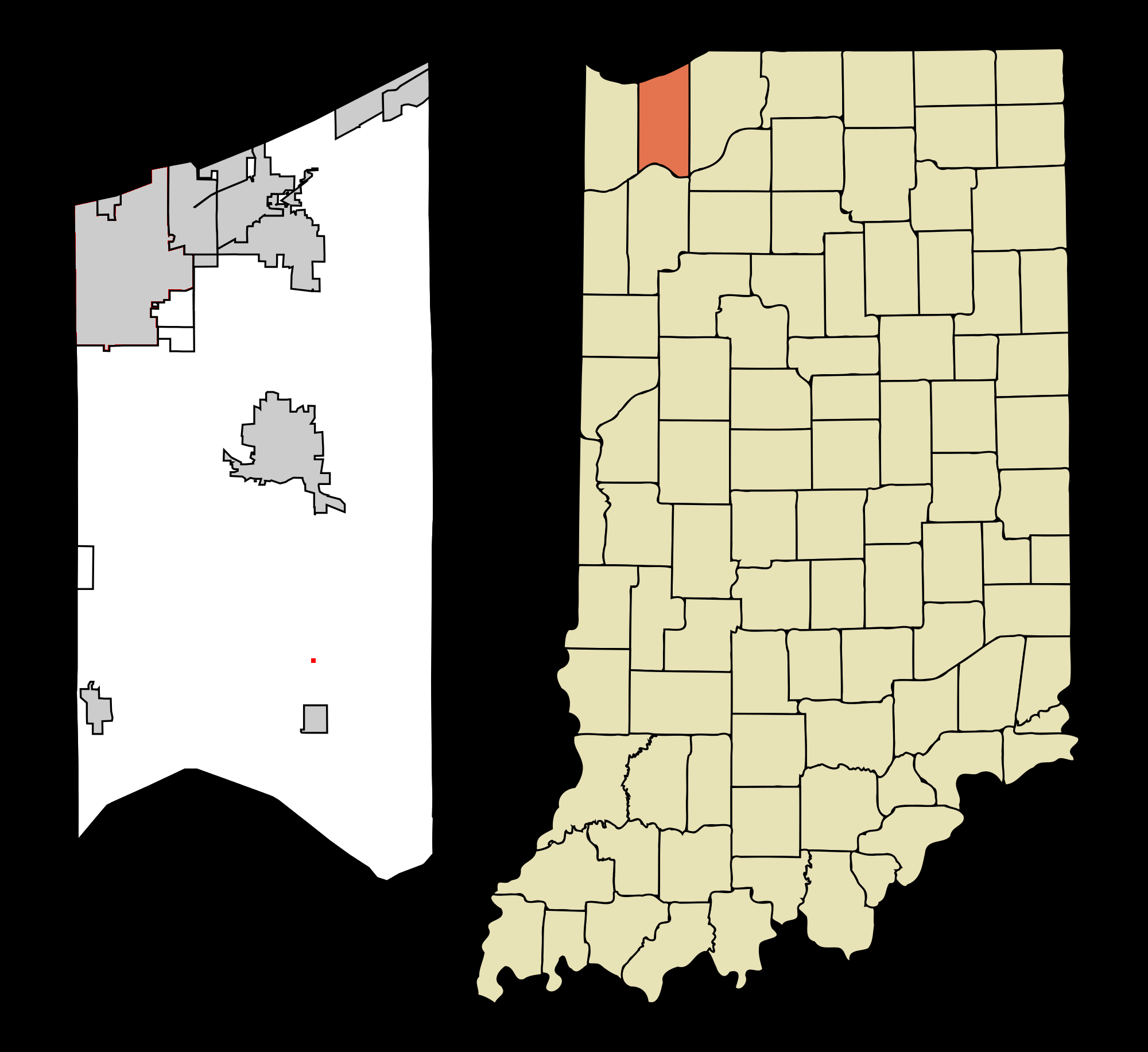
- Map of Porter County, Indiana with an inset showing the location of the community of Tassinong
- Coordinates: 41°20′0.981″N 87°1′0.674″W
- Country: United States
- State: Indiana
- County: Porter
- Township: Morgan

Area
  - Total: 0.010 sq mi (0.026 km^{2})
  - Land: 0.010 sq mi (0.026 km^{2})
  - Water: 0 sq mi (0.0 km^{2})
- Elevation: 695 ft (211.8 m)

Population (2010)
  - Total: 15
- Time zone: UTC-6 (CST)
  - Summer (DST): UTC-5 (CDT)
- ZIP code: 46302
- Area code: 219

Tassinong is an unincorporated rural community in Porter County, Indiana, south of the city of Valparaiso. The community includes an historic marker claiming it to be a French mission and trading post in 1673, which would make it the oldest European settlement in Indiana as well as in neighboring Illinois.

== History ==
The first use of the word Tassinong appears in 1830, referring to a village of Potawatomi Indians. The earlier existence of an Indian village and a French trading post are identified by an historic marker in Tassinong. The earliest presence of Europeans in the Porter County area is in 1679, when Sieur de La Salle passed down the Kankakee River, 7 miles (11 km) to the south. At that time, the area south of Lake Michigan was embroiled in the Beaver Wars, which began in the Iroquois lands of New York in 1638. Iroquois war parties had destroyed the Erie Nation by 1656 and had moved west into the western Great Lakes by 1670

In 1689, the Miami, with aid from the Anishinaabe Confederacy (Odawa, Potawatomi, and Ojibwa) defeated the Iroquois near modern South Bend. That began a return migration of Potawatomi peoples to the lands around the St. Joseph River with over 200 warriors and their families coming to the St. Joseph valley by 1695. The arrival of a settlement occurred in 1834, four years existence of a Potawatomi village. The village may have taken its name from the nearby woodlands, Tassinong Grove. A post office began operations at Tassinong Grove on April 10, 1838. Tassinong Grove was located two miles (3.2 km) south of the community of Tassinong. By 1846, the community and post office had moved north to the location where the Baum's Bridge Road joined the road to Valparaiso, modern Indiana State Road 49. In that year, several businesses are listed, including two stores, two blacksmiths, a carpenter, a tavern and a shoemaker. A church was built in 1855 by the Presbyterians. The decline of the village began in 1865 when the Pittsburgh, Cincinnati and St. Louis Railroad was built through Kouts, two miles (3.2 km) to the south.

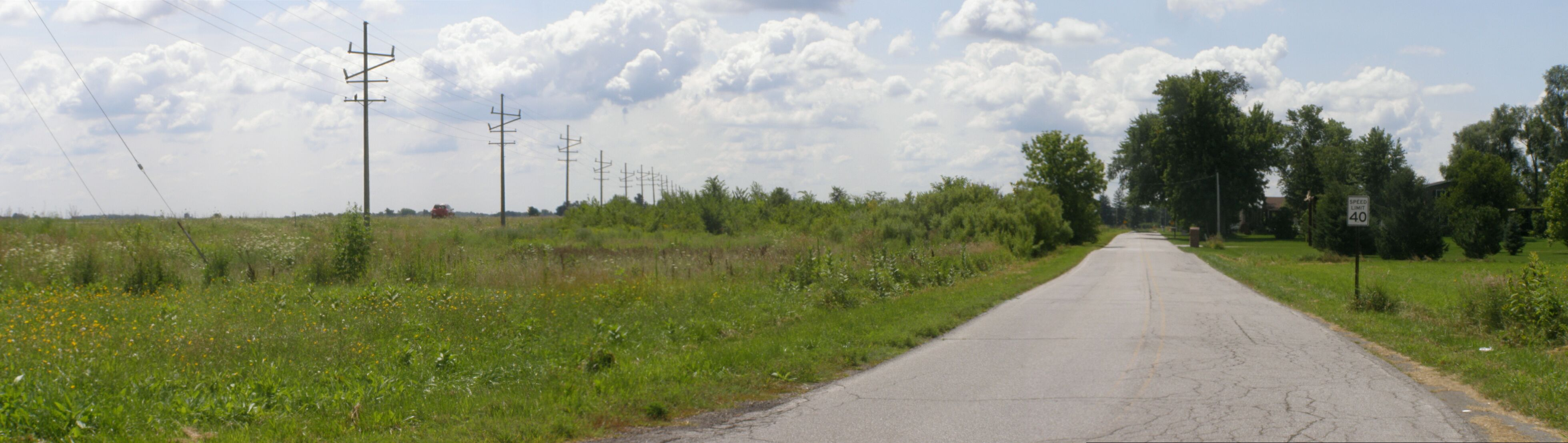
Photograph of the area of the community of Tassinong

== Location ==
The location of Tassinong first appeared on a map in 1875, when the state of Indiana completed its survey of Morgan and Pleasant townships in Porter County. A trail is shown leading from the Potawatomi Ford at modern Baum's Bridge along the Baum's Bridge Road to the area of Tassinong, then heading north towards Valparaiso. The oldest available Atlas of Porter County, 1876, shows the village of Tassinong in the southeast quarter of Section 31, Township 34, Range 5.

== Schools ==
Tassinong is in East Porter County School Corporation. The high school is Morgan Township High School, located north of Malden on State Route 49.

== Transportation ==
State Route 49 goes north past Valparaiso to end at the Indiana Dunes State Park on Lake Michigan and south to State Route 14 in central Jasper County.

== Controversy ==
On June 13, 1960, a brass plaque was unveiled in Tassinong to commemorate the long history of the site. The marker reads, Oldest Village in Northern Indiana * A French mission and Trading Post – 1673 - Post Office Established – 1837 * John Jones, P.M. * Incorporated as a Village 1852 by Joseph Bartholomew and Jesse Spencer. It was created and placed through the efforts of the historical society of Porter County, Duneland Historical Society. The controversy revolves around the 1673 date for a French mission and trading post. No documentation has been found that predates 1915.

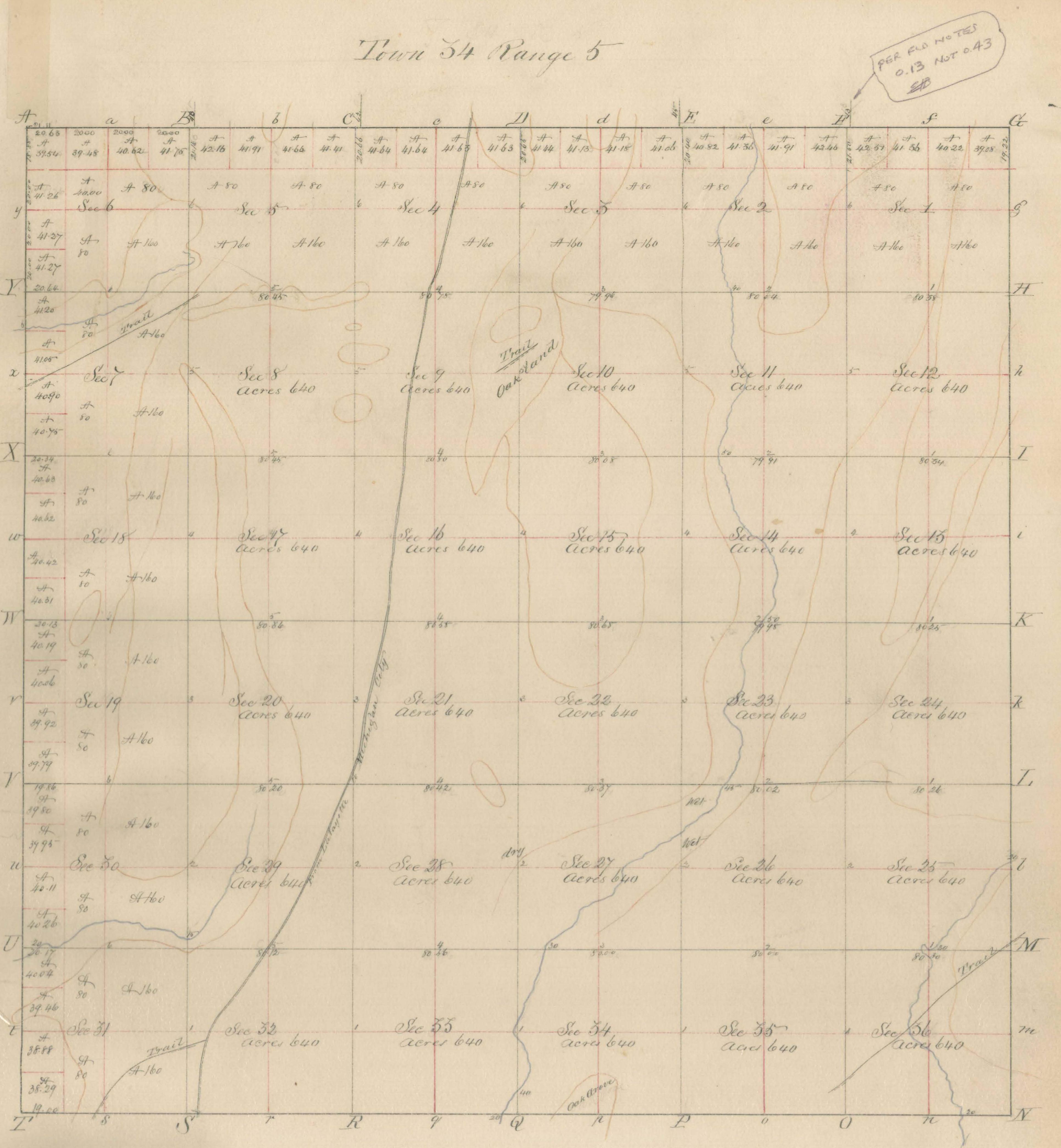
Scanned copy of the original 1875 Indiana Survey of Porter County, Morgan Township, T34, R5.

In 1915, Hubert Skinner, then president of the Porter County Historical Society, wrote an article in the Indiana Magazine of History, showing the origin of the word Tassinong from the French word Tassement. In the following issue, P. Dunn of Indiana University, Bloomington, refuted the assertion that Tassinong could be derived from Tassement. The implication of the Skinner article was conclusive proof that they (the local Indians) derived the word from the French and passed it on, establishing a French presence at that location. Skinner wrote a counter rebutal afterwards and nothing further was heard.

In 1934, A.J. Bowser wrote Tasssinong and Kouts for the local newspaper. Here he introduced the name Bengal as a prior name for the area, while supporting the Dunn argument that there is no proof of a French connection. The Kouts High School History of Pleasant Township was published in the local paper in 1936, establishing the presence of Claude-Jean Allouez, Claude Dablon, Father Jacques Marquette, and René-Robert Cavelier, Sieur de La Salle in Porter County, passing "through this territory on foot". No mention of Tassinong for any French post was made.

The Stroller was a local columnist during the 1950s and 1960s who wrote extensively in the newspaper about Porter County and its history. In 1957, he picked up the story of Tassinong. He identified that Fathers Allouez, Chardon, and D’Ablon (Dablon) preached at Tassinong and that, in 1875, Sylvester Pierre, the Tassinong postmaster provided an extensive history for the village, including that it was originally called Sequada Tiera by the Spanish, and then Haute Terre by the French. By 1700, it was Tassament de Benevole, becoming Benevole in 1763 when the English occupied the site. Then, in 1781, it appeared as Tassnaugh. He further wrote that the French post was burned in the 1700s by the English and had also been conquered by the Spanish for two weeks sometime in the 1700s. Specific dates were not given. He confirmed the return of the Potawatomi in the early 1800s and establishment of the first store in 1846.

The interest in Tassinong continued in 1959, when the Porter County Historical Society began discussions about placing an historic marker at the site. According to a newspaper article by Henry Rankin (reported living in 1882), the history of the site included:

- It was located 5.5 miles (8.9 km) above the ford and was used by ‘illegal Coureurs de bois’ and Indians as an illegal buying place.
- An Indian-English officer with a party of Ottawa witnessed the eating of "La Damonsal", a Miami.
- It was first known as Tassinong Grove and covered several square miles.
- Until 1821, it was a trading place called Bengal, near J. N. Anderson's place. Daniel Scott was the trader and had previously worked for Joseph Bailly. (American Fur Company).
- There was a post office called Tassinong.
- Hubert Skinner searched state archives and found it was Tassament Grove (Fr), but locally called Tassinong.
- Early settlers found charred logs and debris of a structure.
- In 1846, Harper, Unruh, Eaton, McCarthy, Rinker, and Wright established log cabins.
- In 1840, the post office was established.

Based on this evidence, the brass historic marker was erected at Tassinong, commemorating the 200-year history.
