= Porter County, Indiana =

County in Indiana, United States

Porter County
- County
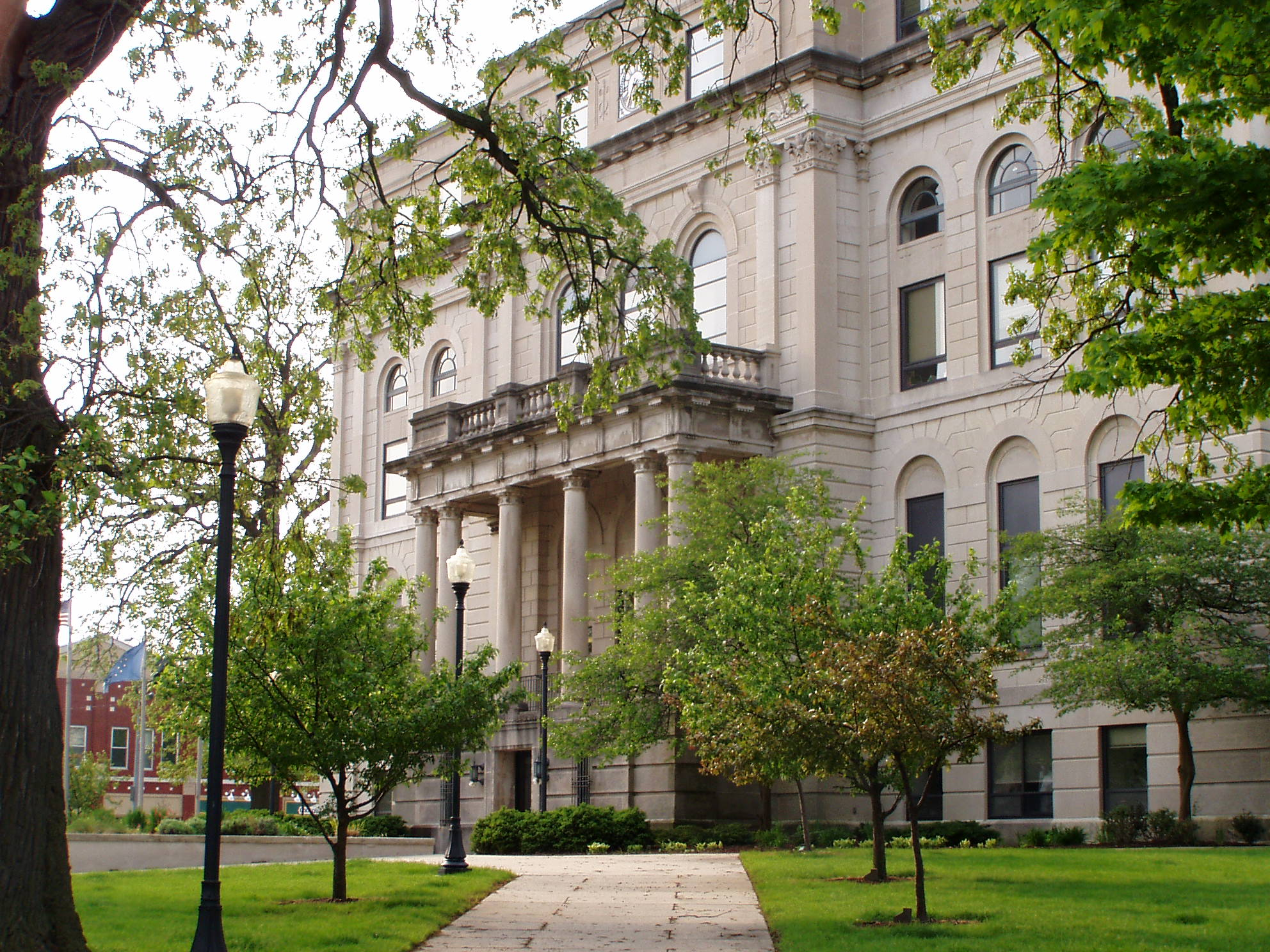
- Porter County Courthouse in Valparaiso

- Flag Seal
- Motto: Front Porch of the Dunes
- Location in the state of Indiana

- Indiana's location in the United States
- Coordinates: 40°51′N 87°07′W
- Country: United States
- State: Indiana
- Region: Northwest Indiana
- Metro area: Chicago Metropolitan
- Established: 1837
- Named for: David Porter
- County seat: Valparaiso
- Largest city: Portage (population and area)
- Incorporated municipalities: 11 cities and towns: Beverly Shores (town); Burns Harbor (town); Chesterton (town); Dune Acres (town); Hebron (town); Kouts (town); Ogden Dunes (town); Portage (city); Porter (town); Town of Pines (town); Valparaiso (city)

Government
  - Type: County

Area
  - County: 521.8 sq mi (1,351 km^{2})
  - Land: 418.2 sq mi (1,083 km^{2})
  - Water: 103.6 sq mi (268 km^{2})
  - Metro: 10,874 sq mi (28,160 km^{2})
  - Rank: 29th-largest county in Indiana
  - Region: 2,726 sq mi (7,060 km^{2})
- Elevation (mean): 843 ft (257 m)
- Highest elevation – NE Jackson Twp: 870 ft (270 m)
- Lowest elevation – at Lake Michigan: 585 ft (178 m)

Population (2020)
  - County: 173,215
  - Estimate (2025): 176,049 ▲
  - Rank: 9th largest county in Indiana; 374th-largest county in U.S.
  - Density: 414.2/sq mi (159.9/km^{2})
  - Metro: 9,522,434
  - Region: 819,537
- Time zone: UTC−6 (Central)
  - Summer (DST): UTC−5 (Central)
- ZIP Codes: 46301-02, 46304, 46307-08, 46341-42, 46347, 46360, 46368, 46383-85, 46391, 46393
- Area code: 219
- Congressional district: 1st
- Indiana Senate districts: 4th, 5th and 6th
- Indiana House of Representatives districts: 3rd, 4th, 10th, 19th and 20th
- FIPS code: 18-127
- GNIS feature ID: 0450382
- Airport: Porter County Regional
- Waterways: East Arm Little Calumet River; Kankakee River; Lake Michigan; Little Calumet River; Port of Indiana-Burns Harbor; Salt Creek
- South Shore Line stations: Beverly Shores – Dune Park Portage/Ogden Dunes
- Public transit: V-Line
- Website: www.portercountyin.gov
- Indiana county number 64

Porter County is a county in the U.S. state of Indiana. As of 2020, its population was 173,215, making it the 10th-most-populous county in Indiana. The county seat is Valparaiso. The county is part of Northwest Indiana, as well as the Chicago metropolitan area. Porter County is the site of much of the Indiana Dunes, an area of ecological significance. The Hour Glass Museum in Ogden Dunes documents the region's ecological significance.

== History ==
The Porter County area was occupied by an Algonquian people dubbed Huber-Berrien. This subsistence culture arrived after the glaciers retreated around 15,000 years ago and the rise of glacial Lake Algonquian, 4–8,000 years ago. The native people of this area were next recorded during the Iroquois Wars (1641–1701) as being Potawatomi and Miami. The trading post system used by the French and then the English encouraged native people to live in central villages along major waterways. Therefore, no villages are recorded within Porter County's current boundaries. Chiqua's town and Tassinong did not appear on maps and in records until 1830. Chiqua's town is a mile east of Valparaiso on State Route 2, the old Sauk Trail. Tassinong is south of Valparaiso about 5 miles (8.0 km) on State Route 49 at Baum's Bridge Road, the main route across the Great Kankakee Marsh.

After the American Revolutionary War established U.S. sovereignty over the territory of the Upper Midwest, the new federal government defined the Northwest Territory in 1787, which included the area of present-day Indiana. In 1800, Congress separated Ohio from the Northwest Territory, designating the rest of the land as the Indiana Territory. President Thomas Jefferson chose William Henry Harrison as the governor of the territory, and Vincennes was established as the capital. After the Michigan Territory was separated and the Illinois Territory was formed, Indiana was reduced to its current size and geography. By December 1816, the Indiana Territory was admitted to the Union as a state.

The Indiana State Legislature passed an omnibus county bill on February 7, 1835, that authorized the creation of 13 counties in northeast Indiana, including Porter. In 1837, the county was organized. It was named for Capt. David Porter, naval officer during the Barbary Wars and the War of 1812.

In 1962, Bethlehem Steel built a large, integrated steel mill on the shores of Lake Michigan, which is now owned and operated by Cleveland-Cliffs. The construction of the mill, as well as the neighboring Port of Indiana, generated enormous controversy between industrial interests and locals who wanted to conserve the natural shoreline and habitat. Although the activists lost and the steel mill and port were constructed, the U.S. Congress created the Indiana Dunes National Lakeshore in 1966 to protect the area's unique natural habitat.

== Geography ==
Porter County lies on the northern edge of Indiana; its northern border is formed by Lake Michigan and its southern border is formed by the westward-flowing Kankakee River. Its once-tree-covered, low, rolling hills have been cleared and devoted to agriculture; the only exceptions in Porter County are the drainages carved into the terrain, which are brush-filled. The East Arm Little Calumet River flows westward through the upper portion of Porter County. The highest point, at 870 feet (270 m), is a small hill on the county's east border, 2.75 miles (4.4 km) northwest of Westville. The lowest point, around 585 feet (178 m), is along the Lake Michigan shoreline (exact elevation varies due to variation in lake level). According to the 2010 census, the county has an area of 521.78 square miles (1,351.4 km^{2}), of which 103.63 square miles (268.4 km^{2}) (or 19.9%) are covered by water, most of it in Lake Michigan.

=== Adjacent counties ===
- LaPorte County - east
- Starke County - southeast
- Jasper County - south
- Lake County - west
- Cook County, Illinois, - northwest, boundary in Lake Michigan
- Berrien County, Michigan - northeast, boundary in Lake Michigan

=== Protected areas ===
- Indiana Dunes National Park (part)
- Indiana Dunes National Park Heron Rookery
- Indiana Dunes State Park
- Moraine Nature Preserve

=== Major highways ===
- I-80 Toll / I-90 Toll
- I-94
- US 6
- US 12
- US 20
- US 30
- US 231
- SR 2
- SR 8
- SR 49
- SR 130 – former US 30
- SR 149 – former SR 49
- SR 249 – former SR 49
- SR 520 – former US 20

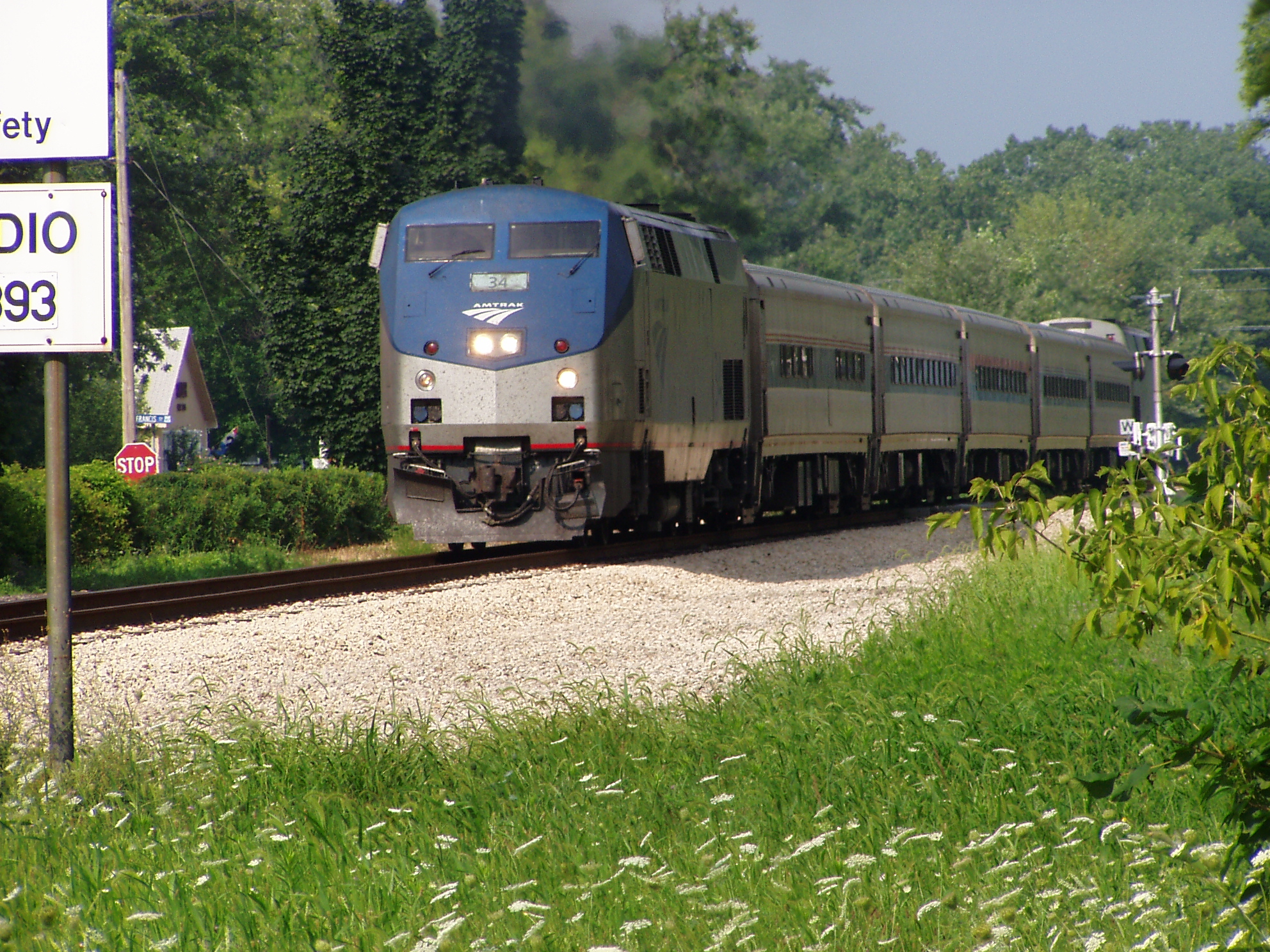
Amtrak's Wolverine passing through Porter, Indiana

=== Railroads ===
- Amtrak
- Canadian National
- Chesapeake and Indiana Railroad
- Chicago, Fort Wayne and Eastern Railroad
- Chicago South Shore and South Bend Railroad
- CSX Transportation
- Norfolk Southern Railway
- South Shore Line

== Municipalities ==
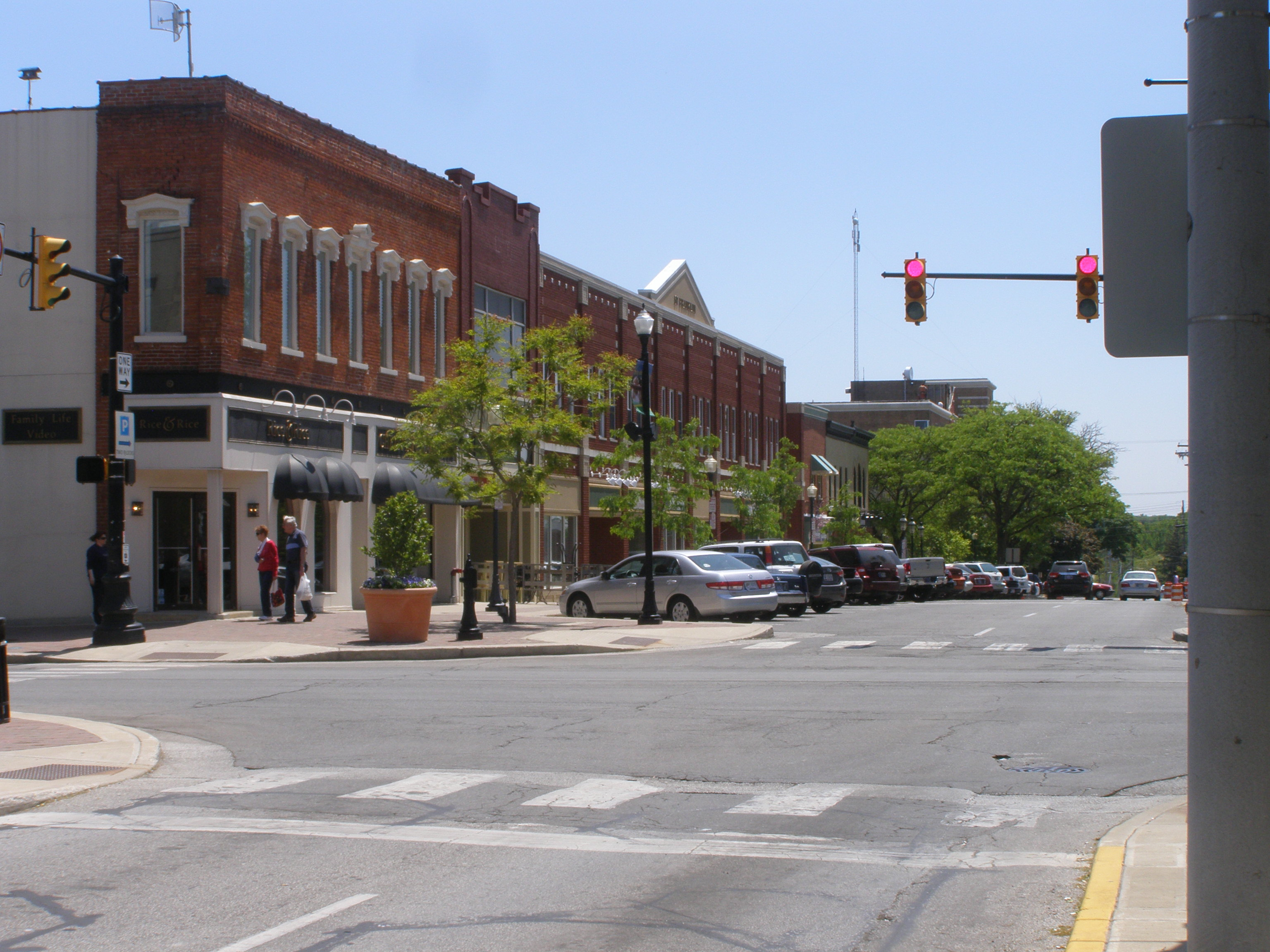
Franklin Street, east side of the Courthouse Square, Valparaiso

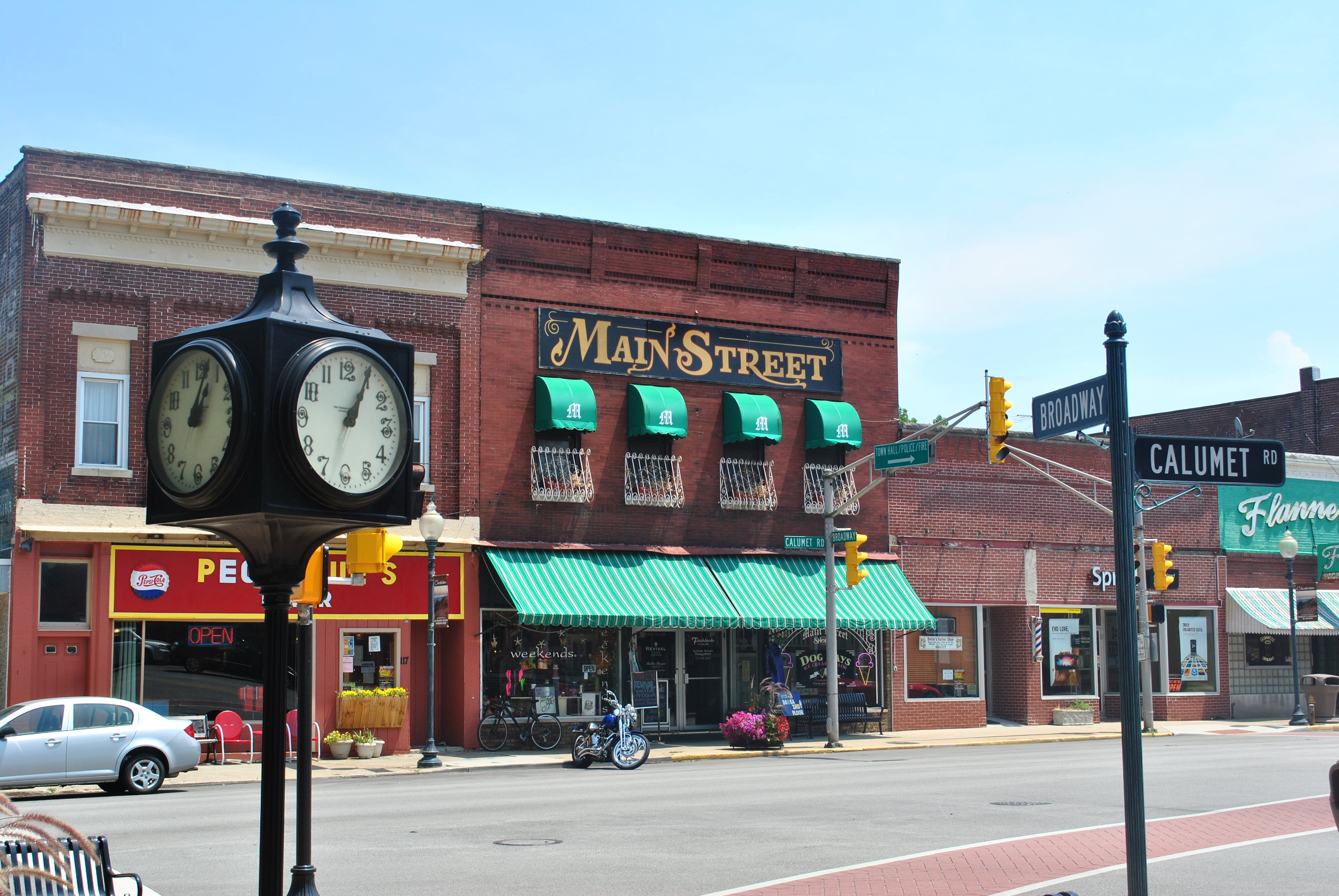
Calumet Avenue downtown Chesterton

The municipalities in Porter County and their populations as of the 2010 Census:

=== Cities ===
- Portage – 38,882
- Valparaiso – 34,937

=== Towns ===
- Beverly Shores – 604
- Burns Harbor – 2,185
- Chesterton – 14,913
- Dune Acres – 234
- Hebron – 3,725
- Kouts – 2,068
- Ogden Dunes – 1,167
- Porter – 5,205
- Town of Pines – 594

=== Census-designated places ===
- Aberdeen – 1,875
- Lakes of the Four Seasons – 3,097 (7,033 including portion in Lake County)
- Salt Creek Commons – 2,117
- Shorewood Forest – 3,030
- South Haven – 5,282
- Wheeler – 435

=== Unincorporated communities ===
- Aylesworth
- Babcock
- Beatrice
- Boone Grove
- Burdick
- Clanricarde
- Coburg
- Crocker
- Furnessville
- Hurlburt
- Malden
- Porter Crossroads
- Sedley
- Suman
- Tassinong
- Woodville

=== Townships ===
The 12 townships of Porter County:

- Boone
- Center
- Jackson
- Liberty
- Morgan
- Pine
- Pleasant
- Portage
- Porter
- Union
- Washington
- Westchester

== Education ==
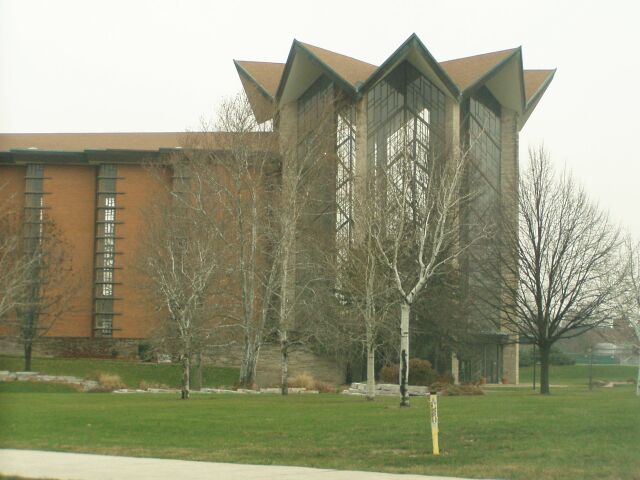
Valparaiso University Chapel

=== Colleges and universities ===
- Ivy Tech Community College
- Valparaiso University

=== Public school districts ===
Public schools in Porter County are administered by several districts, most of which cover areas that roughly follow the county's township boundaries:

- Metropolitan School District of Boone Township – Boone Township
- Duneland School Corporation – Jackson, Liberty and Westchester townships
- East Porter County School Corporation – Morgan, Pleasant and Washington townships
- Michigan City Area Schools – Pine Township
- Portage Township Schools – Portage Township
- Porter Township School Corporation – Porter Township
- Union Township School Corporation – Union Township
- Valparaiso Community Schools – Center Township

High schools and middle schools

- Benjamin Franklin Middle School
- Boone Grove High School
- Boone Grove Middle School
- Chesterton High School
- Hebron High School
- Hebron Middle School
- Kouts Middle-High School
- Liberty Intermediate/Middle School
- Morgan Township Middle/High School
- Portage High School
- Thomas Jefferson Middle School
- Union Township Middle School
- Valparaiso High School
- Washington Township Middle/High School
- Wheeler High School
- Westchester Intermediate/Middle School
- William Fegely Middle School
- Willowcreek Middle School

Elementary schools

- Aylesworth Elementary School
- Bailly Elementary School
- Boone Grove Elementary School
- Brummitt Elementary School
- Central Elementary School (Portage)
- Central Elementary School (Valparaiso)
- Cooks Corners Elementary School
- Crisman Elementary School
- Flint Lake Elementary School
- Hayes Leonard Elementary School
- Hebron Elementary School
- Jackson Elementary School
- John Simatovich Elementary School
- Jones Elementary School
- Kouts Elementary School
- Kyle Elementary School
- Liberty Elementary School
- Liberty Intermediate School
- Memorial Elementary School
- Morgan Elementary School
- Myers Elementary School
- Northview Elementary School
- Parkview Elementary School
- Paul Saylor Elementary School
- Pine Elementary School
- Porter Lakes Elementary School
- South Haven Elementary School
- Thomas Jefferson Elementary School
- Union Center Elementary School
- Washington Township Elementary School
- Westchester Intermediate School
- Yost Elementary School

== Public libraries ==
The county is served by two public library systems:

- Porter County Public Library has its main branch in Valparaiso with branches in Hebron, Kouts, Portage and South Haven.
- Westchester Public Library has its main branch, the Thomas Library, in Chesterton with a branch, the Hageman Library, in Porter.

== Hospitals ==
- Porter Health Care System – 301 beds
  - Portage Hospital – Portage
  - Porter Regional Hospital – Valparaiso

== Climate and weather ==
Valparaiso, Indiana

Climate chart (precipitation, max. and min. temperature)
J	F	M	A	M	J	J	A	S	O	N	D
2.1 30 15	1.8 36 20	2.9 47 29	3.6 60 38	3.9 71 49	4.7 80 58	3.8 83 63	3.9 81 61	3.7 74 54	3.2 63 43	3.6 48 33	2.9 35 22
- █ Average max. and min. temperatures in °F
- █ Precipitation totals in inches
- Source: The Weather Channel
Metric conversion
J	F	M	A	M	J	J	A	S	O	N	D
54 −1 −9	46 2 −7	74 8 −2	92 16 3	98 22 9	118 27 14	97 28 17	99 27 16	93 23 12	81 17 6	90 9 1	73 2 −6
- █ Average max. and min. temperatures in °C
- █ Precipitation totals in mm

In recent years, average temperatures in Valparaiso have ranged from a low of 15 °F (−9 °C) in January to a high of 83 °F (28 °C) in July, although a record low of −25 °F (−32 °C) was recorded in January 1985 and a record high of 105 °F (41 °C) was recorded in July 1934. Average monthly precipitation ranged from 1.82 inches (46 mm) in February to 4.66 inches (118 mm) in June.

== Government ==
The county government is a constitutional body, and is granted specific powers by the Constitution of Indiana and the Indiana Code.

County Council: The legislative branch of the county government, it controls spending and revenue collection in the county. Representatives are elected to four-year terms from county districts. They set salaries, the annual budget, and special spending. The council has limited authority to impose local taxes, in the form of an income and property tax that is subject to state-level approval, excise taxes, and service taxes.

Board of Commissioners: The executive body of the county, commissioners are elected county-wide to staggered four-year terms. One commissioner serves as president. The commissioners execute acts legislated by the council, collect revenue, and manage the county government.

Court: The county maintains a small claims court that handles civil cases. The judge on the court is elected to a term of four years and must be a member of the Indiana Bar Association. The judge is assisted by a constable, who is also elected to a four-year term. In some cases, court decisions can be appealed to the state-level circuit court.

County officials: The county has other elected offices, including sheriff, coroner, auditor, treasurer, recorder, surveyor, and circuit court clerk. These officials are elected to four-year terms. Members elected to county government positions are required to declare party affiliations and to be residents of the county.

Porter County is part of Indiana's 1st congressional district. In state government, Porter County is in Indiana Senate districts 4th, 5th and 6th; in Indiana House of Representatives districts 3rd, 4th, 10th, 19th and 20th.

For most of its history, Porter County was a Republican Party stronghold in presidential elections. It has become a swing county in recent years, voting for the national winner in every presidential election since 1980 except for 1992 and 2020.

United States presidential election results for Porter County, Indiana
Year	Republican		Democratic		Third party(ies)	
Year	No.	%	No.	%	No.	%
1888	2,427	52.82%	2,018	43.92%	150	3.26%
1892	2,187	49.73%	1,937	44.04%	274	6.23%
1896	2,853	58.06%	2,026	41.23%	35	0.71%
1900	2,797	59.49%	1,848	39.30%	57	1.21%
1904	3,162	66.39%	1,437	30.17%	164	3.44%
1908	2,940	59.88%	1,789	36.44%	181	3.69%
1912	1,510	35.28%	1,352	31.59%	1,418	33.13%
1916	2,913	59.22%	1,871	38.04%	135	2.74%
1920	5,570	72.68%	1,671	21.80%	423	5.52%
1924	5,613	67.76%	1,640	19.80%	1,031	12.45%
1928	7,107	70.44%	2,921	28.95%	62	0.61%
1932	5,631	49.47%	5,542	48.69%	209	1.84%
1936	6,278	52.60%	5,560	46.58%	98	0.82%
1940	8,270	58.40%	5,840	41.24%	51	0.36%
1944	8,561	60.52%	5,528	39.08%	57	0.40%
1948	8,907	62.21%	5,161	36.05%	250	1.75%
1952	13,194	68.75%	5,909	30.79%	87	0.45%
1956	14,970	72.71%	5,574	27.07%	45	0.22%
1960	15,666	59.18%	10,733	40.54%	75	0.28%
1964	14,480	52.45%	12,975	47.00%	152	0.55%
1968	17,328	53.18%	8,914	27.36%	6,340	19.46%
1972	26,877	74.60%	8,943	24.82%	210	0.58%
1976	25,489	59.75%	16,468	38.60%	701	1.64%
1980	30,055	64.20%	12,869	27.49%	3,892	8.31%
1984	32,505	64.14%	17,862	35.24%	315	0.62%
1988	29,790	60.37%	19,390	39.29%	165	0.33%
1992	22,644	39.68%	21,022	36.84%	13,401	23.48%
1996	22,931	42.00%	24,044	44.04%	7,621	13.96%
2000	31,157	52.47%	26,790	45.12%	1,431	2.41%
2004	34,794	53.63%	29,388	45.30%	691	1.07%
2008	33,857	45.60%	39,178	52.77%	1,211	1.63%
2012	34,406	46.94%	37,252	50.82%	1,645	2.24%
2016	38,832	49.62%	33,676	43.03%	5,745	7.34%
2020	45,008	51.87%	39,746	45.81%	2,014	2.32%
2024	46,109	53.99%	37,213	43.58%	2,077	2.43%

=== County elected officials ===
Board of commissioners:
- Jim Biggs (R, North District)
- Barb Regnitz (R, Center District)
- Ed Morales (R, South District)

County council:

- Ronald "Red" Stone, Vice President (R, 1st)
- Jeremy Rivas (D, 2nd)
- Greg Simms (D, 3rd)
- Andy Vasquez, President (|R, 4th)
- Michelle Harris (R, at-large)
- Andy Bozak (R, at-large)
- Mike Brickner (R, at-large)

Elected officials:

- Assessor: Sue Neff (R)
- Auditor: Karen Martin (R)
- Clerk: Jessica A. Bailey (D)
- Coroner: Cyndi Dykes (R)
- Prosecutor: Gary S. Germann (D)
- Recorder: Chuck Harris (R)
- Sheriff: Jeffery A. Balon (R)
- Surveyor: Kevin D. Breitzke (D)
- Treasurer: Jimmy Albarran (R)

== Demographics ==
Historical population
Census	Pop.	Note	%±
1840	2,162		—
1850	5,234		142.1%
1860	10,313		97.0%
1870	13,942		35.2%
1880	17,227		23.6%
1890	18,052		4.8%
1900	19,175		6.2%
1910	20,540		7.1%
1920	20,256		−1.4%
1930	22,821		12.7%
1940	27,836		22.0%
1950	40,076		44.0%
1960	60,279		50.4%
1970	87,114		44.5%
1980	119,816		37.5%
1990	128,932		7.6%
2000	146,798		13.9%
2010	164,343		12.0%
2020	173,215		5.4%
2025 (est.)	176,049	▲	1.6%
US Decennial Census; 1790-1960 1900-1990; 1990-2000 2010-2019

=== Racial and ethnic composition ===
Porter County, Indiana – Racial and ethnic composition Note: the US Census treats Hispanic/Latino as an ethnic category. This table excludes Latinos from the racial categories and assigns them to a separate category. Hispanics/Latinos may be of any race.
Race / Ethnicity (NH = Non-Hispanic)	Pop 1980	Pop 1990	Pop 2000	Pop 2010	Pop 2020	% 1980	% 1990	% 2000	% 2010	% 2020
White alone (NH)	115,949	123,444	135,334	141,243	136,993	96.77%	95.74%	92.19%	85.94%	79.09%
Black or African American alone (NH)	288	446	1,314	4,649	7,246	0.24%	0.35%	0.90%	2.83%	4.18%
Native American or Alaska Native alone (NH)	164	229	269	349	259	0.14%	0.18%	0.18%	0.21%	0.15%
Asian alone (NH)	551	913	1,327	1,960	2,197	0.46%	0.71%	0.90%	1.19%	1.27%
Native Hawaiian or Pacific Islander alone (NH)	x	x	37	31	51	x	x	0.03%	0.02%	0.03%
Other race alone (NH)	175	42	88	170	602	0.15%	0.03%	0.06%	0.10%	0.35%
Mixed race or Multiracial (NH)	x	x	1,350	2,008	6,963	x	x	0.92%	1.22%	4.02%
Hispanic or Latino (any race)	2,689	3,858	7,079	13,933	18,904	2.24%	2.99%	4.82%	8.48%	10.91%
Total	119,816	128,932	146,798	164,343	173,215	100.00%	100.00%	100.00%	100.00%	100.00%

=== 2020 census ===
As of the 2020 census, the county had a population of 173,215. The median age was 40.6 years; 22.1% of the residents were under 18 and 17.6% were 65 or older. The female/male ratio was 1:0.967 overall and 1:0.945 for those 18 and over.

The racial makeup of the county was 82.6% White, 4.4% Black or African American, 0.3% American Indian and Alaska Native, 1.3% Asian, <0.1% Native Hawaiian and Pacific Islander, 2.9% from some other race, and 8.5% from two or more races. Hispanic or Latino residents of any race comprised 10.9% of the population.

About 76.4% of residents lived in urban areas, while 23.6% lived in rural areas.

Of the 67,361 households in the county, 30.6% had children under 18 living in them, 52.2% were married-couple households, 17.2% were households with a male householder and no spouse or partner present, and 23.5% were households with a female householder and no spouse or partner present. About 25.3% of all households were made up of individuals, and 10.5% had someone living alone who was 65 or older.

The county had 71,483 housing units, of which 5.8% were vacant. Among occupied housing units, 75.9% were owner-occupied and 24.1% were renter-occupied. The homeowner vacancy rate was 1.2% and the rental vacancy rate was 7.2%.

=== 2010 Census ===
As of the 2010 United States census, 164,343 people, 61,998 households, and 43,901 families lived in the county. The population density was 393.0 inhabitants per square mile (151.7/km^{2}). The 66,179 housing units had an average density of 158.3 per square mile (61.1/km^{2}). The racial makeup of the county was 91.3% White, 3.0% Black or African American, 1.2% Asian, 0.3% American Indian, 2.3% from other races, and 1.9% from two or more races. Those of Hispanic or Latino origin made up 8.5% of the population. In terms of ancestry, 29.1% were German, 18.5% were Irish, 10.1% were Polish, 9.7% were English, 5.8% were Italian, and 5.6% were American.

Of the 61,998 households, 34.1% had children under 18 living with them, 55.7% were married couples living together, 10.4% had a female householder with no husband present, 29.2% were not families; 23.3% of all households were made up of individuals. The average household size was 2.60, and the average family size was 3.07. The median age was 38.4 years.

The median income in the county for a household was $47,697and for a family was $73,065. Males had a median income of $59,542 versus $35,534 for females. The per capita income for the county was $27,922. About 6.6% of families and 9.4% of the population were below the poverty line, including 12.8% of those under 18 and 5.2% of those 65 or over.

Places by population and race
Place	Population (2010)	White	Black or African American	Asian	Other (Note: Other = Combined percentages for American Indian or Alaska Native; Native Hawaiian or Pacific Islander; other races; and two or more races)	Hispanic or Latino (of any race)
Porter County	164,343	91.3%	3.0%	1.2%	4.5%	8.5%
Aberdeen, CDP	1,875	91.1%	3.3%	2.6%	3.0%	5.4%
Beverly Shores, town	613	96.6%	1.3%	0.3%	1.8%	2.8%
Burns Harbor, town	1,156	95.4%	1.8%	0.3%	2.5%	5.8%
Chesterton, town	13,068	92.7%	1.4%	2.1%	3.8%	6.9%
Dune Acres, town	182	95.1%	1.1%	2.2%	1.6%	1.6%
Hebron, town	3,724	95.9%	1.1%	0.4%	2.6%	6.1%
Kouts, town	1,879	97.6%	0.3%	0.6%	1.5%	5.1%
Lakes of the Four Seasons, CDP (Note: Population is 3,097 within Porter County; 3,936 reside in Lake County)	7,033	93.4%	1.2%	1.0%	4.4%	8.5%
Ogden Dunes, town	1,110	96.1%	1.1%	1.3%	1.5%	3.2%
Portage, city	36,828	83.6%	7.3%	0.9%	8.2%	16.4%
Porter, town	4,858	94.3%	1.1%	0.9%	3.7%	6.6%
Salt Creek Commons, CDP	2,117	94.2%	1.0%	1.6%	3.2%	8.3%
Shorewood Forest, CDP	2,708	89.4%	3.8%	4.0%	2.8%	3.7%
South Haven, CDP	5,282	91.3%	3.0%	0.3%	5.4%	9.8%
Town of Pines, town	708	93.9%	2.3%	0.3%	3.5%	3.1%
Valparaiso, city	31,730	89.9%	3.3%	2.1%	4.7%	7.1%
Wheeler, CDP	443	94.1%	0.9%	0.2%	4.8%	4.5%

Places by population and standard of living
Place	Population (2010)	Per capita income	Median household income	Median home value
Porter County	164,343	$28,244	$62,457	$166,600
Aberdeen, CDP	1,875	$46,604	$100,278	$303,200
Beverly Shores, town	613	$68,750	$39,906	$429,200
Burns Harbor, town	1,156	$26,337	$62,500	$149,700
Chesterton, town	13,068	$29,147	$64,183	$174,500
Dune Acres, town	182	$141,256	$161,875	$677,600
Hebron, town	3,724	$54,276	$23,027	$135,900
Kouts, town	1,879	$22,907	$61,087	$143,100
Lakes of the Four Seasons, CDP	7,033	$32,908	$84,242	$182,600
Ogden Dunes, town	1,110	$59,561	$106,406	$343,800
Portage, city	36,828	$23,892	$51,623	$137,700
Porter, town	4,858	$66,304	$32,210	$167,100
Salt Creek Commons, CDP	2,117	$18,778	$60,478	$114,800
Shorewood Forest, CDP	2,708	$49,743	$118,984	$327,400
South Haven, CDP	5,282	$19,355	$49,746	$110,800
Town of Pines, town	708	$20,255	$36,111	$96,600
Valparaiso, city	31,730	$24,894	$50,182	$165,200
Wheeler, CDP	443	$22,481	$58,229	$134,900

== Cemeteries ==
Maplewood Cemetery, next to Graceland in Valparaiso, has burials from the 1700s. The Bailly Cemetery was started in 1827. Additional cemeteries were created as the population grew. Early cemeteries were often family owned or church related. As communities grew, community cemeteries developed. The newest cemetery in the county is Angel Crest Cemetery north of Valparaiso, near Indiana State Road 49.

== Parks ==
Porter County has grown from a single park, Sunset Hill Farm County Park, to four, including: Calumet Trail, Dunn's Bridge County Park, and the newest, Brincka Cross Gardens.

- Brincka Cross Gardens Pine Township (4 acres (1.6 ha))
- Calumet Trail (9.1 miles (14.6 km) long), parallel to U.S. 12, at the north end of the county. A mixed use trail for walking, running, biking and cross-country skiing.
- Dunn's Bridge County Park on the southern boundary of the county on County Road 500 East, Dunn's Bridge spans the Kankakee River to Jasper county. It is one of the oldest landmarks in the region. Built over a century ago across the Kankakee River by a resident farmer named Dunn, legend suggests its origins may be traced to the famous George Ferris, creator of the first 'Ferris Wheel'. The park provides small boat access to the Kankakee River and a parking lot.
- Sunset Hill Farm County Park (238 acres (96 ha)). Built around the Col. Murray farm, the open meadows are used for festivals and events.

== Cultural activities ==
=== Museums ===
- Alton Goin Museum is operated by the Portage Community Historical Society at Countryside Park in Portage to preserve the city's history, including the Trager farmhouse.
- Bailly Homestead & Chellberg Farm is part of Indiana Dunes National Park.
- Brauer Museum of Art is operated by Valparaiso University and is located in Valparaiso University Center for the Arts. It has the largest collection of works by Junius R. Sloan.
- Depot of Beverly Shores Museum & Art Gallery is a pink stucco museum to preserve Beverly Shores history through rotating exhibits of paintings, drawings, sculpture, ceramics and woodcarving.
- Hour Glass House Museum has the works of local artists.
- Porter County Museum of History maintains the history of Porter County.
- Stagecoach Inn & Panhandle Depot is operated by the Hebron Historical Society in Hebron.
- Westchester Township History Museum is operated by the Westchester Public Library and is located in the George Brown Mansion, the former home of a wealthy family that exhibits local history of the Indiana Dunes.
- Task Force Tips Fire Museum is operated by Task Force Tips in Valparaiso to preserve the history of fire equipment.

=== Live Theater ===
- 4th Street Theater is a community theater in Chesterton.
- Chicago Street Theatre is a community theater in Valparaiso.
- Front Porch Music is a music supply store that offers a weekly 'open mic' night and sponsors concerts in Valparaiso.
- Memorial Opera House presents live theater and a variety of other monthly programs.
- Valparaiso Theatrical Company travels to different venues in Porter County presenting live theater with the proceeds benefitting a variety of charities.
- Valparaiso University Center for the Arts is the Valparaiso University's performing arts center.

== See also ==
- National Register of Historic Places listings in Porter County, Indiana

== Bibliography ==
- Cutler, Harry G. (1912), History of Porter County, Indiana: A Narrative Account of Its Historical Progress, Its People and Its Principal Interests, Volume 1, Chicago, Illinois: Lewis Publishing Company
- Eggleston, Larry G. (2004), Porter County Lakes and Resorts, Arcadia Publishing
- Shults-Gay, Deborah H. (1917), One of the Earliest Authentic Histories of Porter County, Indiana from 1832 to 1876, s.l.: s.n.
