= Coburg, Indiana =

- Unincorporated town
- Location within Indiana Location within the United States
- Coordinates: 41°31′08″N 86°56′58″W
- Country: United States
- State: Indiana
- County: Porter
- Township: Washington
- Elevation: 774 ft (236 m)
- Time zone: UTC-6 (Central (CST))
  - Summer (DST): UTC-5 (CDT)
- ZIP code: 46383
- Area code: 219
- GNIS feature ID: 449641

Coburg was an unincorporated town in Washington Township, Porter County, in the U.S. state of Indiana. The name has also been spelled Coburgh.

== Geography ==
Coburg was located near the junction of Indiana State Road 2 and the Baltimore and Ohio Railroad. It was located in sections 1 and 2 of Washington Township, in the northernmost part of that township.

== History ==
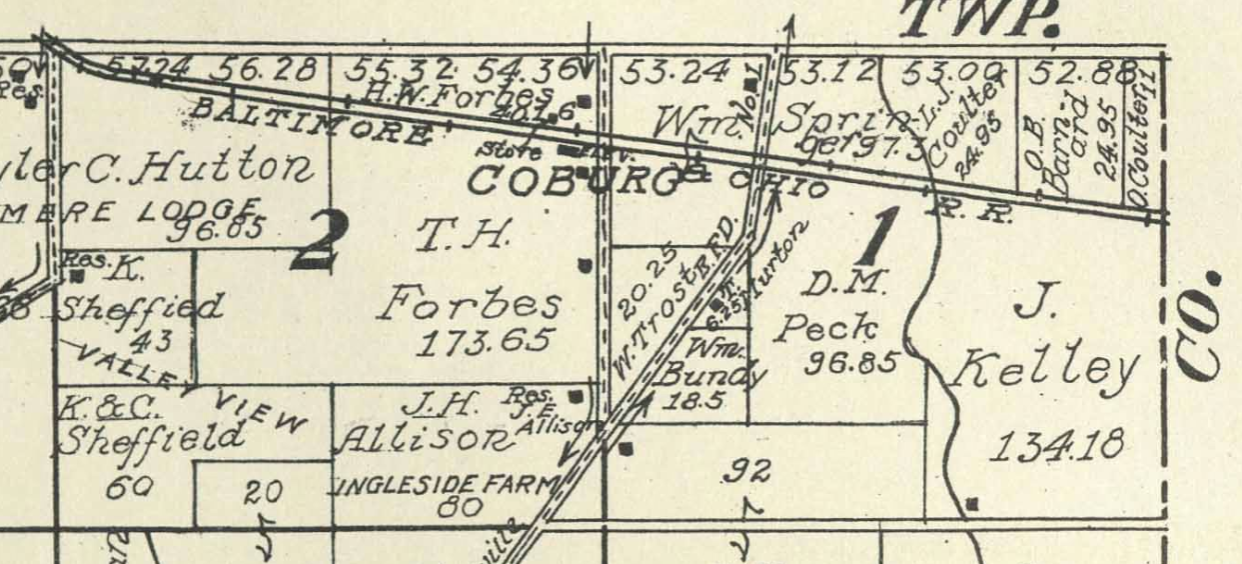
Coburg was in northern Washington Township

Settlers were present as early as 1834. The community was named after Cobourg, Ontario, the native home of an early settler, Jacob T Forbes.

Coburg was a station and shipping point on the Baltimore and Ohio Railroad. According to a 1912 history of the county, when the rail line was established in the 1870s, many residents moved from Steamburg to Coburg, and Steamburg ceased to exist. The B&O Railroad built a line through the area in 1873, and local resident Jacob Forbes who owned the surrounding land got to name the station. Structures from the nearby community of Steamburg were dismantled and moved. A post office was established at Coburg in 1876.

Coburg's population was 50 in 1890, and was 43 in 1900. The post office was discontinued in 1906.

Coburg's population was 15 in 1940.

According to a 1958 news report, by that point Coburg consisted of only the ruins of Jacob Forbes' home and a weather-beaten Grange hall. A store and storekeeper's residence no longer existed. The former Coburg school had become a residence.

== See also ==
- Suman, Indiana
