= Shorewood =

Shorewood is a place name used in the United States:

- Shorewood, Illinois, a village located in Will County
- Shorewood-Tower Hills-Harbert, Michigan, a census-designated place
- Shorewood, Minnesota, a city located in Hennepin County
- Shorewood, Wisconsin, a village located in Milwaukee County

== See also ==
- Shorewood Forest, Indiana, a census-designated place
