= Crocker =

Crocker is an archaic synonym of potter.

== People and fictional characters ==
- Crocker (surname)

== Places ==
=== United States ===
- Crocker, Indiana, an unincorporated community
- Crocker, Iowa, an unincorporated community
- Crocker, Missouri, a city
- Crocker, South Dakota, a census-designated place
- Crocker, Washington, a census designated place
- Mount Crocker, California
- Crocker Mountain (Maine)

=== Elsewhere ===
- Mount Crocker, east of Comet, Queensland, Australia
- Crocker Mountains, Sabah, Malaysia

== Business ==
- Crocker & Brewster, an American publisher based in Boston (1818–76)
- Crocker Motorcycles, an American motorcycle manufacturer
- Crocker National Bank, an American bank bought by Wells Fargo

== Other uses ==
- Crocker (sport), combination of soccer football and cricket
- Crocker Art Museum, Sacramento, California

== See also ==
- Betty Crocker, a brand name owned by General Mills
- Lee Daniel Crocker, a programmer best known for rewriting Wikipedia's software
