= Porter Township School Corporation =

School district in Indiana

Address
- 248 South 500 West Valparaiso, Porter County, Indiana, 46385; United States

District information
- Type: Public
- Grades: K–12
- Established: 1913; 113 years ago
- Superintendent: Stacey Schmidt

Students and staff
- Enrollment: 1404 (2017–2018)
- Faculty: 100.50 (on an FTE basis)
- District mascot: Wolves
- Colors

Other information
- Website: www.ptsc.k12.in.us

The Porter Township School Corporation is the school system that serves students in kindergarten through twelfth grade from Porter Township in Porter County, Indiana, United States. Porter Township is primarily a rural area.

At the start of the 2013–2014 school year, Boone Grove High School entered the first year of its 1:1 program which gives each student their own device to perform school work on. While it started off with some issues, the program was ultimately a great success and led the other schools to become 1:1 as well. Currently, all grade levels in the district are fully 1:1 with each student having their own device.

== Schools ==
- Porter Lake Elementary School (K–3)
  - Kristin Mucha, Principal
- Boone Grove Elementary School (4–5)
  - Edward Ivanyo, Principal
- Boone Grove Middle School (6–8)
  - Jessica Wotherspoon, Principal
- Boone Grove High School (9–12)
  - Clay Corman, Principal
