= Sedley, Indiana =

- Unincorporated community
- Location within Indiana Location within the United States
- Coordinates: 41°29′19″N 87°09′27″W
- Country: United States
- State: Indiana
- County: Porter
- Township: Union
- Elevation: 689 ft (210 m)
- Time zone: UTC-6 (Central (CST))
  - Summer (DST): UTC-5 (CDT)
- ZIP code: 46385
- Area code: 219
- GNIS feature ID: 443195

Sedley is an unincorporated community in Union Township, Porter County, in the U.S. state of Indiana.

== History ==
A post office was established at Sedley in 1883, and remained in operation until 1910. The community was a station on the Grand Trunk Railroad.
