= Burdick, Indiana =

- Unincorporated town
- Location within Indiana Location within the United States
- Coordinates: 41°36′04″N 86°58′22″W
- Country: United States
- State: Indiana
- County: Porter
- Township: Jackson
- Elevation: 686 ft (209 m)
- Time zone: UTC-6 (Central (CST))
  - Summer (DST): UTC-5 (CDT)
- ZIP code: 46304
- Area code: 219
- GNIS feature ID: 431827

Burdick is an unincorporated town in Jackson Township, Porter County, in the U.S. state of Indiana.

== History ==
A post office was established at Burdick in 1871, and remained in operation until it was discontinued in 1933. The community was named for A. C. Burdick, a businessperson in the lumber industry.
