= Indiana State Road 8 =

State highway in Indiana, United States

State Road 8
- SR 8 highlighted in red

Route information
- Maintained by INDOT
- Length: 77.476 mi (124.686 km)
- Existed: 1932–present

Western segment
- Length: 42.845 mi (68.952 km)
- West end: US 231 / SR 2 in Hebron
- Major intersections: US 421 in LaCrosse; US 35 in Knox
- East end: SR 17 near Plymouth

Eastern segment
- Length: 34.631 mi (55.733 km)
- West end: SR 9 in Albion
- Major intersections: SR 3 in Avilla; I-69 in Auburn; SR 1 near Saint Joe
- East end: SR 18 near Hicksville, OH

Location
- Country: United States
- State: Indiana
- Counties: Lake, Porter, LaPorte, Starke, Marshall, Noble, DeKalb

Highway system
- Indiana State Highway System; Interstate; US; State; Scenic
← SR 7	→ SR 9

State Road 8 in the U.S. state of Indiana consists of two disconnected segmented highways.

== Route description ==
No part of SR 8 in Indiana is included as a part of the National Highway System (NHS). The NHS is a network of highways that are identified as being most important for the economy, mobility and defense of the nation.

=== Western segment ===
The western terminus of the western segment is at U.S. Route 231(US 231) and SR 2 in Hebron. The highway goes due east leaving Hebron and heading toward Knox. It passes through rural farmland, having a four-way stop at SR 49 in Kouts. The route enters La Crosse having a four-way stop at US 421. North of Knox it begins a concurrency with US 35; this ends in downtown Knox with SR 8 heading due east. The road leaves Knox passing through the east side of town. The eastern terminus of the western segment is at SR 17.

=== Eastern segment ===
The western terminus of the eastern segment begins at SR 9. The road heads east from Albion toward SR 3. On the way to SR 3 the highway passes through rural farmland. The road begins a concurrency with SR 3 at a traffics light north of Avilla; this ends at an intersection with SR 3 on the east side of Avilla. The road then goes due east towards Auburn. It has a four-way stop at SR 327 north of Garrett. The route enters Auburn on the west side of town and has an interchange with Interstate 69(I-69). The road now passes through commercial areas before entering downtown Auburn where it has an intersection with Old SR 427. The roadway now leaves Auburn, returning to rural farmland. The highway has a short concurrency with SR 1. The route turns southeast towards Hicksville, OH. SR 8 ends at the Ohio state line; which then continues into the western terminus of Ohio State Route 18.

== History ==
=== Western section ===
In the early 1940s, the road's western terminus was at the Illinois state line, becoming Exchange Street. It was truncated eastward to US 41 in St. John in the 1970s. From St. John to Hebron, it was concurrent to US 231. SR 8 was later truncated to its junction with US 231 in Hebron, eliminating the concurrency.

=== Central section ===
In 1951, SR 8 started in Lake Wawasee at SR 13 and continued east to US 33 south of Kimmell. This section was deleted in 1971.

== Major intersections ==
County	Location	mi	km	Destinations	Notes
Porter	Hebron	0.000	0.000	US 231 (Main Street) / SR 2	Western end of SR 8
Porter	Kouts	9.059	14.579	SR 49 (Main Street)	
LaPorte	LaCrosse	16.053	25.835	US 421 (Washington Street)	
Starke	Jackson Township	24.060	38.721	SR 39 – North Judson, La Porte	Kankakee Fish and Wildlife Area
Starke	Center Township	30.131	48.491	US 35 north – Michigan City	northern end of US 35 concurrency
Starke	Knox	32.134	51.715	US 35 south (Heaton Street) – Winamac	Southern end of US 35 concurrency
Starke	Washington Township	37.144	59.777	SR 23 – Ober	
Marshall	West Township	42.845	68.952	SR 17	Eastern end of the western segment of SR 8
Gap in route
Noble	Albion	42.921	69.075	SR 9 (Orange Street)	Western end of the eastern segment of SR 8
Noble	Allen Township	52.112	83.866	SR 3 north – Kendallville	Western end of SR 3 concurrency
Noble	Avilla	54.833	88.245	SR 3 south – Fort Wayne	Eastern end of SR 3 concurrency
DeKalb	Garrett	59.264	95.376	SR 327 – Garrett, Corunna	
DeKalb	Auburn	57.249– 57.381	92.133– 92.346	I-69 – Fort Wayne, Lansing	Interchange
DeKalb	Concord Township	72.436	116.574	SR 1 south – St. Joe	Western end of SR 1 concurrency
DeKalb	Concord Township	73.379	118.092	SR 1 north / SR 101 south – Butler, Woodburn	Eastern end of SR 1 concurrency; northern terminus of SR 101
DeKalb	Newville Township	77.552	124.808	SR 18 – Hicksville	Ohio state line
1.000 mi = 1.609 km; 1.000 km = 0.621 mi: Concurrency terminus
