= Hurlburt, Indiana =

- Unincorporated community
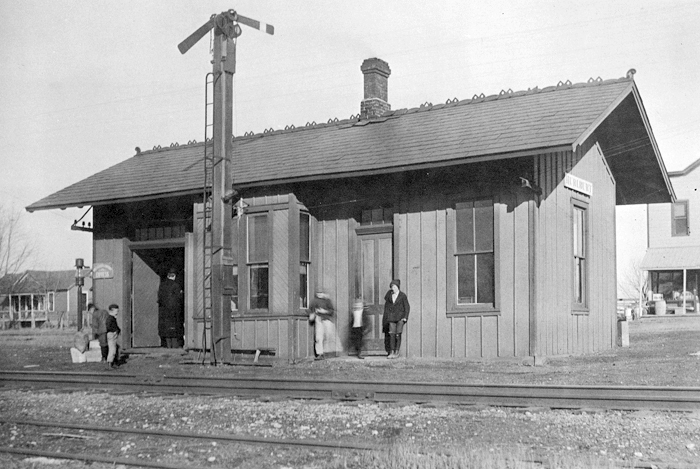
- Railway station in Hurlburt (1910)

- Location within Indiana Location within the United States
- Coordinates: 41°22′12″N 87°10′36″W
- Country: United States
- State: Indiana
- County: Porter
- Township: Porter
- Elevation: 722 ft (220 m)
- Time zone: UTC-6 (Central (CST))
  - Summer (DST): UTC-5 (CDT)
- ZIP code: 46341
- Area code: 219
- GNIS feature ID: 436641

Hurlburt is an unincorporated community in Porter Township, Porter County, in the U.S. state of Indiana.

== History ==
A post office was established at Hurlburt in 1883, and remained in operation until 1918. The community was named for a pioneer settler.
