= Lakes of the Four Seasons, Indiana =

- Census-designated place
- Location in Lake County and Porter County, Indiana
- Coordinates: 41°24′27″N 87°13′13″W
- Country: United States
- State: Indiana
- Counties: Lake, Porter
- Townships: Winfield, Porter

Area
  - Total: 2.69 sq mi (6.98 km^{2})
  - Land: 2.28 sq mi (5.90 km^{2})
  - Water: 0.42 sq mi (1.08 km^{2})
- Elevation: 728 ft (222 m)

Population (2020)
  - Total: 7,091
  - Density: 3,113.3/sq mi (1,202.04/km^{2})
- Time zone: UTC-6 (Central (CST))
  - Summer (DST): UTC-5 (CDT)
- ZIP code: 46307
- Area code: 219
- FIPS code: 18-41530
- GNIS feature ID: 2393090
- Website: www.lofs.org

Lakes of the Four Seasons is a census-designated place (CDP) in Lake and Porter counties in the U.S. state of Indiana. As of the 2020 census, Lakes of the Four Seasons had a population of 7,091.

== Geography ==
The county line of Porter and Lake counties runs directly through the center of the Four Seasons. While the entire community, both the Porter and Lake County sides, have Crown Point mailing addresses, the school districts attended by the children who reside within the community are separated by county. Residents on the Porter County side are considered part of the Porter Township school system, whereas those on the Lake County side are in the Crown Point school system.

According to the United States Census Bureau, the CDP has a total area of 2.7 square miles (7.0 km^{2}), of which 2.3 square miles (5.9 km^{2}) are land and 0.42 square miles (1.1 km^{2}), or 15.39%, are water. The Lakes of the Four Seasons consist of Lake Holiday, an impoundment on the East Branch of Stony Run, plus Big Bass Lake, Lake on the Green, and Trouthaven Lake. Big Bass Lake connects to Lake Holiday, which via Stony Run drains south and west to the Kankakee River, part of the Illinois River watershed. Lake on the Green has no surface outlet, while Trouthaven Lake drains northwest to the Deep River, which winds north to the Little Calumet River and Lake Michigan.

== Demographics ==
Historical population
Census	Pop.	Note	%±
1990	6,556		—
2000	7,291		11.2%
2010	7,033		−3.5%
2020	7,091		0.8%
Source: US Census Bureau

=== Racial and ethnic composition ===
Lakes of the Four Seasons CDP, Indiana – Racial and ethnic composition Note: the US Census treats Hispanic/Latino as an ethnic category. This table excludes Latinos from the racial categories and assigns them to a separate category. Hispanics/Latinos may be of any race.
Race / Ethnicity (NH = Non-Hispanic)	Pop 2000	Pop 2010	Pop 2020	% 2000	% 2010	% 2020
White alone (NH)	6,860	6,205	5,790	94.09%	88.23%	81.65%
Black or African American alone (NH)	8	84	127	0.11%	1.19%	1.79%
Native American or Alaska Native alone (NH)	12	8	6	0.16%	0.11%	0.08%
Asian alone (NH)	56	67	53	0.77%	0.95%	0.75%
Native Hawaiian or Pacific Islander alone (NH)	1	4	0	0.01%	0.06%	0.00%
Other race alone (NH)	1	5	25	0.01%	0.07%	0.35%
Mixed race or Multiracial (NH)	69	62	309	0.95%	0.88%	4.36%
Hispanic or Latino (any race)	284	598	781	3.90%	8.50%	11.01%
Total	7,291	7,033	7,091	100.00%	100.00%	100.00%

=== 2020 census ===
As of the 2020 census, Lakes of the Four Seasons had a population of 7,091. The median age was 42.6 years. 22.7% of residents were under the age of 18 and 19.2% of residents were 65 years of age or older. For every 100 females there were 98.2 males, and for every 100 females age 18 and over there were 97.3 males age 18 and over.

100.0% of residents lived in urban areas, while 0.0% lived in rural areas.

There were 2,589 households in Lakes of the Four Seasons, of which 32.0% had children under the age of 18 living in them. Of all households, 65.2% were married-couple households, 12.4% were households with a male householder and no spouse or partner present, and 17.0% were households with a female householder and no spouse or partner present. About 17.0% of all households were made up of individuals and 9.6% had someone living alone who was 65 years of age or older.

There were 2,741 housing units, of which 5.5% were vacant. The homeowner vacancy rate was 1.7% and the rental vacancy rate was 11.6%.

=== 2000 census ===
As of the census of 2000, there were 7,291 people, 2,506 households, and 2,155 families residing in the CDP. The population density was 2,720.3 inhabitants per square mile (1,050.3/km^{2}). There were 2,590 housing units at an average density of 966.3 per square mile (373.1/km^{2}). The racial makeup of the CDP was 97.06% White, 0.12% African American, 0.21% Native American, 0.77% Asian, 0.01% Pacific Islander, 0.64% from other races, and 1.18% from two or more races. Hispanic or Latino of any race were 3.90% of the population.

There were 2,506 households, out of which 41.6% had children under the age of 18 living with them, 76.5% were married couples living together, 6.6% had a female householder with no husband present, and 14.0% were non-families. 11.9% of all households were made up of individuals, and 4.7% had someone living alone who was 65 years of age or older. The average household size was 2.91 and the average family size was 3.16.

In the CDP, the population was spread out, with 28.0% under the age of 18, 6.9% from 18 to 24, 27.0% from 25 to 44, 27.7% from 45 to 64, and 10.4% who were 65 years of age or older. The median age was 39 years. For every 100 females, there were 97.6 males. For every 100 females age 18 and over, there were 95.2 males.

The median income for a household in the CDP was $67,528, and the median income for a family was $68,903. Males had a median income of $52,222 versus $28,964 for females. The per capita income for the CDP was $25,537. About 2.5% of families and 2.6% of the population were below the poverty line, including 5.3% of those under age 18 and 3.3% of those age 65 or over.
