= Suman, Indiana =

- Unincorporated community
- Location within Indiana Location within the United States
- Coordinates: 41°32′36″N 86°59′58″W
- Country: United States
- State: Indiana
- County: Porter
- Township: Jackson
- Elevation: 742 ft (226 m)
- Time zone: UTC-6 (Central (CST))
  - Summer (DST): UTC-5 (CDT)
- ZIP code: 46383
- Area code: 219
- GNIS feature ID: 444384

Suman was unincorporated community in Jackson Township, Porter County, in the U.S. state of Indiana. Old Suman Road is in the area.

== History ==
An older variant name of the village was Sumanville. It was originally laid out in 1873 by Isaac C. B. Suman (1831–1911), who had served during the Civil War as Colonel and commander of the 9th Indiana Infantry Regiment. A post office was established and operated until 1894. A justice of the peace sat at Sumanville. A nation-wide medical register and directory from 1886 reported the town's population as two-hundred.

Suman was near the Baltimore and Ohio Railroad line that ran through the area (which is now part of CSX Transportation Garrett Subdivision). A derailment took place outside of Suman station in 1923.

== See also ==
- Ville
- Lost communities of Porter County, Indiana
