= Porter Crossroads, Indiana =

- Unincorporated community
- Location within Indiana Location within the United States
- Coordinates: 41°23′57″N 87°09′42″W
- Country: United States
- State: Indiana
- County: Porter
- Township: Porter
- Elevation: 758 ft (231 m)
- Time zone: UTC-6 (Central (CST))
  - Summer (DST): UTC-5 (CDT)
- ZIP code: 46385
- Area code: 219
- GNIS feature ID: 441465

Porter Crossroads is an unincorporated community in Porter Township, Porter County, in the U.S. state of Indiana.

== History ==
A post office was established at Porter Crossroads in 1844, and remained in operation until 1873. Porter was the name of an early postmaster.
