= Salt Creek Commons, Indiana =

- Census-designated place
- Location of Salt Creek Commons in Porter County, Indiana.
- Coordinates: 41°30′40″N 87°08′28″W
- Country: United States
- State: Indiana
- Counties: Porter
- Township: Union

Area
  - Total: 0.37 sq mi (0.96 km^{2})
  - Land: 0.37 sq mi (0.96 km^{2})
  - Water: 0 sq mi (0.00 km^{2})
- Elevation: 666 ft (203 m)

Population (2020)
  - Total: 1,979
  - Density: 5,316.4/sq mi (2,052.66/km^{2})
- Time zone: UTC-6 (Central (CST))
  - Summer (DST): UTC-5 (CDT)
- ZIP code: 46385
- Area code: 219
- FIPS code: 18-67608
- GNIS feature ID: 2629777

Salt Creek Commons is a census-designated place (CDP) in Union Township, Porter County, in the U.S. state of Indiana. As of the 2020 census, Salt Creek Commons had a population of 1,979.

== Geography ==
Salt Creek Commons is located 2 miles (3 km) east of Wheeler and 6 miles (10 km) northwest of Valparaiso, the county seat. The CDP encompasses a housing development to the west of Salt Creek, a north-flowing stream which runs to the Little Calumet River.

According to the United States Census Bureau, the CDP has a total area of 0.39 square miles (1.0 km^{2}), all land.

== Demographics ==
Historical population
Census	Pop.	Note	%±
2010	2,117		—
2020	1,979		−6.5%
U.S. Decennial Census

=== 2020 census ===
As of the 2020 census, Salt Creek Commons had a population of 1,979. The median age was 36.8 years. 25.9% of residents were under the age of 18 and 11.8% of residents were 65 years of age or older. For every 100 females there were 102.1 males, and for every 100 females age 18 and over there were 97.6 males age 18 and over.

100.0% of residents lived in urban areas, while 0.0% lived in rural areas.

There were 687 households in Salt Creek Commons, of which 39.3% had children under the age of 18 living in them. Of all households, 56.2% were married-couple households, 13.8% were households with a male householder and no spouse or partner present, and 19.4% were households with a female householder and no spouse or partner present. About 16.6% of all households were made up of individuals and 4.5% had someone living alone who was 65 years of age or older.

There were 713 housing units, of which 3.6% were vacant. The homeowner vacancy rate was 2.5% and the rental vacancy rate was 6.1%.

Racial composition as of the 2020 census
Race	Number	Percent
White	1,672	84.5%
Black or African American	35	1.8%
American Indian and Alaska Native	3	0.2%
Asian	18	0.9%
Native Hawaiian and Other Pacific Islander	0	0.0%
Some other race	44	2.2%
Two or more races	207	10.5%
Hispanic or Latino (of any race)	219	11.1%
