= 4th Street Theater =

Theatre in Indiana, US

Coordinates: 41.6125°N 87.0556°W

- Former names: North Coast Cultural Association (1990–1998)
- Address: 125 North Fourth Street; Chesterton, Indiana; United States
- Capacity: 50
- Type: Community theater

Construction
- Opened: 2001 (at present location)
- Years active: 1990–present

Website
- https://4thstreetncca.com/

4th Street Theater is a community theater in Chesterton, Indiana, United States. Operated by the nonprofit North Coast Cultural Association, the theater presents plays, musicals, and other theatrical programs in a 50-seat venue in downtown Chesterton in Northwest Indiana.

== History ==
=== North Coast Cultural Association ===
The organization that operates 4th Street Theater was founded in 1990 as the North Coast Cultural Association (NCCA) and initially was located in the former St. Patrick's Catholic Church in Chesterton, Indiana. In 1998, a fire destroyed the church. In 1999, following debt settlement and reorganization, NCCA was given the use of a small building, for a nominal cost, at 125 North Fourth Street in downtown Chesterton. The building was converted into an approximately 50-seat theater, now known as 4th Street Theater. In 2000, it hosted a Footlight Players production of The Complete Works of William Shakespeare (Abridged). NCCA produced its first show at the new venue, The Good War, in 2001.

In 2002, 4th Street Theater joined the Northwest Indiana Excellence in Theater Foundation (NIETF) and says that its productions and participants have received NIETF awards.

== Facilities and organization ==
Early One Evening at Rainbow Bar and Grille, 2012

The theater operated for many years as a tenant before becoming the owner of its performance space. 4th Street Theater is operated by the North Coast Cultural Association as a nonprofit, volunteer community theater. Its activities have received support from public funding programs and organizations including South Shore Arts and the National Endowment for the Arts, through the Indiana Arts Commission. The theater has also received financial support for improvements to its facilities from the Porter County Community Foundation.The theater has also received financial support for improvements to its facilities from the Porter County Community Foundation.

The theater is listed by Indiana Dunes Tourism and participates in the Chesterton Arts District promotion of the community's cultural organizations.

== Activities ==
An Inspector Calls, 2022

Into the Woods, 2016

The theater's seasons of plays and musicals featuring volunteer performers, directors, designers and technicians. Among its productions have been Arthur Miller's All My Sons, John Patrick Shanley's Outside Mullingar, Samuel Beckett's Waiting for Godot, Marsha Norman's 'night, Mother and Ian McWethy's Bad Auditions by Bad Actors, Jim Holt's Sleeping Indoors, a one-person adaptation of Charles Dickens's A Christmas Carol, The Crucible, Death of a Salesman, The Lion in Winter, A Streetcar Named Desire, Nine, The Shadow Box, Of Mice and Men, Who's Afraid of Virginia Woolf, An Inspector Calls, Amadeus, Sweeney Todd: The Demon Barber of Fleet Street, The Secret Garden, Agnes of God, Jane Eyre, Man of La Mancha, Into the Woods, Sunset Boulevard, Parade, Ordinary Days, Peter and the Starcatcher, The Bridges of Madison County, The Da Vinci Code, Hamlet, Baskerville: A Sherlock Holmes Mystery, To Kill a Mockingbird and Art.

Its 2016–2017 production of I Never Saw Another Butterfly about the experiences of children imprisoned in the Theresienstadt concentration camp during the Holocaust, received NIETF awards, including Best Play. In July 2026, Dan Gue, a Northwest Indiana artist, gifted to the theater a mural that he created. The installation was associated with the theater's participation in the Indiana Dunes Arts & Culture Trail.

Since 2014 the company has operated an annual 10-Minute Play Festival to develop and present short original works by playwrights from the region and other parts of the United States. The eight selected works, presented over several weekends in August and September, are directed and performed by local artists.

== Awards ==
4th Street Theater's awards from NIETF include the following.

- Best Play for Peter and the Starcatcher (2018–2019).
- Best Musical and Best Direction for Ordinary Days (2017–2018).
- Best Play and Best Direction for I Never Saw Another Butterfly (2016–2017).
- Best Musical for Jane Eyre (2014–2015).
- Best Musical for Sweeney Todd: The Demon Barber of Fleet Street (2013–2014).
- Best Musical for The Secret Garden (2012–2013).
- Best Musical for Nine (2009–2010).
- A Presidential Award for Excellence for the theater's involvement with The Red Kite Project (2017–2018).
