= Kouts, Indiana =

- Town
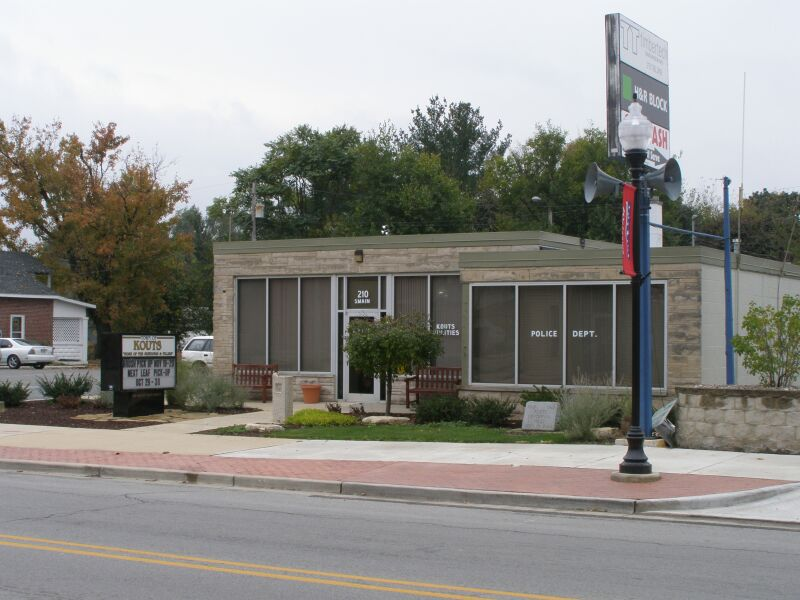
- Kouts Town Hall

- Location of Kouts in Porter County, Indiana.
- Coordinates: 41°19′02″N 87°01′36″W
- Country: United States
- State: Indiana
- County: Porter
- Township: Pleasant
- Established: 1865

Government
  - Type: town council
  - president: Tim Jones

Area
  - Total: 1.21 sq mi (3.14 km^{2})
  - Land: 1.21 sq mi (3.14 km^{2})
  - Water: 0 sq mi (0.00 km^{2})
- Elevation: 682 ft (208 m)

Population (2020)
  - Total: 2,028
  - Density: 1,671.4/sq mi (645.34/km^{2})
- Time zone: UTC-6 (CST)
  - Summer (DST): UTC-5 (CDT)
- ZIP code: 46347
- Area code: 219
- FIPS code: 18-40518
- GNIS feature ID: 2396697
- Website: www.koutsindiana.org

Kouts is a town in Pleasant Township, Porter County, in the U.S. state of Indiana. The population was 2,028 at the 2020 census. Since 2010, Kouts has had a population growth of 7.90 percent.

== History ==
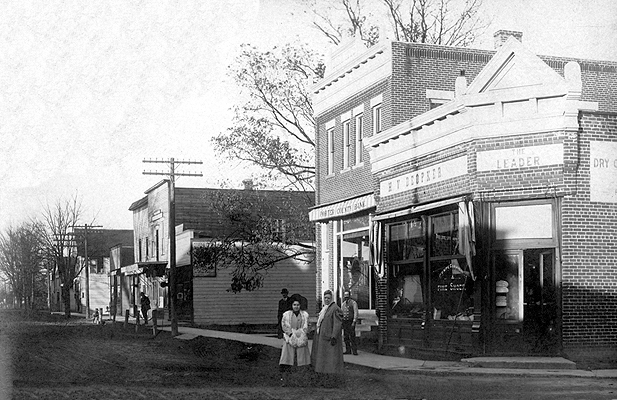
Main Street, 1910

Bernhardt Kautz moved here from Pennsylvania, before the arrival of the railroads, and established a farm where the town now sits. With the arrival of the Chicago and St. Louis Railway in 1865, Kautz and his brother-in-law H.A. Wright laid out the town and established a store. Known as Kouts Station, the town grew slowly until the Chicago and Erie Railroad intersected the line in Kouts. Soon, Kouts became the social and economic center of the township.

=== Railroads ===
Kouts would remain an important railroad town throughout the first half of the 20th century continuing to be served by the Erie Lackawanna Railway and the Pennsylvania Railroad. Railroad traffic in the town began to decline following the bankruptcy of the Pennsylvania Railroad's successor, the Penn Central and the creation of Conrail. As the also bankrupt Erie Lackawanna would similarly be absorbed into the new company in 1976. The surplus of Conrail track through Kouts would lead to a decline in both traffic and profitability. The passage of the Staggers Rail Act of 1980 allowed for U.S. railways to abandon unprofitable lines, which Conrail would take advantage of in Kouts. First with the Erie Lackawanna tracks in 1981 and then the Pennsylvania tracks in 1984. Currently there are little remnants of Kouts railroading past except for the former Pennsylvania Railroad depot which has been converted into a private business.

== Geography ==
According to the 2010 census, Kouts has a total area of 1.12 square miles (2.90 km^{2}), all land.

== Demographics ==
Historical population
Census	Pop.	Note	%±
1880	214		—
1930	583		—
1940	732		25.6%
1950	718		−1.9%
1960	1,007		40.3%
1970	1,388		37.8%
1980	1,619		16.6%
1990	1,603		−1.0%
2000	1,698		5.9%
2010	1,879		10.7%
2020	2,028		7.9%
Source: US Census Bureau

=== 2020 census ===
As of the 2020 census, Kouts had a population of 2,028. The median age was 37.1 years. 25.8% of residents were under the age of 18 and 15.6% of residents were 65 years of age or older. For every 100 females there were 95.4 males, and for every 100 females age 18 and over there were 93.6 males age 18 and over.

0.0% of residents lived in urban areas, while 100.0% lived in rural areas.

There were 798 households in Kouts, of which 36.0% had children under the age of 18 living in them. Of all households, 53.3% were married-couple households, 16.4% were households with a male householder and no spouse or partner present, and 23.3% were households with a female householder and no spouse or partner present. About 26.3% of all households were made up of individuals and 13.6% had someone living alone who was 65 years of age or older.

There were 842 housing units, of which 5.2% were vacant. The homeowner vacancy rate was 1.3% and the rental vacancy rate was 3.4%.

Racial composition as of the 2020 census
Race	Number	Percent
White	1,879	92.7%
Black or African American	6	0.3%
American Indian and Alaska Native	4	0.2%
Asian	3	0.1%
Native Hawaiian and Other Pacific Islander	0	0.0%
Some other race	22	1.1%
Two or more races	114	5.6%
Hispanic or Latino (of any race)	92	4.5%

=== 2010 census ===
As of the census of 2010, there were 1,879 people, 719 households, and 524 families residing in the town. The population density was 1,677.7 inhabitants per square mile (647.8/km^{2}). There were 753 housing units at an average density of 672.3 per square mile (259.6/km^{2}). The racial makeup of the town was 97.6% White, 0.3% African American, 0.3% Native American, 0.6% Asian, 0.2% from other races, and 1.0% from two or more races. Hispanic or Latino of any race were 5.1% of the population.

There were 719 households, of which 37.8% had children under the age of 18 living with them, 61.2% were married couples living together, 8.6% had a female householder with no husband present, 3.1% had a male householder with no wife present, and 27.1% were non-families. 22.9% of all households were made up of individuals, and 10.8% had someone living alone who was 65 years of age or older. The average household size was 2.61 and the average family size was 3.09.

The median age in the town was 35.5 years. 27.8% of residents were under the age of 18; 5.6% were between the ages of 18 and 24; 32.2% were from 25 to 44; 21% were from 45 to 64; and 13.6% were 65 years of age or older. The gender makeup of the town was 48.2% male and 51.8% female.

=== 2000 census ===
As of the census of 2000, there were 1,698 people, 678 households, and 499 families residing in the town. The population density was 1,522.0 inhabitants per square mile (587.6/km^{2}). There were 720 housing units at an average density of 645.4/sq mi (248.2/km^{2}). The racial makeup of the town was 99.00% White, 0.12% Asian, 0.65% from other races, and 0.24% from two or more races. Hispanic or Latino of any race were 1.24% of the population.

There were 678 households, out of which 34.1% had children under the age of 18 living with them, 60.5% were married couples living together, 9.9% had a female householder with no husband present, and 26.4% were non-families. 23.3% of all households were made up of individuals, and 9.6% had someone living alone who was 65 years of age or older. The average household size was 2.50 and the average family size was 2.94.

In the town the population was spread out, with 24.9% under the age of 18, 8.2% from 18 to 24, 31.2% from 25 to 44, 21.7% from 45 to 64, and 14.0% who were 65 years of age or older. The median age was 36 years. For every 100 females, there were 97.2 males. For every 100 females age 18 and over, there were 95.3 males.

The median income for a household in the town was $44,850, and the median income for a family was $50,819. Males had a median income of $42,315 versus $25,313 for females. The per capita income for the town was $19,239. About 1.7% of families and 3.2% of the population were below the poverty line, including 3.3% of those under age 18 and 3.4% of those age 65 or over.

== Education ==
Kouts is served by the East Porter County School Corporation. It has one school which is K-12. Kouts is also home to the East Porter County School Corporation's central administration office which oversees the operation of four other public schools in Porter County. Kouts schools spend an average of $4,027 per student. The average school expenditure in the U.S. is $5,678. There are about 18.7 students per teacher.

Kouts has a public library, a branch of the Porter County Public Library System.

== Infrastructure ==
=== Transportation ===
- State Route 8 goes west to Hebron and east through LaCrosse to Marshall County.
- State Route 49 goes north past Valparaiso to end at the Indiana Dunes State Park on Lake Michigan and south to State Route 14 in central Jasper County.
