= Shorewood Forest, Indiana =

- Census-designated place
- Location of Shorewood Forest in Porter County, Indiana.
- Coordinates: 41°27′35″N 87°08′59″W
- Country: United States
- State: Indiana
- Counties: Porter
- Township: Union

Area
  - Total: 2.24 sq mi (5.79 km^{2})
  - Land: 1.90 sq mi (4.92 km^{2})
  - Water: 0.34 sq mi (0.88 km^{2})
- Elevation: 771 ft (235 m)

Population (2020)
  - Total: 3,033
  - Density: 1,597.4/sq mi (616.76/km^{2})
- Time zone: UTC-6 (Central (CST))
  - Summer (DST): UTC-5 (CDT)
- ZIP code: 46385
- Area code: 219
- FIPS code: 18-69642
- GNIS feature ID: 2631622
- Website: www.shorewoodforest.com

Shorewood Forest is a census-designated place (CDP) in Union Township, Porter County, in the U.S. state of Indiana. The community centers on Lake Louise, an artificial water body. The population of the CDP was 3,033 at the 2020 census.

== Geography ==
Shorewood Forest is located 6 miles (10 km) west of Valparaiso, the county seat. U.S. Route 30, the Lincoln Highway, forms the northern boundary of the CDP.

According to the United States Census Bureau, the CDP has a total area of 2.2 square miles (5.8 km^{2}), of which 1.9 square miles (4.9 km^{2}) is land and 0.35 square miles (0.9 km^{2}), or 15.13%, is water, consisting of the impoundment known as Lake Louise. The lake is located on a tributary of Salt Creek, which is part of the Little Calumet River watershed.

== Demographics ==
Historical population
Census	Pop.	Note	%±
2020	3,033		—
U.S. Decennial Census

=== 2020 census ===
As of the 2020 census, Shorewood Forest had a population of 3,033. The median age was 48.0 years. 20.8% of residents were under the age of 18 and 23.3% of residents were 65 years of age or older. For every 100 females there were 101.4 males, and for every 100 females age 18 and over there were 98.3 males age 18 and over.

100.0% of residents lived in urban areas, while 0.0% lived in rural areas.

There were 1,081 households in Shorewood Forest, of which 32.9% had children under the age of 18 living in them. Of all households, 76.4% were married-couple households, 10.5% were households with a male householder and no spouse or partner present, and 8.9% were households with a female householder and no spouse or partner present. About 10.4% of all households were made up of individuals and 6.5% had someone living alone who was 65 years of age or older.

There were 1,137 housing units, of which 4.9% were vacant. The homeowner vacancy rate was 1.6% and the rental vacancy rate was 0.0%.

Racial composition as of the 2020 census
Race	Number	Percent
White	2,670	88.0%
Black or African American	81	2.7%
American Indian and Alaska Native	6	0.2%
Asian	63	2.1%
Native Hawaiian and Other Pacific Islander	0	0.0%
Some other race	16	0.5%
Two or more races	197	6.5%
Hispanic or Latino (of any race)	157	5.2%
