= Furnessville, Indiana =

- Unincorporated community
- Location within Indiana Location within the United States
- Coordinates: 41°39′06″N 87°00′27″W
- Country: United States
- State: Indiana
- County: Porter
- Township: Westchester
- Elevation: 659 ft (201 m)
- Time zone: UTC-6 (Central (CST))
  - Summer (DST): UTC-5 (CDT)
- ZIP code: 46304
- Area code: 219
- GNIS feature ID: 434907

Furnessville is an unincorporated community in Westchester Township, Porter County, in the U.S. state of Indiana.

== History ==
A post office was established at Furnessville in 1861, and remained in operation until 1919. The community was named after Edwin L. Furness, a local postmaster.
