= Boone Grove, Indiana =

- Unincorporated town and Census-designated place
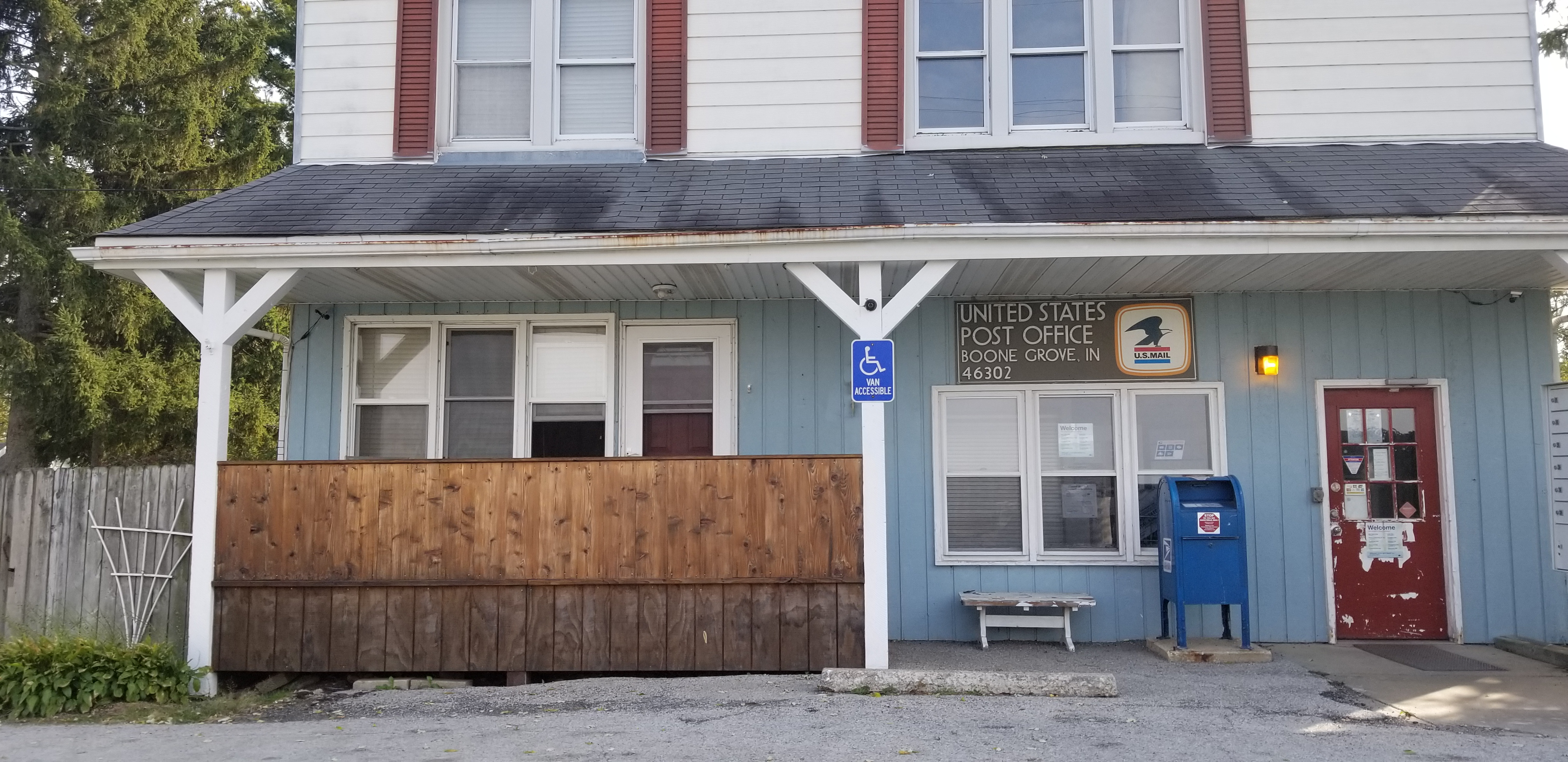

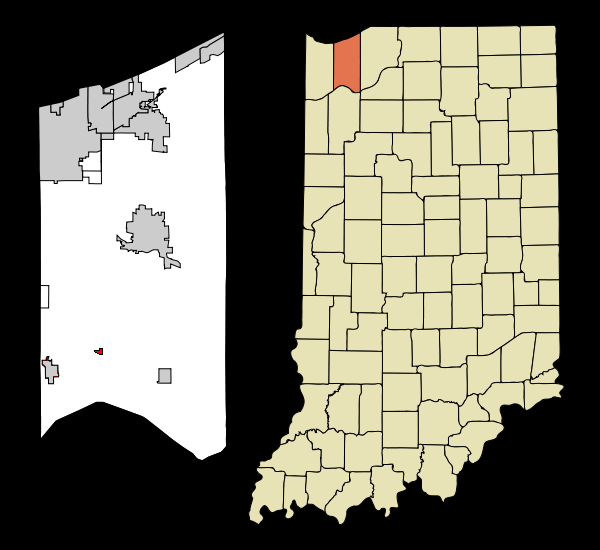
- Location in the state of Indiana

- Location within Indiana Location within the United States
- Coordinates: 41°21′17″N 87°08′03″W
- Country: United States
- State: Indiana
- County: Porter
- Township: Porter

Area
  - Total: 0.28 sq mi (0.72 km^{2})
  - Land: 0.28 sq mi (0.72 km^{2})
  - Water: 0 sq mi (0.0 km^{2})
- Elevation: 719 ft (219 m)

Population (2000)
  - Total: 80
  - Density: 290/sq mi (111/km^{2})
- Time zone: UTC-6 (Central (CST))
  - Summer (DST): UTC-5 (CDT)
- ZIP code: 46302
- Area code: 219
- GNIS feature ID: 2830497

Boone Grove is an unincorporated town in Porter County, Indiana, southwest of the city of Valparaiso.

== History ==
Boone Grove originated as the Boon Grove Post Office (no "e") on December 28, 1843, about 1.5 miles (2.4 km) northeast of its current location. In 1881–82, the Chicago and Erie Railroad was built through the township and the post office moved to the current location, along with most of the original community members.

The town witnessed its greatest growth between 1890 and 1910. The Modern Woodmen of America Lodge (1908) at the corner of Main Street and County Road 350 West is a reminder of this period. The Porter Township High School was constructed in 1913 on Main Street at Lucretia Street. Although significantly changed with additions, it remains the township's elementary and middle school.

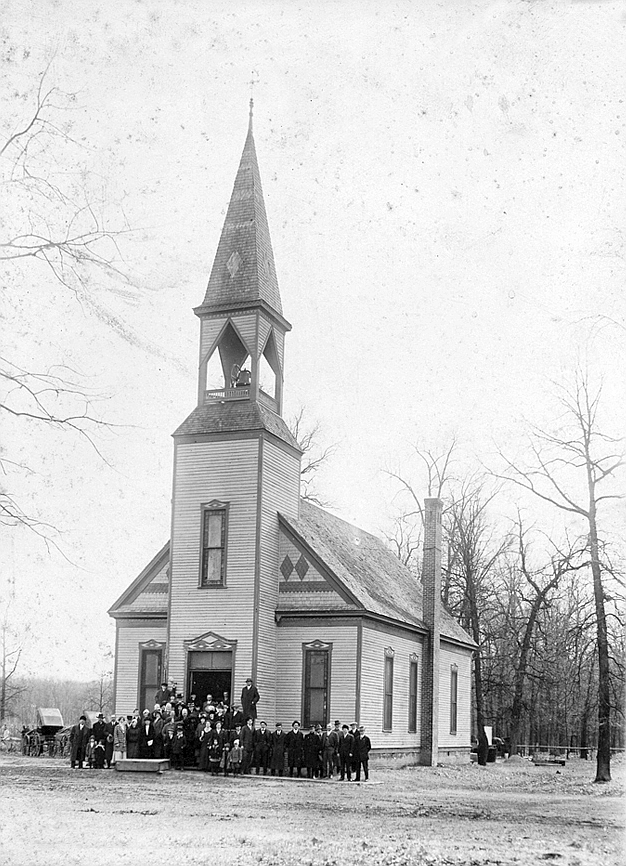
Church in Boone Grove, circa 1910

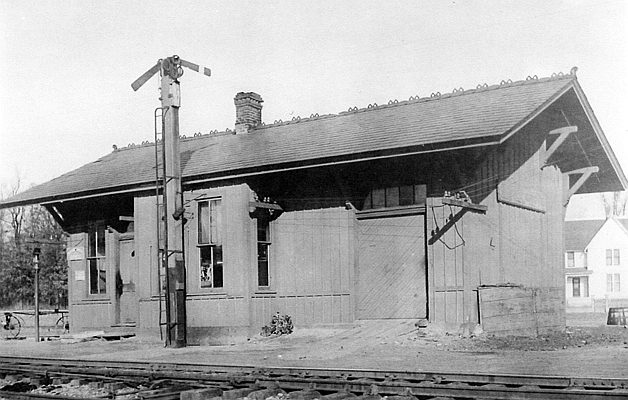
Railroad station, 1910

== Demographics ==
The United States Census Bureau delineated Boone Grove as a census designated place in the 2022 American Community Survey.

== Schools ==
The current Boone Grove High School is not located in the community of Boone Grove, but rather in Valparaiso, Indiana, although 5.5 miles (8.9 km) outside of that city; County Road 260 South 500 West is the school's postal address. The former high school (which now operates as Boone Grove Elementary and Middle School) is located in Boone Grove adjacent to a farm.

The high school's track and field team practices behind the former high school. The baseball and softball teams each have a field at the high school; however, there are additional ball fields at the former high school. There are four tennis courts at the high school and none at the former high school.

The Boone Grove school mascot is a Wolf; the sports teams at Boone Grove High School are nicknamed the "Wolves."

The current Boone Grove Middle School has a mixture of children from the Boone Grove Elementary School and the nearby Porter Lakes Elementary School located on County Road 725 West in Hebron.

Boone Grove High School Baseball won the 2018 IHSAA 2A State Championship, beating Southridge High School 5–4 at Victory Field in Indianapolis, June 19, 2018.

Boone Grove High School Football completed the school's first undefeated regular season in 2019, dominating the Greater South Shore Conference, and compiling a 9–0 record.
