= Crocker, Indiana =

- Unincorporated community
- Location within Indiana Location within the United States
- Coordinates: 41°35′19″N 87°07′27″W
- Country: United States
- State: Indiana
- County: Porter
- Township: Liberty
- Elevation: 637 ft (194 m)
- Time zone: UTC-6 (Central (CST))
  - Summer (DST): UTC-5 (CDT)
- ZIP code: 46304
- Area code: 219
- GNIS feature ID: 433138

Crocker is an unincorporated community in Liberty Township, Porter County, in the U.S. state of Indiana.

== History ==
Crocker was founded in 1892, when railroad service was extended to that point. The community was most likely named for a railroad engineer. A post office was established at Crocker in 1893, and remained in operation until it was discontinued in 1905. In 1894, the Crocker School House was constructed and was closed in 1928. The school house was later sold and became Crocker Bible Baptist Church, the only active church in Crocker. In 1912, Crocker had about 200 inhabitants.
