= Indiana State Road 49 =

State highway in Indiana, United States

State Road 49
- SR 49 highlighted in red

Route information
- Maintained by INDOT
- Length: 44.385 mi (71.431 km)
- Existed: October 1, 1926–present

Major junctions
- South end: SR 14 in Jasper County
- US 30 in Valparaiso; US 6 in Valparaiso I-80 Toll / I-90 Toll / Indiana Toll Road near Chesterton; I-94 near Chesterton; US 20 in Porter; US 12 in Porter
- North end: Indiana Dunes State Park

Location
- Country: United States
- State: Indiana

Highway system
- Indiana State Highway System; Interstate; US; State; Scenic
← SR 48	→ US 50

State Road 49 (SR 49) is a 44.15-mile (71.05 km), north–south state highway in the northwestern part of the U.S. state of Indiana. Its northern terminus is at an intersection with U.S. Route 12 (Dunes Highway) in Porter near the entrance to Indiana Dunes State Park. The southern terminus is a rural intersection with State Road 14 in Barkley Township at Lewiston, 10 miles (16 km) northeast of Rensselaer.

== Route description ==
The southern terminus of SR 49 is in Barkey Township at State Road 14 (SR 14), the site of the former town of Lewiston. SR 49 heads north, passing through Wheatfield and Kouts. At the southern border of Valparaiso, SR 49 becomes a four-lane divided highway and has interchanges with U.S. Route 30 and SR 2. Between Valparaiso and Chesterton, SR 49 has interchanges with U.S. Route 6 and Interstate 80/Interstate 90/Indiana Toll Road. In Chesterton, SR 49 has an interchange with Interstate 94 before passing into Porter, where it has an interchange with U.S. Route 20. North of the interchange with US 20, the road is again a two-lane road to its northern terminus at the intersection with U.S. Route 12.

== History ==
Before 1926, SR 49 was a named Liberty Way from Kouts to Valparaiso, it was a named state route. After 1926, SR 49 was a two-lane highway from Valparaiso to Chesterton, known as "Old State Road 49". When the Valparaiso Bypass was completed the old route was decommissioned and turned over to the City of Valparaiso, the City of Chesterton, and Porter County.

== Major intersections ==
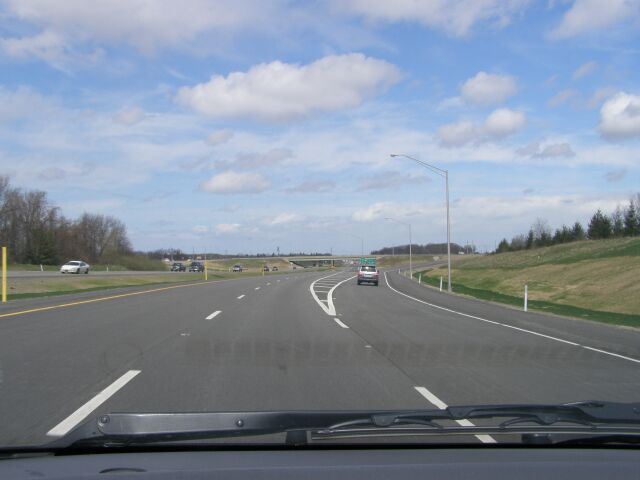
Northbound, approaching US 6 in Porter County

County	Location	mi	km	Destinations	Notes
Jasper	Barkley Township	0.000	0.000	SR 14 – Winamac	Southern terminus;
Jasper	Wheatfield	11.009	17.717	SR 10 – San Pierre, De Motte	
Porter	Kouts	20.442	32.898	SR 8 – La Crosse, Hebron	
Porter	Valparaiso	29.782	47.929	US 30 / SR 2 west – Plymouth, Valparaiso	Interchange; Southern end of SR-2 concurrency
Porter	Valparaiso	30.912	49.748	SR 2 east – La Porte, Valparaiso	Interchange; Northern end of SR-2 concurrency
Porter	Valparaiso	32.532	52.355	Vale Park Road/CR 400 N	Interchange
Porter	Liberty Township	36.632	58.953	US 6 – Westville, Portage	Interchange
Porter	Liberty Township	39.139	62.988	I-80 Toll / I-90 Toll / Indiana Toll Road – Chicago, Toledo	Indiana Toll Road; exit 31
Porter	Chesterton	42.223	67.951	I-94 – Chicago, Detroit	I-94 exit 26; Interchange
Porter	Porter	42.983	69.174	US 20 – Michigan City, Gary	
Porter	Porter	43.762	70.428	US 12 / LMCT – Indiana Dunes National Park, steel mills	
Porter	Porter	44.385	71.431	Indiana Dunes State Park	Northern terminus;
1.000 mi = 1.609 km; 1.000 km = 0.621 mi: Concurrency terminus

== See also ==
- Indiana State Road 149
- Indiana State Road 249
