= Valparaiso Community Schools =

School district in Valparaiso, Indiana, U.S.

Coordinates: 41°30′08.5″N 87°04′02.2″W

Valparaiso Community School Corporation
- VCS Letterhead

Location
- Valparaiso, Indiana; United States

District information
- Type: Public
- Established: 1874
- Superintendent: Jim McCall, PhD
- NCES District ID: 6560

Other information
- Website: www.valpo.k12.in.us

The Valparaiso Community Schools (VCS) is the school system that serves Center Township, Porter County, Indiana, United States. Center Township is predominantly the city of Valparaiso.

== Schools ==
- Valparaiso High School
- Benjamin Franklin Middle School
- Thomas Jefferson Middle School
- Central Elementary School
- Cooks Corner Elementary School
- Flint Lake Elementary School
- Hayes Leonard Elementary School
- Memorial Elementary School
- Parkview Elementary School
- Northview Elementary School
- Thomas Jefferson Elementary School
- Porter County Career Center
