= Indiana State Road 2 =

Highway in Indiana

State Road 2
- SR 2 highlighted in red

Route information
- Maintained by INDOT
- Length: 81.032 mi (130.408 km)
- Existed: October 1, 1926–present

Major junctions
- West end: IL 17 near Lowell
- US 41 near Lowell; I-65 near Dinwiddie; US 231 in Hebron; US 30 in Valparaiso; US 6 in Westville; US 421 in Westville; US 35 in La Porte; US 20 in Rolling Prairie
- East end: US 20 / US 31 in South Bend

Location
- Country: United States
- State: Indiana
- Counties: Lake, Porter, LaPorte, St. Joseph

Highway system
- Indiana State Highway System; Interstate; US; State; Scenic
← SR 1	→ SR 3

State Road 2 (SR 2) in the U.S. state of Indiana is an east–west route running from the Illinois border at Illinois Route 17 east to the outskirts of South Bend, Indiana, at the U.S. Route 20/U.S. Route 31 freeway, also known as the St. Joseph Valley Parkway. This is a distance of 80.98 miles (130.32 km).

== Route description ==
=== Illinois to Valparaiso ===
SR 2 begins at the Illinois–Indiana State Line where Illinois Route 17 ends. SR 2 heads northeast toward U.S. Route 41 (US 41) and is concurrent with US 41 for 2.64 miles (4.25 km). It then heads east toward Lowell; beyond Lowell there is a short concurrency with State Road 55 (SR 55), followed by an interchange with Interstate 65 (I-65) at exit number 240. About 4 miles (6.4 km) to the east, SR 2 joins U.S. Route 231 (US 231) and they are concurrent for 2.17 miles (3.49 km). After SR 2 leaves US 231 it heads north-northeast toward Valparaiso.

=== Valparaiso to LaPorte ===
SR 2 enters Valparaiso from the southwest and joins U.S. Route 30 (US 30). At the State Road 49 (SR 49) exit, SR 2 joins SR 49 north. Soon after SR 2 leaves SR 49 and heads northeast toward LaPorte. Passing through Westville, there is a short concurrency with U.S. Route 421 (US 421).

=== LaPorte to South Bend ===
SR 2 enters LaPorte from the west along with State Road 39 (SR 39). In downtown LaPorte SR 2 has an intersection with U.S. Route 35 (US 35); here, SR 39 is concurrent with US 35. From this point, SR 2 is a four-lane divided highway. SR 2 heads northeast from LaPorte to Rolling Prairie where it meets US 20. Here, US 20 and SR 2 switch alignments at a roundabout interchange; US 20 follows the north and west legs of the interchange, while SR 2 follows the south and east legs. On the west side of South Bend, SR 2 ends at an interchange with US 20 and U.S. Route 31 (US 31).

== History ==
SR 2 has been largely replaced by the Indiana Toll Road (Interstate 80/Interstate 90) and by US 20. SR 2 appears to be part of an old alignment from Kankakee, Illinois, to South Bend and runs more diagonally than other east–west state highways in Indiana.

In Valparaiso, SR 2 has been rerouted around the downtown and central business districts of the city. Instead of traveling through the city along Washington Street, SR 2 shares portions of the routes of US 30 and the Valparaiso Bypass (SR 49).

Several times in its history, SR 2 has run along the path of the Lincoln Highway.

=== Old Indiana State Route 2 ===
Until the completion of the St. Joseph Valley Parkway around the South Bend – Elkhart area, SR 2 continued to downtown South Bend, mostly along Western Avenue (which remains, but no longer has state highway markers). SR 2 originally followed the Lincoln Highway to Fort Wayne before U.S. Route 33 (US 33) supplanted it east of downtown South Bend. Part of SR 2's former routing is now State Road 933 (SR 933).

== Major intersections ==
County	Location	mi	km	Destinations	Notes
Lake	West Creek Township	0.000	0.000	IL 17 west – Kankakee	Continuation into Illinois
Lake	West Creek Township	3.433	5.525	US 41 south – Terre Haute	Southern end of US 41 concurrency
Lake	West Creek Township	6.055	9.745	US 41 north	Northern end of US 41 concurrency
Lake	Cedar Creek Township	12.076	19.434	SR 55 north (Grant Street) – Crown Point, Gary	Western end of SR 55 concurrency
Lake	Cedar Creek Township	12.583	20.250	SR 55 south – Fowler	Eastern end of SR 55 concurrency
Lake	Eagle Creek Township	14.739– 14.889	23.720– 23.962	I-65 – Indianapolis, Gary	
Porter	Hebron	20.099	32.346	US 231 – Lafayette	Southern end of US 231 concurrency
Porter	Hebron	22.124	35.605	SR 8 east	Western terminus of SR 8
Porter	Hebron	22.278	35.853	US 231	Northern end of US 231 concurrency
Porter	Valparaiso	35.706	57.463	US 30 west – Dyer	western end of US 30 concurrency
Porter	Valparaiso	37.864– 38.276	60.936– 61.599	US 30 east / SR 49 south – Fort Wayne	Eastern end of US 30 concurrency; Southern end of SR 49 concurrency
Porter	Valparaiso	38.997	62.760	SR 49 north / Lincoln Highway – Porter	Northern end of SR 49 concurrency
Porter	Washington Township	43.036	69.260	Lincoln Highway (Old State Road 2)	
LaPorte	Clinton Township	46.030	74.078	Lincoln Highway (Old State Road 2)	
LaPorte	Westville	47.003	75.644	Lincoln Highway (1100 West)	
LaPorte	Westville	47.206	75.971	US 6 – Hobart, Bremen	Roundabout
LaPorte	Westville	47.348	76.199	Lincoln Highway (Coulter Road)	
LaPorte	Westville	47.404	76.289	Lincoln Highway (West Main Street)	
LaPorte	Westville	48.102	77.413	US 421 south (North Flynn Street) / Lincoln Highway – Westville, Indianapolis	Southern end of US 421 concurrency
LaPorte	Westville	49.230	79.228	US 421 north – Michigan City	Northern end of US 421 concurrency
LaPorte	La Porte	58.312	93.844	SR 39 south (Longwood Drive)	Western end of SR 39 concurrency
LaPorte	La Porte	58.373	93.942	Lincoln Highway (Colfax Avenue)	
LaPorte	La Porte	58.967	94.898	Lincoln Highway (4th Street)	
LaPorte	La Porte	59.645	95.989	US 35 / SR 39 north (Pine Lake / Indiana Avenue)	Eastern end of SR 39 concurrency
LaPorte	La Porte	59.765	96.182	SR 4 east	Western terminus of SR 4
LaPorte	Rolling Prairie	66.532	107.073	Lincoln Highway (450 East)	
LaPorte	Rolling Prairie	67.976	109.397	US 20 – Michigan City, South Bend	SR 2 and US 20 switch alignments; Roundabout interchange
St. Joseph	South Bend	80.559– 81.032	129.647– 130.408	US 20 / US 31 (St. Joseph Valley Parkway) – Elkhart, Indianapolis, Niles	
1.000 mi = 1.609 km; 1.000 km = 0.621 mi: Concurrency terminus
