= Union Township, Porter County, Indiana =

Union Township
- Township
- Coordinates: 41°28′41″N 87°10′20″W
- Country: United States
- State: Indiana
- County: Porter

Government
  - Type: Indiana township

Area
  - Total: 29.98 sq mi (77.64 km^{2})
  - Land: 29.53 sq mi (76.49 km^{2})
  - Water: 0.44 sq mi (1.15 km^{2})
- Elevation: 748 ft (228 m)

Population (2020)
  - Total: 9,403
  - Density: 298/sq mi (115.2/km^{2})
- Time zone: UTC-6 (Central (CST))
  - Summer (DST): UTC-5 (CDT)
- Area code: 219
- FIPS code: 18-77570
- GNIS feature ID: 453930

Union Township is one of twelve townships in Porter County, Indiana. As of the 2010 census, its population was 8,811, and in 2020, it was 9,403.

Historical population
Census	Pop.	Note	%±
1890	985		—
1900	938		−4.8%
1910	1,069		14.0%
1920	973		−9.0%
1930	909		−6.6%
1940	1,005		10.6%
1950	1,341		33.4%
1960	1,741		29.8%
1970	2,077		19.3%
1980	5,377		158.9%
1990	7,167		33.3%
2000	8,416		17.4%
2010	8,811		4.7%
2020	9,403		6.7%

== History ==
Union Township was organized in 1836, and named for the federal union of the United States.

== Cities and towns ==
The township has no incorporated communities. Wheeler, located in the northern part of the township on State Route 130, continues to be an important community. Union Township also contains the census-designated places of Salt Creek Commons and Shorewood Forest.

== Education ==
The township is served by the Union Township School Corporation. Its high school is Wheeler High School near the community of Wheeler.
