= Porter Township, Porter County, Indiana =

Porter Township
- Township
- Coordinates: 41°23′28″N 87°09′10″W
- Country: United States
- State: Indiana
- County: Porter
- Organized: 1838

Government
  - Type: Indiana township

Area
  - Total: 45.26 sq mi (117.22 km^{2})
  - Land: 44.9 sq mi (116.4 km^{2})
  - Water: 0.32 sq mi (0.82 km^{2})
- Elevation: 719 ft (219 m)

Population (2020)
  - Total: 9,626
  - Density: 208.4/sq mi (80.47/km^{2})
- Time zone: UTC-6 (Central (CST))
  - Summer (DST): UTC-5 (CDT)
- Area code: 219
- FIPS code: 18-61182
- GNIS feature ID: 453760
- Website: portertownshipin.com

Porter Township is one of twelve townships in Porter County, Indiana. As of the 2010 census, its population was 9,367. It contains part of the census-designated place of Lakes of the Four Seasons.

Historical population
Census	Pop.	Note	%±
1890	1,121		—
1900	1,075		−4.1%
1910	1,000		−7.0%
1920	1,055		5.5%
1930	949		−10.0%
1940	1,108		16.8%
1950	1,199		8.2%
1960	1,712		42.8%
1970	2,420		41.4%
1980	6,493		168.3%
1990	7,300		12.4%
2000	8,459		15.9%
2010	9,367		10.7%
2020	9,626		2.8%

== History ==
Porter Township was originally called Fish Lake Township, and under the latter name was organized in 1838. The name was changed to Porter Township in 1841.

== Cities and towns ==
The township has no incorporated communities. Boone Grove, located on the southern boundary of the township continues to be an important community.

== Education ==
The township is served by the Porter Township School Corporation. Boone Grove High School is located northwest of Boone Grove.

== Cemeteries ==
Name	Location	Picture	Ref pg	Ref pg
Fleming Cemetery	Boone Grove Road (200 W)		pg 36	front
Frame Cemetery (private)	675 West			front
Guernsey Cemetery (private)	Division at County Line Road (Lake/Porter)		pg 34	front
Ludington Cemetery (private)	500 West, north of SR 2			front
Merriman Cemetery	250 N at 275 W			front
Shurr Cemetery (private)	300 S, near 500 W			front

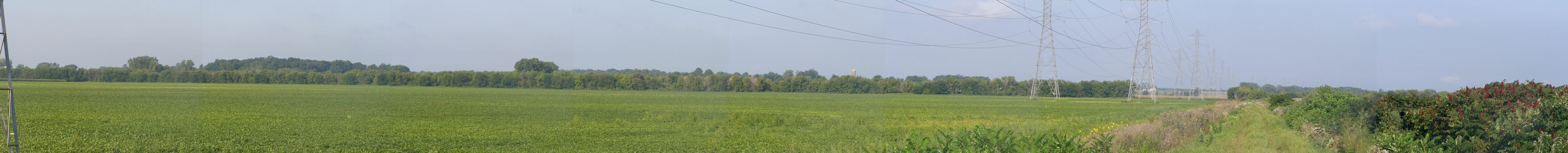
Looking west across the cornfields from Smoke Road at the old (abandoned) Erie-Lackawanna Railroad ROW
