= Liberty Township, Porter County, Indiana =

Liberty Township
- Township
- Seal

- Coordinates: 41°33′38″N 87°04′33″W
- Country: United States
- State: Indiana
- County: Porter
- Organized: 1836

Government
  - Type: Indiana township
  - Trustee: Matthew Keiser (R)

Area
  - Total: 25.03 sq mi (64.84 km^{2})
  - Land: 24.7 sq mi (64.1 km^{2})
  - Water: 0.28 sq mi (0.73 km^{2})
- Elevation: 640 ft (195 m)

Population (2020)
  - Total: 10,908
  - Density: 376.5/sq mi (145.38/km^{2})
- Time zone: UTC-6 (Central (CST))
  - Summer (DST): UTC-5 (CDT)
- Area code: 219
- FIPS code: 18-43362
- GNIS feature ID: 453559
- Website: libertytrustee.com

Liberty Township is one of twelve townships in Porter County, Indiana. As of the 2010 census, its population was 9,319.

Historical population
Census	Pop.	Note	%±
1890	855		—
1900	877		2.6%
1910	881		0.5%
1920	888		0.8%
1930	1,009		13.6%
1940	1,267		25.6%
1950	1,666		31.5%
1960	2,439		46.4%
1970	3,260		33.7%
1980	5,367		64.6%
1990	5,740		6.9%
2000	6,727		17.2%
2010	9,319		38.5%
2020	10,908		17.1%

== History ==
Liberty Township was organized in 1836.

== Cities and towns ==
The town of Chesterton has grown south from Westchester Township and has incorporated parts of Liberty Township along State Route 49 near the Indiana Toll Road. Otherwise, there are no incorporated communities within the township.

== Other locations ==
Goodrum Junction was a rail junction in the township located east of the intersection of present-day County Road 950 North and Indiana State Road 49. The Goodrum station was the intersection of interurban feeder routes arriving from Valparaiso (the Valparaiso and Northern Railway) and Chesterton and the terminus of the only constructed section of the Chicago – New York Electric Air Line Railroad. The station connected the line to Gary and LaPorte with passengers from northern and southern portions of Porter County.

The station was also the location of a 300-kilowatt power generation plant that supplied electricity to the railroad. It was named after George C. Goodrum, a significant investor in the railroad. The plant began operation on July 17, 1911, and was destroyed after it was struck by lightning in 1925. It was rebuilt the next year in a different location.

== Education ==
Liberty Township is served by the Duneland School Corporation. The elementary school is Liberty Elementary, which serves grades K-4. Liberty Intermediate School serves grades 5 and 6. Chesterton Middle School serves grades 7 and 8. Its high school is Chesterton High School which serves grade 9–12.
