= Jackson Township, Porter County, Indiana =

Jackson Township
- Township
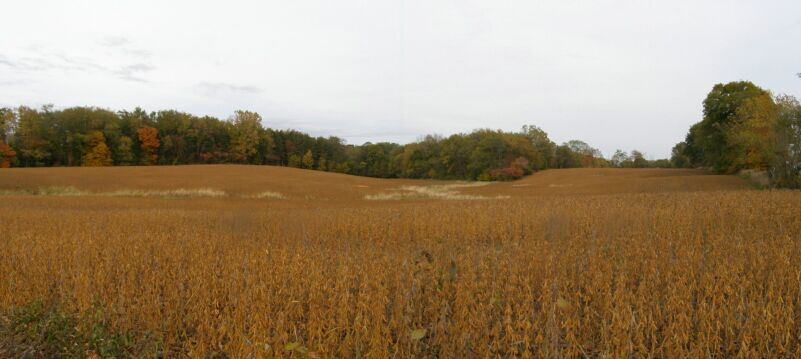
- Rolling hills of Jackson Township

- Coordinates: 41°33′32″N 86°58′46″W
- Country: United States
- State: Indiana
- County: Porter

Government
  - Type: Indiana township

Area
  - Total: 26.97 sq mi (69.86 km^{2})
  - Land: 26.89 sq mi (69.64 km^{2})
  - Water: 0.085 sq mi (0.22 km^{2})
- Elevation: 830 ft (253 m)

Population (2020)
  - Total: 5,573
  - Density: 198.2/sq mi (76.51/km^{2})
- Time zone: UTC-6 (Central (CST))
  - Summer (DST): UTC-5 (CDT)
- Area code: 219
- FIPS code: 18-37314
- GNIS feature ID: 453461

Jackson Township is one of twelve townships in Porter County, Indiana. As of the 2010 census, its population was 5,328.

Historical population
Census	Pop.	Note	%±
1890	1,009		—
1900	938		−7.0%
1910	894		−4.7%
1920	741		−17.1%
1930	656		−11.5%
1940	715		9.0%
1950	781		9.2%
1960	965		23.6%
1970	1,540		59.6%
1980	2,983		93.7%
1990	3,473		16.4%
2000	4,592		32.2%
2010	5,328		16.0%
2020	5,573		4.6%

== History ==
Jackson Township was organized in 1836, and most likely named after President Andrew Jackson, although, after that name became controversial in the 1840s, a latter (1883) account says it was named for Lemuel Jackson, a pioneer settler.

== Cities and towns ==
There are no incorporated communities in the township. However, the extreme southeastern portion of Chesterton does extend down to the northeastern portion of Jackson Township.

== Education ==
Jackson Township is served by the Duneland School Corporation. Their high school is Chesterton High School, located in Chesterton (Westchester Township) to the northwest.
