= Gust Lindstrom Farm =

Historic farm in Indiana, United States

Coordinates: 41°37′36″N 87°08′49″W

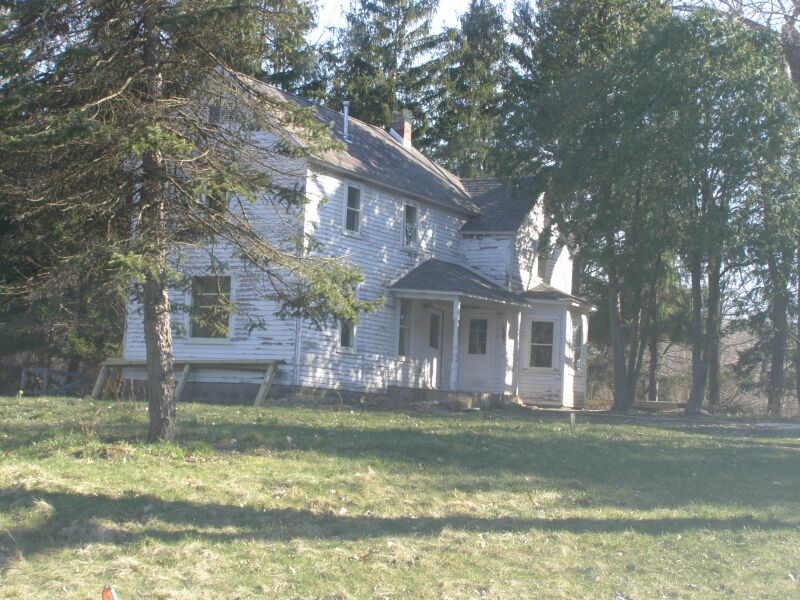
Gust Lindstrom aka Arthur Wahl House before restoration, 399 Howe Road, Porter, Indiana

The Lindstrom/Wahl farm is a historic farmstead located to the south of the former community of Baillytown in Porter County, Indiana.

It was started by Swedish immigrant Gustaf Lindstrom in 1870. Before 1900, Arthur Wahl obtained the property and developed most of the existing structures. The farm exemplifies the prosperity of some early Swedish-American settlers. The residence was originally a two-room log cabin. As the families' wealth increased, a larger residence was constructed around the log cabin and a barn added after 1900. Like other Swedish farmers, the Wahls relied on outside occupations for economic security. They continued to farm and began a nursery in the 1930s.

- Farmhouse - The house has two floors, each rectangular in shape. Later additions include two porches and the summer kitchen on the back. The earlier log cabin is still within the current structure. The cabin had two rooms and is thought to be a hall & parlor design. The current residence was built in the 1900s. The molded concrete block foundation supports a frame structure with lap siding and corner boards. The windows are double hung. The roof is a gable design. A family tradition indicates that members of the Wahl family built the house.
- Barn - The barn, built around 1910, is two stories. It is a vertical board structure with a gambrel roof covered in roll roofing. The building has a concrete foundation. The windows are fixed pane 4 lite. On the east is a double door. The hay track and door are still evident on the south side. Two garage doors were added on the south.

== See also ==
- Swedish Farmsteads of Porter County, Indiana
