= Baillytown, Indiana =

Baillytown
- Former community
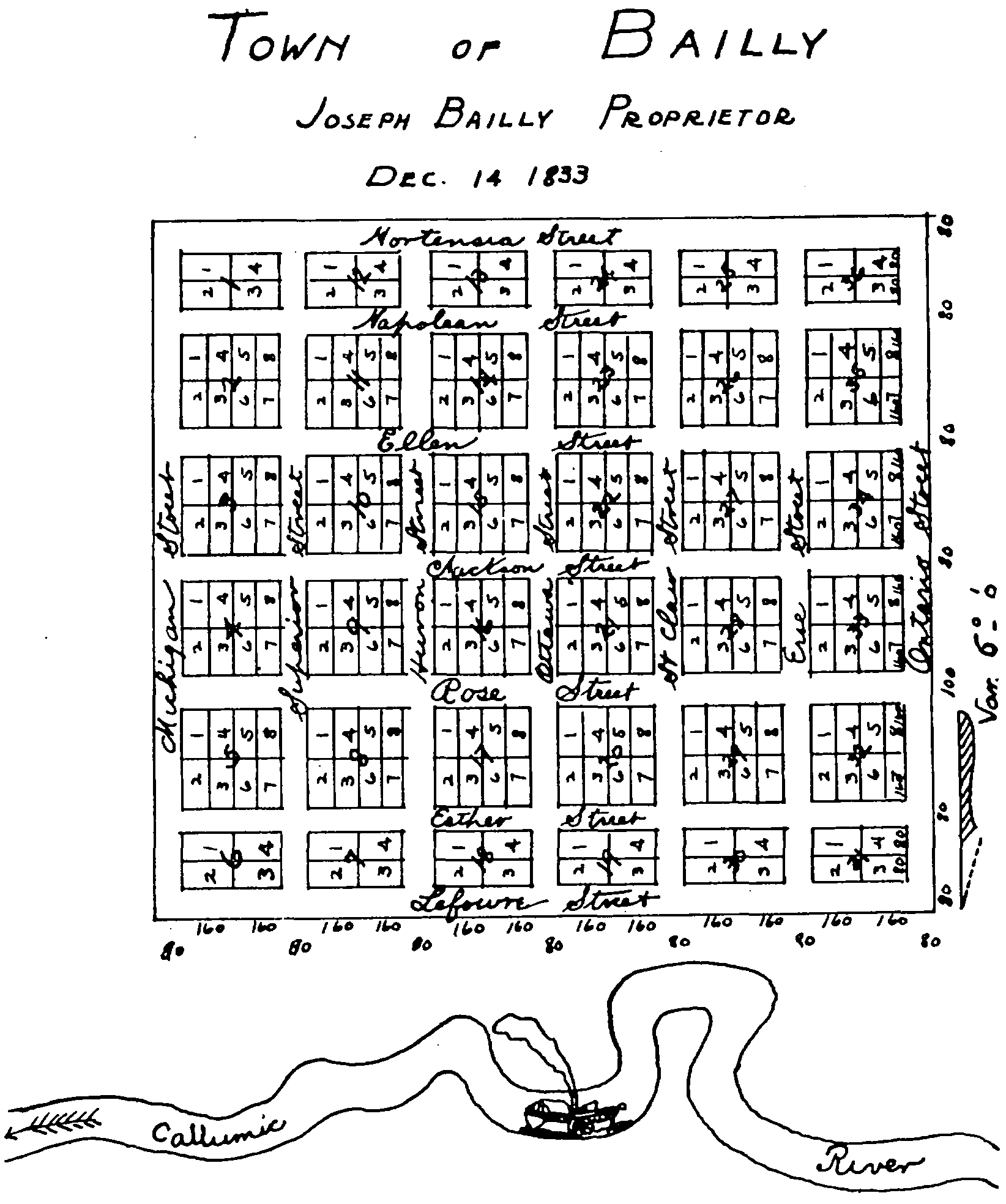
- The planned layout of Bailly, Indiana, as recorded in 1833 by founder Joseph Bailly

- Location within Indiana Location within the United States
- Coordinates: 41.63°N 87.108°W
- Country: United States
- State: Indiana
- County: Porter
- Founded: 1833
- Changed: 1876
- Location: U.S. 12 west of Steel Mill and Power Plant entrance
- Nearest City: Porter, Indiana

Baillytown is a former community in northern Porter County, Indiana, near the present-day communities of Porter and Burns Harbor. Although the town platted as the Town of Bailly was never built, the Baillytown name was used for many years to refer to the area around the original Joseph Bailly trading post. The name continues today as the name of a subdivision, constructed in the 1990s, in the town of Porter.

Baillytown began as a paper community, platted by Joseph Bailly in 1833 near his trading post on the Little Calumet River. Bailly had a group of French Canadians planning on settling in the dunes. When he became ill in 1835, he wrote to these families and recommended that they not journey to the shores of Lake Michigan. The development of a new settlement in the wilderness would be compounded by their lack of English and their lack of experience living among Indians. In the 1830s, the Baillytown name was commonly used for the settlement around the Bailly trading post, which saw frequent visits from Potawatomi trading parties. Baillytown was on a northern branch of the Sauk Trail, and was also accessible from Lake Michigan via Petit Fort. When stagecoach traffic began in 1833, Baillytown was the last stop before Chicago, a journey that could take between six hours and six days depending on conditions. Subsequently, the Long Pole Bridge, a terrifying thousand-foot wooden bridge, was constructed just west of Baillytown to allow travelers to cross the Little Calumet inland.

== Swedish-American community ==
In the 1850s, Baillytown became home to a growing Swedish-American community. It was originally populated by lumber workers who came to work in the sawmill operated by Bailly's son-in-law, and who later settled on farms in the area. An 1856 account reported about 20 Swedish families in the area, engaged in farming and logging. The immigrants were chiefly from Östergötland.

Religious life in the town began with a visit by pioneer Swedish Lutheran minister Erland Carlsson around 1855. Carlsson reported "a good deal of apathy" toward religion in the community, but the Swedish Lutheran Church of Baillytown was organized in 1858 under the Augustana Synod. The church continues today as the Augsburg Evangelical Lutheran Church in Porter.

The town's residents wanted to ensure that their children did not lose touch with Swedish language and culture. Consequently, a renovated toolshed, which had served as the town school from 1880 to 1885, was used until 1912 for Swedish language classes. A substantial Swedish community also developed in the nearby town of Chesterton, centered on the Hillstrom Organ factory. During this period, it is estimated that Westchester Township had the highest concentration of Swedes in Indiana.

== Legacy and present state ==
In the early 20th century, the Baillytown name was used for a local school, and for a stop on the South Shore Line. One of eight one-room schools in Westchester Township, the Baillytown school was closed in the 1920s as part of the general consolidation of schools. Later, early meetings of the Save the Dunes Council were held in the Baillytown schoolhouse.

Today, the French Canadian and Swedish legacies of Baillytown are commemorated by the Chellberg Farm area of the Indiana Dunes National Lakeshore. It takes its name from the Chellberg (originally Kjellberg) family, who developed a farm on part of the old Bailly property in the 1870s.

== See also ==
- Swedish Farmsteads of Porter County, Indiana

== Works cited ==
- Ball, Timothy Horton (1900). Northwestern Indiana from 1800 to 1900. Donohue & Henneberry, printers.
- McMahon, David (January 1997). "Rediscovering a Swedish Ethnic Past: The National Park Service and Baillytown, Indiana" (PDF). Swedish-American Historical Quarterly. 48 (1): 26–52.
- Schoon, Kenneth J. (2003). Calumet Beginnings. ISBN 978-0-253-34218-8.
- Winquist, Alan H. (1996). "Scandinavians". In Taylor & McBirney (ed.). Peopling Indiana: The Ethnic Experience. ISBN 0871951126.
