= Read Dunes House =

Historic house in Indiana, United States

- U.S. National Register of Historic Places
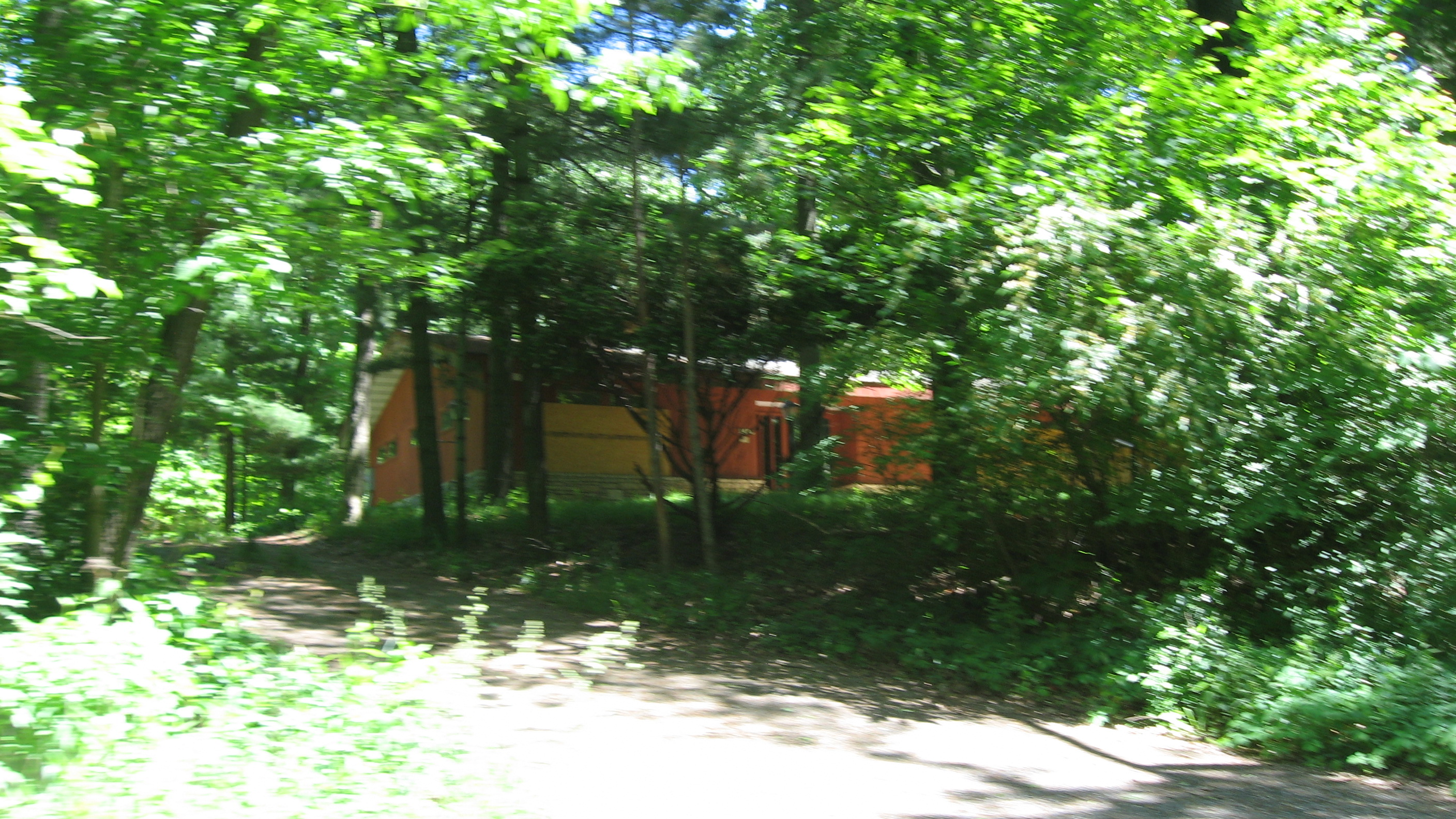
- Read Dunes House, June 2013

- Location within Indiana Location within the United States
- Location: 1453 Tremont Rd., north of Chesterton in Westchester Township, Porter County, Indiana
- Coordinates: 41°38′40″N 87°02′52″W
- Area: 2 acres (0.81 ha)
- Built: c. 1952
- Architect: Read, Herbert P.
- Architectural style: Prairie School
- NRHP reference No.: 10000858
- Added to NRHP: December 8, 2011

Read Dunes House is a historic home in Westchester Township, Porter County, Indiana. It was built in 1952, and is a one-story, Prairie School style dwelling. It measures 58 feet by 29 feet, and has a low-sloped gable roof. The house was built for Philo Benham Read (1882–1961) and his wife Irene Martin Read (1902–1981), who were active in dunes preservation. It was designed by their architect son Herbert P. Read.

The house was listed on the National Register of Historic Places in 2011.
