= Chesterton Tribune =

Community Newspaper in Porter County, Indiana

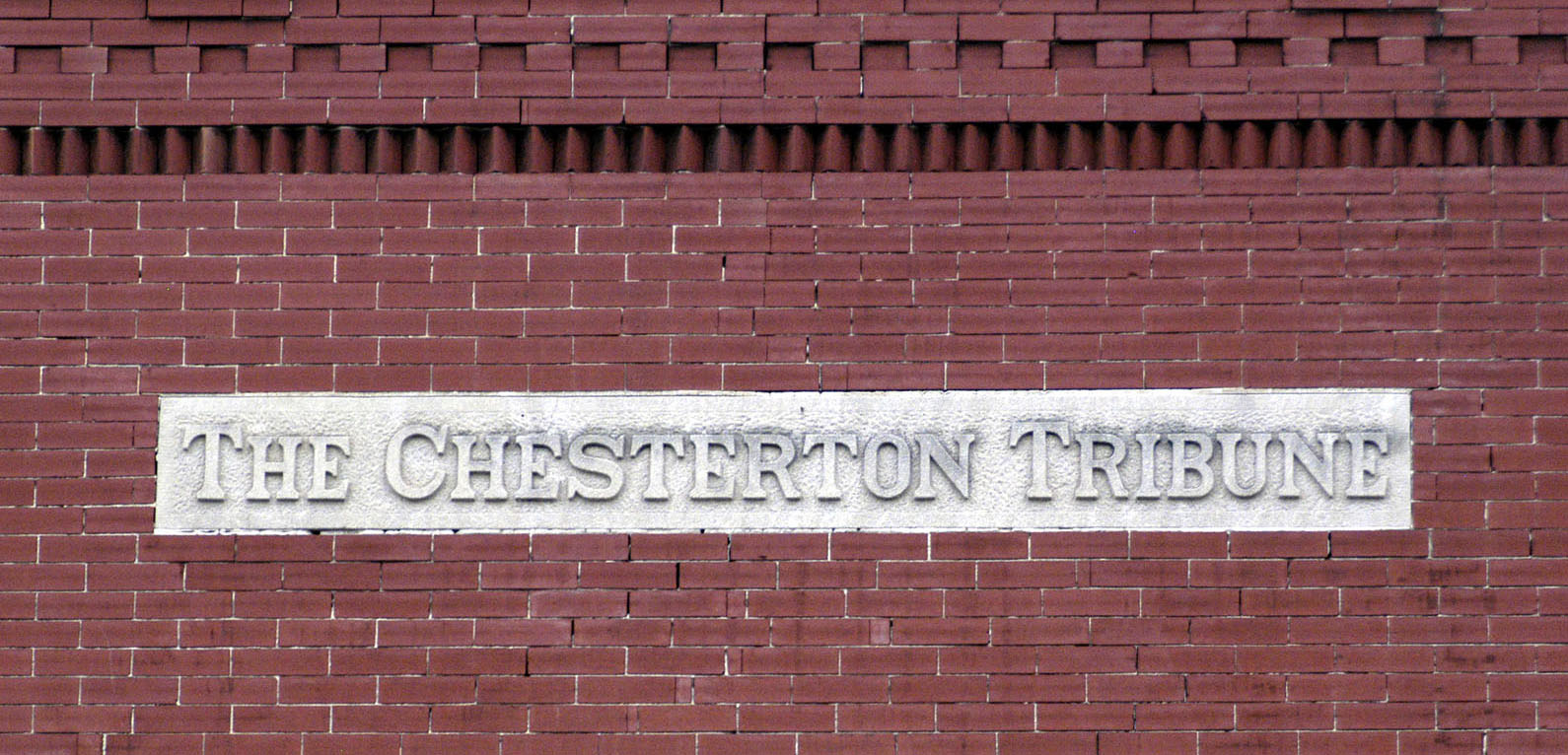
- Type: Weekly newspaper
- Owner: Don Hurd
- Founder: W.W. Mikels
- Publisher: Hoosier Media Group
- Founded: October 1882
- Language: English
- City: Chesterton, Indiana
- Country: US
- Circulation: 4,409
- Website: chestertontribune.com

The Chesterton Tribune is a twice-weekly newspaper based in Chesterton, Indiana, United States serving Chesterton and the Duneland School District in Porter County, The paper ceased publication of its print newspaper on December 30, 2020 but was revived a few months later as a twice weekly community paper by Don Hurd, the owner of a chain of Indiana newspapers. The Tribune publishes Tuesdays and Thursdays with an emphasis on municipal government, community and sports news from the greater Duneland area.

== History ==
The first Chesterton Tribune was launched by W.W. Mikels in October 1882 as a Greenback Party weekly. Mikel lasted as the owner only for a few months until he sold the rights to the paper to the Chesterton Tribune Company. This company was a group of local businessmen and was headed by John Taylor. Taylor had to discontinue the publication of the paper in 1883.

The second Chesterton Tribune was launched in April, 1884 after the Tribune company sent representatives to Valparaiso, Indiana, to offer Arthur J. Bowser the paper for $800. Bowser and lawyer S.D. Watson resumed publication of the Chesterton Tribune on April 2, 1884. The partners also decided to expand their paper to the town of Porter, Indiana. Watson decided to give up his share to Bowser in September 1884. The paper was published every Saturday and had seven columns of print. Bowser also briefly published a Porter Tribune. In April 1896 the Chesterton and Porter editions of the Tribune were combined to create the Westchester Tribune. Since the post office would not renew the postal permit with the new name, Bowser had to change the name back to the Chesterton Tribune in November 1897. In 1910, the price of a yearly subscription to the paper rose from $1.50 a year to $2.00 a year.

In 1928 Warren R. Canright and his wife Phyllis (Post) Canright purchased the Chesterton Tribune. Canright was a college-educated linotype operator and printer who had previously been employed by the Chicago Tribune. In 1961 Warren R. and his sons Warren H. Canright and John E. Canright converted the Chesterton Tribune to a daily newspaper. The new daily paper carried national and international news from United Press International until UPI entered bankruptcy. In its final years as a daily the paper was a member of the Associated Press. After 1981 Warren H. and his wife Elizabeth (Bourne) Canright jointly published the Monday through Friday Chesterton Tribune with their son, David Canright, eventually becoming editor. The newspaper printing plant and editorial offices were at 193 S. Calumet, Chesterton in a building built after the Chesterton fire of 1902 by newspaper founder Bowser. The paper also launched a website, chestertontribune.com. Printed circulation of the paper peaked at more than 5,000 households and then began a slow decline as readers turned away from printed news. Following the deaths of Warren H. and Elizabeth, the paper ceased publication of its print newspaper on December 30, 2020.

The Tribune was revived in 2021 as a twice-weekly, full color paper after being bought by Hometown Media Inc. on March 10, 2021.

== Achievements ==
During World War II Canright sent a free copy of the Tribune to all Chesterton and Porter soldiers.

In 1961 the change from a weekly to daily newspaper was so out of step with the times that the change was mentioned by Time magazine.

In 1970 the Chesterton Tribune switched to an offset printing process, the first paper in the northern Indiana to do so.

The daily Chesterton Tribune was the oldest continuously published independent newspaper in Northwest Indiana. Northwest Indiana is the Calumet Region of Indiana that associates itself more with the city of Chicago than Indianapolis.
