= Swedish Farmsteads of Porter County, Indiana =

The Swedish American Farmsteads of Porter County, Indiana are representative of the numerous rural communities settled by a significant ethnic population. They influenced the religious community and social community. This collection is the most complete early 20th century complex within the Swedish cultural landscape of Baileytown and has retained a great deal of integrity.

== Swedish immigration to Indiana ==
Swedish immigration to Indiana was a by-product of its proximity to Chicago. The proximity to Chicago provided an avenue for Swedish immigrants to reach northern Indiana during the primary migration period from 1840 until 1920. It was driven by the overpopulation and a scarcity of land in Sweden. Coming to America opened new horizons, which were often exaggerated in letters to family back in Sweden.

In addition, it was the middle classes that primarily came. The cost of travel was significant. Only the better off could afford the trip. Thus, those families who were at risk of losing their livelihood and falling in the social stature would risk the trip to America. Initially, before 1860 religious dissenters would also emigrate to America, but his was of only minor importance.

Swedish immigration was focused on the western prairies where land was plentiful. Thus, Chicago became a center for Swedish life in America. By 1920, Swedish-American cultural activities in Chicago included Swedish language newspapers and arts. The construction of a railroad through the region in 1850 expanded the opportunity for immigrants to reach this area. There is a story that a Jonas Asp recruited Swedes to work for Joel H. Wicker cutting lumber for shipment to Chicago. Another story tells of Swedish families driven out of Chicago after the Chicago Fire in 1871, coming east to an already existing Swedish community. By the late 19th century, there was a substantial community along the Little Calumet River.

Bailly Town was settled by 30 members of the Swedes Lutheran Church in 1857. They were associated with the ‘Bethel’ Swedish Community in Miller Beach. In 1863, the first church was built. After the Chicago Fire in 1871, additional families began to arrive.

Community life revolved around the Augsburg Evangelical Lutheran Church in Porter. By the mid-19th century the congregation split in two and founded the Bethlehem Lutheran Church in Chesterton

== Anders Kjellberg Farm ==
The Chellberg Farm is significant as it represents the ethnic heritage of this nearly forgotten Swedish American settlement. Other nearby Swedish landmarks have been restored or preserved, including the Burstrom Chapel and the Burstrom Cemetery.[1] The farm includes the family home, water house with windmill, chicken coop/bunkhouse, and the original barn.

== John Borg Farm ==
aka Clara Samuelson Farm

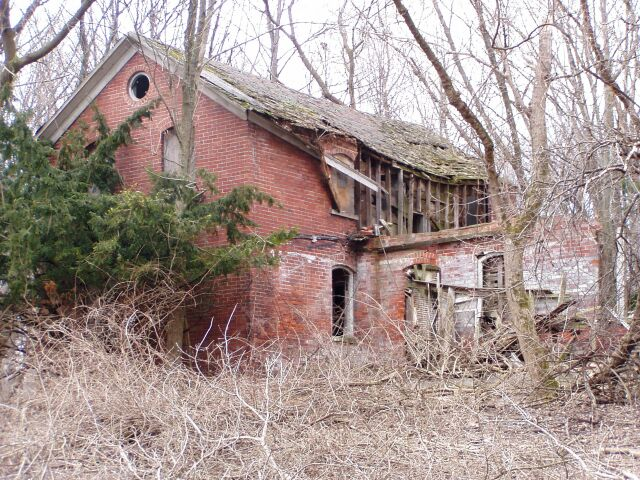
The remains of the John Borg Home.

John Borg purchased the property and began farming on September 4, 1888. Due to the poor quality of the soil, he quickly moved into the new field of animal husbandry. There are no longer any significant landmarks remaining of the farm. The farm was originally 20 acres (8.1 ha) with a later addition to the south to gain access to the Little Calumet River. The entire property was under cultivation at the time of the farm and has slowly returned to immature woodland of silver maple and elms. In the northeast corner of the property, along Oak Hill Road, is the original drainage basin for the farm, funneling water to the east. Today, it is a wetlands forest. The property was heavily impacted by the development of U.S. 20.

Historic Structures

- The main house was a two-story gabled-Ell with a brick facade. The interior plan is a mirror image of the Anders Chellberg main house. It was designed by a local architect, A.J. Lundquist.
- The barn, silo, and other outbuildings have disappeared over time.

== Charles Johnson Farm ==
Charles Johnson purchased 6.78 acres (2.74 ha) from a Charles Anderson, who was living in a log cabin on the site since about 1880. When Johnson purchased the property in 1904, that cabin was the only structure, along with an orchard to the southwest of the main house. One of the Johnsons' daughters regularly went to this farm to purchase apples. When Mr. Anderson suggested that he give her the tree, she became adamant that her parents move it. Since that was not possible, Mr. Johnson asked if he could purchase the property, to which Mr. Anderson replied that he would sell if the Johnsons built him a place back in the woods to live out his life.

== Pete Larsen Farm ==
The property was purchased from the Bailly Homestead by F. Burstrom in the early 1870s. Swedish immigrant Peter Larson was a successful carpenter from Chicago. He was a construction supervisor and spent little time at the farm, traveling home on weekends. He was more prosperous than many. He purchased a Sears catalogue house and contracted help during construction.

== Sugar Bush Farm ==
aka Charles P. Nelson Farm

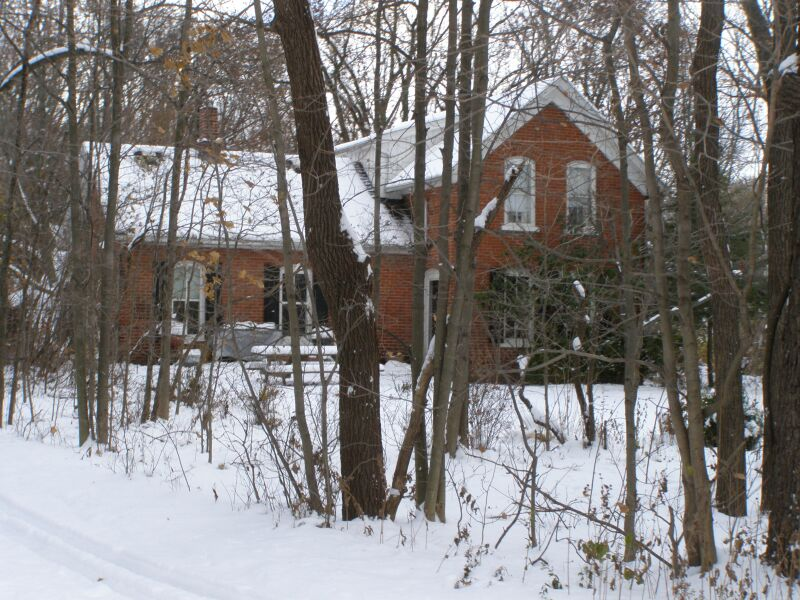
Charles Nelson Farm House

The Charles P. Nelson Farm is a contributing property in the proposed Swedish Farmstead Historic District. The farmhouse remains at 891 N. Mineral Springs Road, Porter, Indiana. Currently (2010) it is a private residence that was built in 1891 using the traditional gabled Ell design. The land and structure are owned by the National Park Service.

In 1876, the property was platted as the property of an E. Allenquist. By 1895, C.P. Nelson and John Nelson were joint owners of this 80 acres (320,000 m^{2}) tract of farmland. By 1906, C.P. Nelson was the sole owner of the property. By 1921, Matilda Nelson is reflected the owner with a C.W. Nelson in residence. This is also the first use of the term 'Sugar Bush Farm'.

Historic Structures

- Farm House

== Gustaf Lindstrom Farm ==
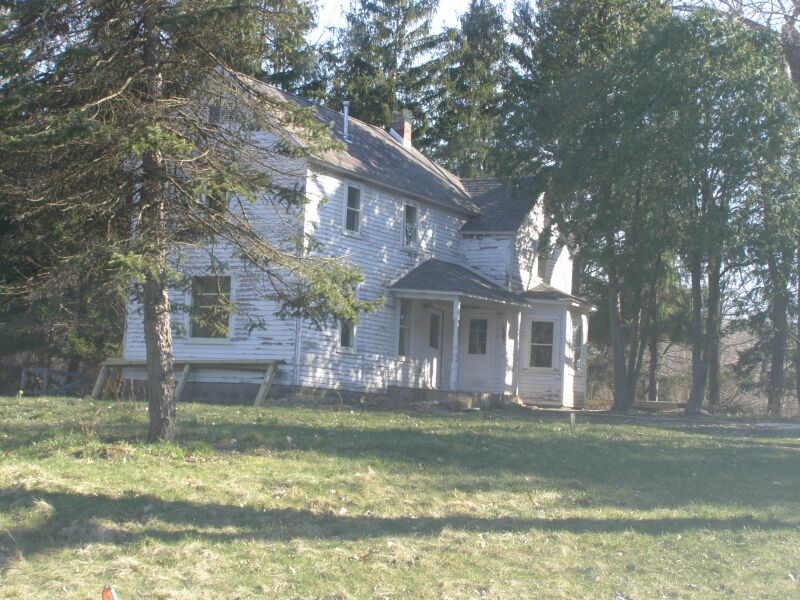
Gustaf Lindstrom house, last owned by Arthur Wahl

The Lindstrom/Wahl farm started by Swedish immigrant Gustaf Lindstrom in 1870. It's located to the south of Baileytown. Before 1900, Arthur Wahl obtained the property and developed most of the existing structures. The farm illustrates the prosperity of some of the early Swedish settlers. The residence was originally a two-room log cabin. As the families wealth increased, a larger residence was constructed around the log cabin and a barn added. This was after 1900. Like other Swedish farmers, the Wahls relied on an outside occupations for economic security. They continued to farm and began a nursery in the 1930s.

== Associated Properties ==
Located outside the National Lakeshore are several other historic structures related to the Swedish Farmstead Historic District, but not included.

=== Burstrom Cemetery ===
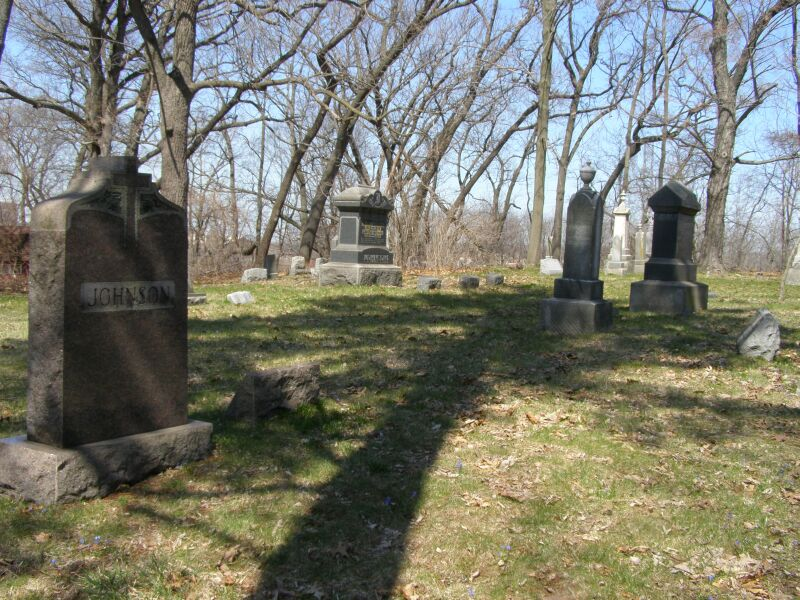
Old Swedish Cemetery

Located on E. Oak Hill Road, Porter, Indiana, north of the Swedish Skola. The cemetery was started in 1870 and is still privately owned.

=== Augsberg Svenska Skola ===
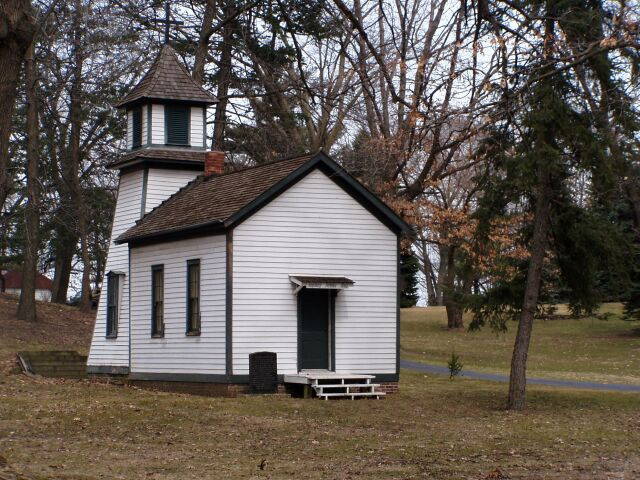
Old Swedish School House

Initially built in 1880, additional work was done in 1934. The structure was built by 19th-century Swedish immigrants to the United States. It reflects church architectural traditions of Sweden. The bell tower is off-center as was common in Sweden. Unlike in Sweden, the bell tower has been enclosed and the lower room that was created is used for tools and wood storage. The structure has been adapted from a traditional architectural form that dates from the Middle Ages.

The Augsberg Svenska Skola is a contributing property in the proposed Swedish Farmstead Historic District. It is located on East Oak Hill Road in Porter, Indiana. The school and church was built in 1880. It is a one-room design with a Gabled front.

=== Westchester Township School District No. 4 ===
Westchester Township School District No.4 is a contributing property in the proposed Swedish Farmstead Historic district. The structure is privately owned at the corner of Waverly Road and Oak Hill Road, in Porter, Indiana. This was the first school house to serve the Swedish community. It was built in 1881. It is rectangular in shape with a gabled front.

=== Augsburg Cemetery ===
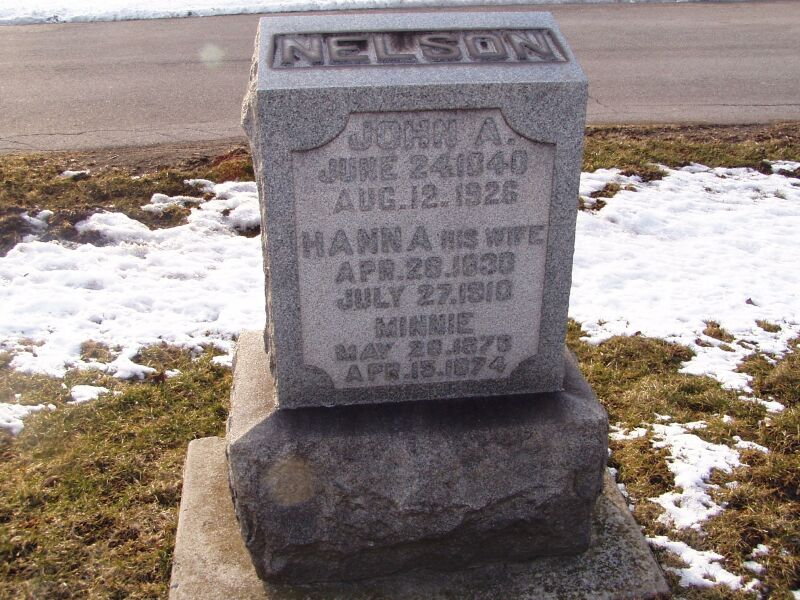
Charles Nelson's Tombstone in the Augsburg Cemetery

Augsburg Cemetery (1878) is a contributing property for a Swedish Farmstead Historic District. It is the final resting place for many of the original Swedish families from the area. The cemetery is located south of Augsburg Lutheran Church on Beam Road in Porter, Indiana.

=== Bethlehem Lutheran Church ===
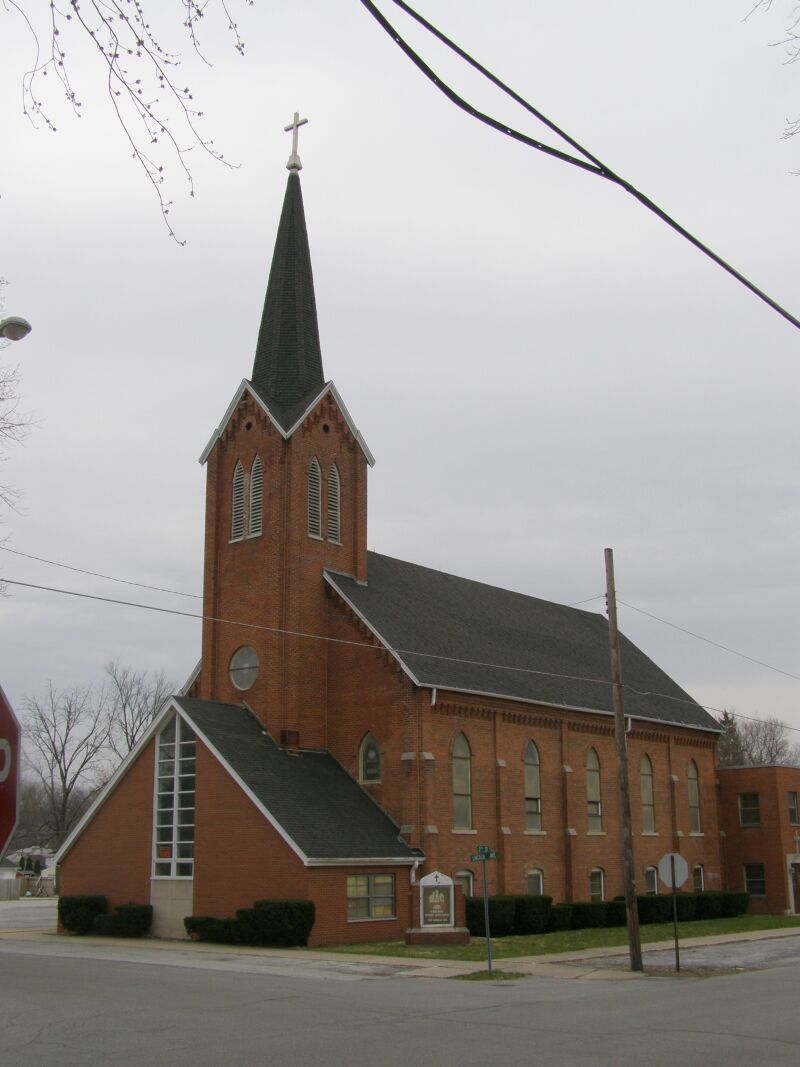
Now closed

Bethlehem Lutheran Church is a contributing property in the proposed Swedish Farmstead Historic District. The church is not located near the historic farms, but in town at the corner of Lincoln Ave and Second Street, Chesterton, Indiana. The Gothic Revival building was built in 1880. The original building is currently owned by the Boys and Girls Club of Chesterton, Indiana. The church moved near Dogwood Park for more accessibility.
