= Wizard of Oz festival =

Annual festival in Chesterton, Indiana

The Wizard of Oz festival was an annual festival in Chesterton, Indiana for The Wizard of Oz.

== History ==
It was cancelled in 2008 after 27 years following poor financial performance due a complicated history with town government, the declining health of actors from the 1939 movie, and a severe storm that essentially stopped the 2008 festival dead in its tracks. The festival was revived in the fall of 2009 under new management and greatly overhauled in structure and organization. It was once again cancelled in 2013 when the primary sponsor dropped the festival last minute, leaving the event without any financial backing. Smaller organizations and dedicated fans worked tirelessly in an attempt to save the festival. Unfortunately, it was all to no avail. To this date, there is still a large demand from fans to bring the festival back to the small Indiana town.
