= Westchester Township, Porter County, Indiana =

Westchester Township
- Township
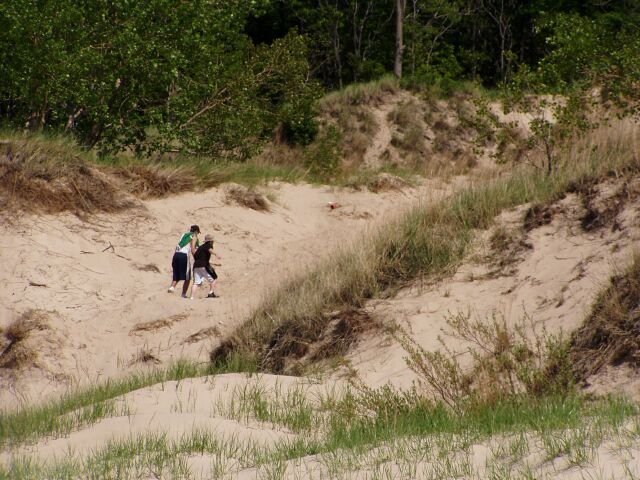
- Indiana Dunes State Park

- Seal

- Coordinates: 41°37′33″N 87°04′18″W
- Country: United States
- State: Indiana
- County: Porter

Government
  - Type: Indiana township
  - Trustee: Suzanne Philbrick

Area
  - Total: 35.85 sq mi (92.86 km^{2})
  - Land: 32.05 sq mi (83.01 km^{2})
  - Water: 3.80 sq mi (9.85 km^{2})
- Elevation: 679 ft (207 m)

Population (2020)
  - Total: 20,635
  - Density: 605.2/sq mi (233.66/km^{2})
- Time zone: UTC-6 (Central (CST))
  - Summer (DST): UTC-5 (CDT)
- Area code: 219
- FIPS code: 18-82484
- GNIS feature ID: 454047
- Website: westchestertrustee.org

Westchester Township is one of twelve townships in Porter County, Indiana. It is included in the Calumet, Northwest Indiana, and Great Lakes regions. It is located on the southern shore of Lake Michigan, about 50 miles (80 km) southeast of Chicago. It stretches from the famous Indiana Dunes on its northern border, south to the Valparaiso Moraine, a ridge of rolling hills left by the last glacier to pass through the area. As of the 2010 census, its population was 19,396.

Historical population
Census	Pop.	Note	%±
1890	2,629		—
1900	2,455		−6.6%
1910	2,953		20.3%
1920	3,319		12.4%
1930	3,813		14.9%
1940	4,997		31.1%
1950	6,827		36.6%
1960	10,899		59.6%
1970	13,652		25.3%
1980	15,311		12.2%
1990	15,511		1.3%
2000	18,133		16.9%
2010	19,396		7.0%
2020	20,635		6.4%

== Geography ==
=== Towns ===
- Burns Harbor
- Dune Acres
- Chesterton (vast majority)
- Porter

=== Former communities ===
- Baillytown
- City West
- Tremont

== Education ==
Westchester Township is served by the Duneland School Corporation. Its high school is Chesterton High School, its middle school is Chesterton Middle School, its intermediate school is Westchester Intermediate School, and its elementary schools are Baily, Brummit, and Yost Elementary Schools.

Westchester Township is served by the Westchester Public Library in Chesterton.

== Parks ==
Westchester Township is the home of Indiana Dunes State Park and a large portion of Indiana Dunes National Park.

== Geography ==
The land that is now Westchester Township was once completely covered by the Wisconsin Ice Sheet. Later, it was submerged beneath Lake Chicago during one other notable period of the ice sheet's retreat from around Indianapolis to the arctic region where it currently resides. Known for its sand dunes, wetlands, and forests, Westchester Township gives evidence of the dynamic geographical and ecological circumstances brought about by the glacier's last passage. As recently as the 1700s, most of Westchester Township was part of a vast wetland marsh that stretched across the Calumet Region. Today as little as 6.6% of Porter County is wetland habitat, most of which is located within Westchester Township.

=== Drainage ===
Westchester Township is within the Great Lakes Watershed, which eventually empties into the Atlantic Ocean.

=== Rivers and streams ===
Westchester Township is home to the Little Calumet River and several streams, including Dunes Creek (previously named Fort Creek), Willow Creek and its tributaries, Salt Creek and its tributaries, Sand Creek, Coffee Creek, Damon Run, the Swanson-Lamporte Ditch, and Johnson Ditch.

=== Lakes ===
Westchester Township is home to Billington Lake, Morgan Lake, Chubb Lake, and Pratt Lake.

=== Wetlands ===
A notable wetland in the area is Cowles Bog, a fen named after a University of Chicago researcher who became famous for his study of geophysical conditions and ecological succession in the dunes.

=== Sand dunes ===
By far the most notable geographic feature in Westchester Township are the great hills of sand strung along the shoreline of Lake Michigan. These great hills of sand are approximately 50 to 100 yards back from the water and can range from three quarters of a mile to a mile in width. They were first formed by the northwesterly winds which continue to blow across the lake and carry with them sand that washes up on the shore of Lake Michigan. The sand dunes begin to form around trees and clumps of grass that block the wind's path and continue to shift in size and shape depending on weather patterns and human interference. These great hills have been found to move as much as 10 to 15 feet per year. Before settlers came to the region, the dunes had reached a stable, or "dead" point, as they were completely covered by a forest of white pine. As the settlers began to remove the white pine for lumber, many areas of the dunes once again came "alive" and began to shift and move with the wind, weather, and human traffic.

== Plant life ==
Westchester Township, thanks to its sand dunes and marshes, is home to over 1,300 species of flowering plants and ferns. Plants of the desert grow in the same vicinity as plants of the woodland and plants of the prairie. The area is known internationally for this diversity of plant life.

== Wildlife ==
More than three hundred varieties of birds have been found in the area. It is estimated that about half of these are only seasonal residents. Other notable wildlife include deer, bear, wolves, foxes, mink, muskrat, wild ducks and geese.

== Climate ==
Due to the presence of Lake Michigan, which remains relatively cool even in summer, the average summer temperatures are lower in this area than in the rest of Indiana. In autumn and winter, the lake causes a delay in the cooling of the adjacent land (approximately 20 to 30 days behind the rest of northern Indiana). The lake also delays the warming of the area in spring. "Lake effect precipitation," or slightly heavier precipitation due to the evaporation of water from the lake, is very common to the area. The areas east and south of the lake usually experience the heaviest snow and rainfall.

== Prehistory ==
The area now known as Westchester Township was once home to peoples that archaeologists now classify into the Oneota division of Upper Mississippian cultures.

== History ==
The Read Dunes House was listed on the National Register of Historic Places in 2011.

=== Native peoples ===
At the time of French contact in the early to mid-17th century, the area served as seasonal hunting grounds for both the Potawatami and Miami cultures, though the Potawatami were the dominant people of the region. For a time the territory was part of what the French referred to as New France. The area now known as Westchester Township, along with the surrounding areas, remained under French jurisdiction until the close of the French and Indian War in 1763, when it passed into English hands. The Potawatami, who fought on the side of the French, defended the territory so fiercely that when the English assumed control, they attempted to pacify the Potawatami by creating a great Indian Reserve, which ran from what is now Canada to the Gulf of Mexico. As of 1775, the region was still part of the British Empire's immense Indian Reserve.

During the American Revolutionary War, the Potawatami of the area fought on the side of the English, against the American colonists. In 1776, the newly formed American government claimed nominal control of the region. Until the early 19th century, however, the Potawatami remained the dominant force in the area and remained on good terms with the English. The last time the Potawatami of the area took up arms against the United States was in the War of 1812. The land now known as Westchester Township was included in what Americans referred to first as the Northwest Territory, then the Indiana Territory, and finally the state of Indiana. It was not until 1832 that the American federal government formally extinguished the claims of the Potawatami to the land that is now Westchester Township.

=== Early trails and roads ===
Native American trails criss-crossed the land which is now Westchester Township. The east–west trails include the Lake Shore Trail (later called the Fort Dearborn-Detroit Road), Calumet Beach Trail, the Tolleston Beach Trail, and Trail Creek Trail (which later became known as the Chicago Road). Though no major north–south trails cut through what is now Westchester Township, just west of where the Indiana/Illinois state line now runs stretched the Potawatami Trail (later called the Vincennes Trail). This trail was the only major north–south trail to serve the Westchester Township area. This trail could be reached by taking a smaller north–south trail to the great Sauk (Sac) Trail, which ran through present day Valparaiso, Indiana. All these trails served as primary trade and transportation routes for the Sacs, Mascoutin, Miami, Potawatomi, and the Illiniwek of the region, but also connected these peoples to eastern tribes, like the Ojibwe and the Iroquois, and western tribes, like the Cheyenne and Sioux (Lakota).

=== Explorers ===
The first written records of European exploration in the area are those of Father Jacques Marquette and Louis Joliet in 1673. Marquette again passed through the area in 1675 with Pierre Porteret and Jacques Largilliers. Undoubtedly though, there were many undocumented explorers of the territory that is now Westchester Township prior to these more famous persons.

=== First Settlers ===
The first known European to settle in the area was fur-trader Joseph Bailly, who built his trading post on the north bank of the Little Calumet River in 1822.

=== Early colonial outposts ===
For quite some time the area that is now Westchester Township had close ties with St. Joseph Mission and Fort St. Joseph, both of which were located northeast of the area, in what is now southern Michigan. The fort served as the nearest trading center for the peoples in and around the land that is now Westchester Township up until the establishment of Fort Dearborn in 1803. Petite Fort, located at the mouth of Fort Creek (now Dunes Creek) in what is now the Indiana Dunes State Park, also served as a collection point for the fur trade in the area until 1779.

=== Early subsistence economy ===
Probably even before the Potawatomi came to the region, the area's abundant natural resources fed many other native peoples and animals. Among the Potawatomi and the first settlers, these abundant resources proved more than adequate for subsistence and very lucrative for trade. There were the cranberry marshes, from which bushel upon bushel was hauled to early market. There were numerous other sorts of berries and fruits as well, including mulberries, huckleberries, blackberries, strawberries, whortleberries, raspberries, roseberries, gooseberries, wintergreen berries, currants, sand hill cherries, red and yellow wild plum, crabapple, paw paw, haw, sassafras, and wild grape.

In addition to corn, early gardens in the area contained beans, peas, squash, tobacco, and melons. Quite often, several varieties of herbs were cultivated for both ceremonial and medicinal use. Both Native American and settler also made maple sugar or syrup from the sap of the sugar maples in the area. The combination of woodland, marsh, and prairie proved very conducive to all sorts of wild fowl. Wild turkey, grouse, prairie chicken, quail, and duck were all found in abundance. A few varieties of hops are native to the area. There was wild rice in abundance, and in some of the dry prairies, hay grew remarkably well. According to the Potawatomi, buffalo and elk were native to the region until the winters became increasingly harsh.
