= Porter Town Hall =

- U.S. National Register of Historic Places
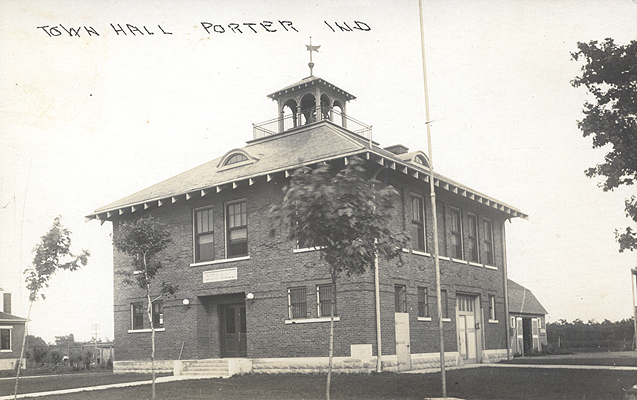
- Porter Town Hall, c. 1915

- Location within Indiana Location within the United States
- Location: 303 Franklin St., Porter, Indiana
- Coordinates: 41°36′59″N 87°4′20″W
- Area: less than one acre
- Built: 1913, 1964
- Architect: Furst, Charles J.; Weber, Alfred P.
- Architectural style: Bungalow/craftsman
- NRHP reference No.: 00000678
- Added to NRHP: June 29, 2000

Porter Town Hall is a historic town hall located at Porter, Indiana. It was built in 1913, and is a two-story, square Bungalow / American Craftsman style red brick building. An addition was built in 1964. It features decorative brick pattern work, exposed rafter ends, eyebrow windows, and a belfry surrounded by a decorative wrought iron railing.

It was listed on the National Register of Historic Places in 2000.
