= Good Fellow Club Youth Camp =

- U.S. National Register of Historic Places
- U.S. Historic district
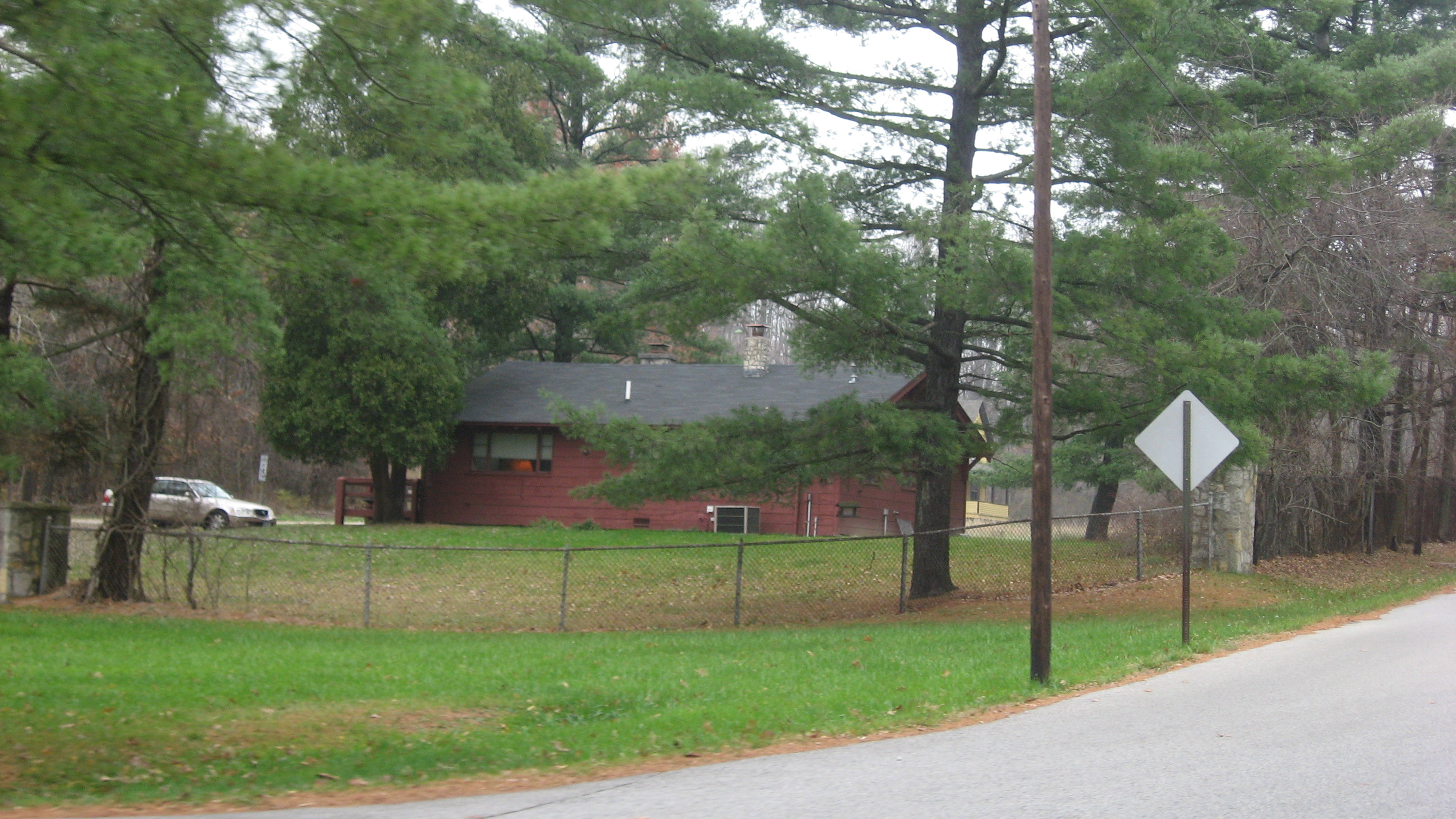
- Good Fellow Club Youth Camp buildings, November 2013

- Location within Indiana Location within the United States
- Location: 303 Franklin St., Porter, Indiana
- Coordinates: 41°37′36″N 87°6′2″W
- Area: 63 acres (25 ha)
- Built: 1941-1976
- Architect: Gaydos, Frank, Krane, Frank; Wanthal, Alvin
- Architectural style: Adirondack rustic
- NRHP reference No.: 13000593
- Added to NRHP: August 8, 2013

Good Fellow Club Youth Camp is a historic summer camp and a national historic district located at Porter, Indiana. The district encompasses nine contributing buildings, seven contributing structures, and one contributing site built by U.S. Steel for its employees' children. The contributing resources include the camp site with roadways and foundations of removed buildings, administration building (lodge, 1941), gate house and flagstone wall (1946), caretaker's house and garage (1941), pool house (1946), steel footbridge, steel swimming pool (1946), riflery (c. 1951), and tennis courts (1946). The buildings reflect the Adirondack rustic and American Craftsman architectural styles. The camp remained in operation until 1976, and is now part of the Indiana Dunes National Park.

It was listed on the National Register of Historic Places in 2013.
