= United Tractor =

American manufacturer of tractors

United Tractor Company
- Industry: Manufacturing
- Founded: 1960
- Founder: George A. Sivore
- Defunct: 2004
- Fate: Dissolved
- Headquarters: Chesterton, Indiana, United States
- Parent: United Boiler Heating and Foundry Company; Indiana Industries, Inc.; American Industries Corporation

United Tractor was an American manufacturer of tractors and aircraft tugs located in Chesterton, Indiana.

== History ==
United Tractor and Material Handling Equipment Company was founded by United States Army Air Force veteran George A. Sivore in Hammond, Indiana in 1960 as a division of the United Boiler Heating and Foundry Company. By 1962, it had become United Tractor, Inc. and that year it moved to Chesterton, Indiana.

The company was sold to American Industries Corporation in 1968, which then changed its name to United Tractor & Equipment Company. The name would be changed again in 1971 to United Tractor Company.

By 1982, it had been purchased by Wedge Products.

In 1988, the company purchased Kalamazoo Manufacturing.

United Tractor signed a deal to build Clark tow tractors in 1995. The agreement also saw the latter's products sold through United distributors.

The company received a grant from the Indiana Department of Commerce in 1997 to improve the energy management system at its factory.

The company moved to Twinsburg, Ohio in 1999. In 2002, it was renamed AJD Tractor, Inc. It was dissolved in 2004.

== Products ==
- CB-40
- G40
- GC-340
- SM40
- SM50
- SM60
- SM340
- SML-80
- SML-100
- SML-120
- TA-75
