= Chesterton station (New York Central Railroad) =

Train station in Chesterton, Indiana

Chesterton
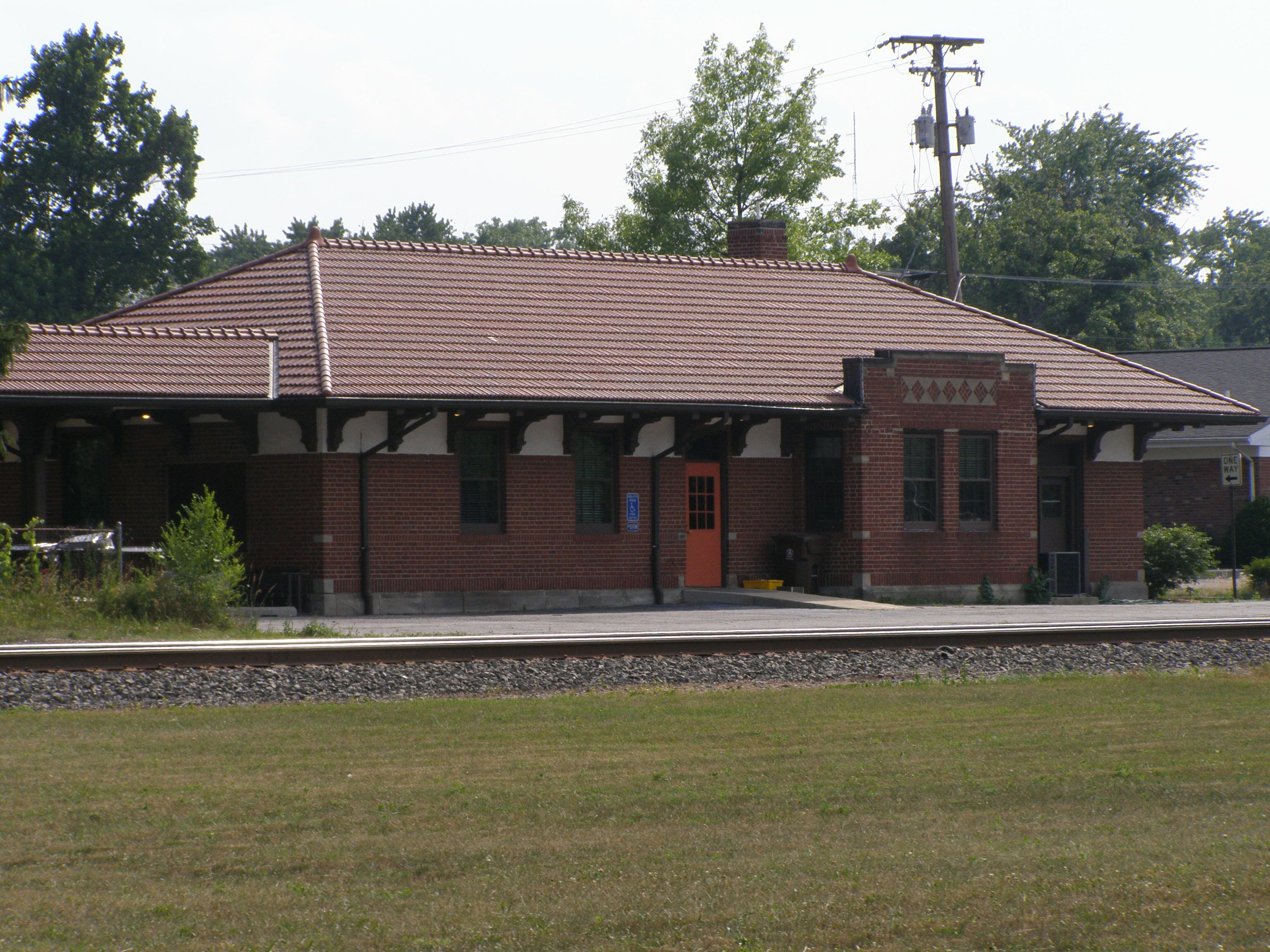
- New York Central Passenger Depot, Chesterton, Indiana (trackside)

General information
- Location: 220 Broadway; Chesterton, Indiana
- Coordinates: 41°36′41″N 87°3′16″W

History
- Opened: 1924
- Closed: 1959

Former services
Preceding station	New York Central Railroad	Following station
Porter toward Chicago	Main Line	Burdick toward New York
Porter toward Chicago	Chesterton Local	Terminus
- New York Central Railroad Passenger Depot
- U.S. National Register of Historic Places
- Location within Indiana Location within the United States
- Location: Chesterton, Indiana
- Coordinates: 41°36′41″N 87°3′16″W
- Area: less than one acre
- Built: 1914
- Built by: Lake Shore and Michigan Southern Railway
- Architectural style: Bungalow/American Craftsman
- NRHP reference No.: 98001103
- Added to NRHP: August 28, 1998
Location

Chesterton is a disused train station in Chesterton, Indiana. The current depot replaced a wooden structure built in 1852 for the Northern Indiana and Chicago Railroad, a predecessor road of the Lake Shore and Michigan Southern Railway, that burned down in 1913. It was rebuilt in 1914 as a brick structure. By 1914, Cornelius Vanderbilt of the New York Central and Hudson River Railroad held a majority interest in the Lake Shore and Michigan Southern Railway. The Southern Railways trackage provided an ideal extension of the New York Central from Buffalo to Chicago. On December 22, 1914, the New York Central and Hudson River Railroad merged with the Lake Shore and Michigan Southern Railway to form a new New York Central Railroad.

The New York Central Railroad, built the new Chesterton Depot out of brick and to the west, across Fourth Street, they built a freight house that same year.

In 1968, the New York Central merged with the Pennsylvania Railroad. In 1976, the Penn Central's freight service was consolidated into Conrail and it ended passenger service altogether. Passenger service to Chesterton ended in 1959. The rail lines are currently operated by Norfolk Southern.

== Architecture ==
The Passenger Depot is identified in the National Register as Bungalow/American Craftsman style, whereas the Indiana State Historic Office (SHP) and Historic Landmarks Foundation of Indiana identify the structure as Spanish Eclectic The Porter County Interim report also identifies the construction date as 1924. This contradiction with the National Register information may reflect a building upgrade in 1924. The adjacent freight house retains the bungalow/American Craftsman styling, which may be the original (pre-1921) style of the passenger depot.

According to the Indiana Office of Historic Preservation, attributes of the bungalow/American Craftsmap style are simple form, usually low side gable roof, large porch, heavy brick piers or square tapered wood posts, overhanging eaves with simple knee braces, low pitched roof, natural materials, wood siding, brick, stucco, cobblestone. Attributes of Spanish Eclectic style are clay tile roofs, little or no overhanging eaves, stucco walls, arches, especially above doors, porch entries or primary windows, elaborate entryways, decorative ironwork.

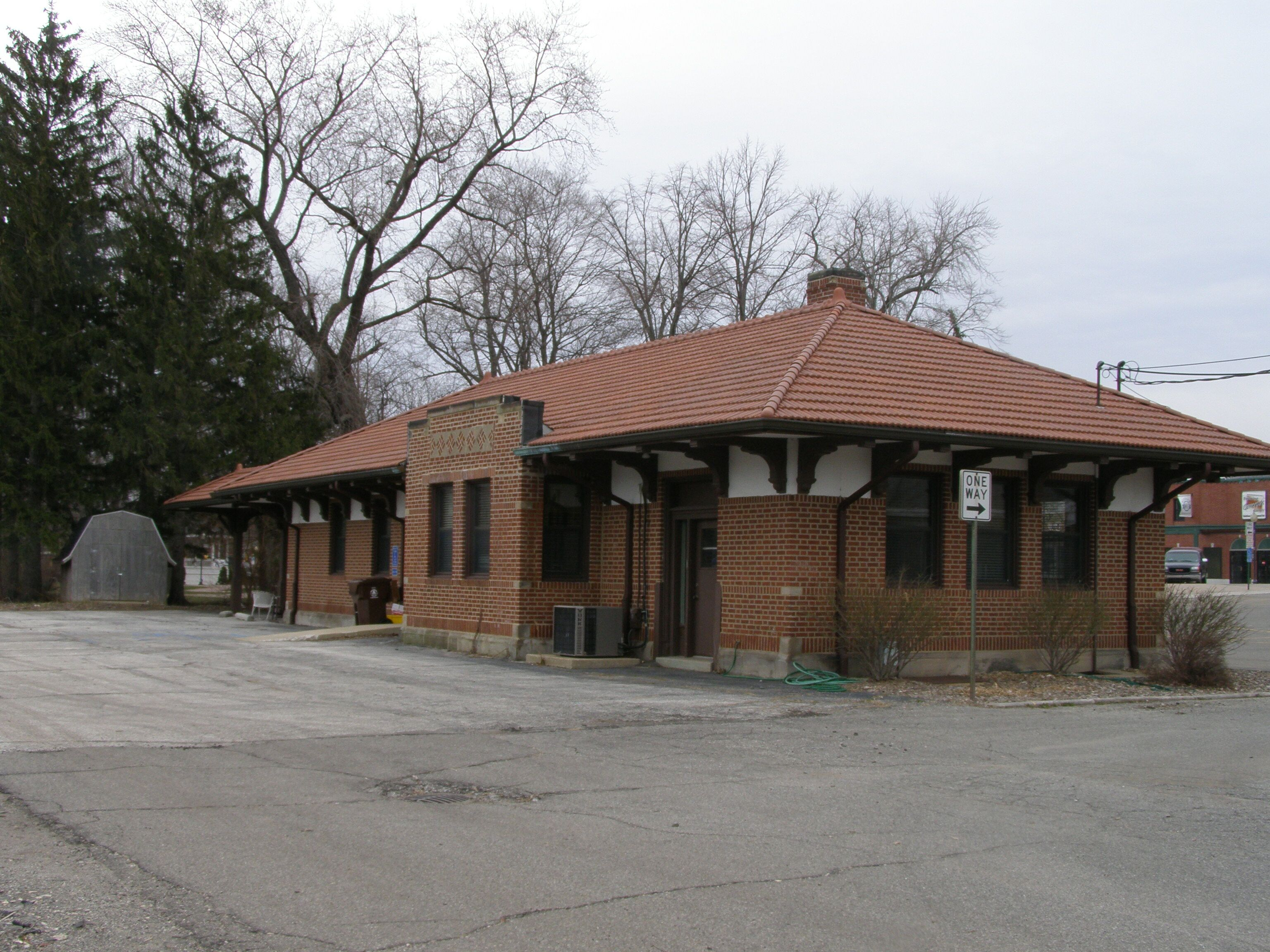
New York Central Passenger Depot, Chesterton, Indiana (trackside)

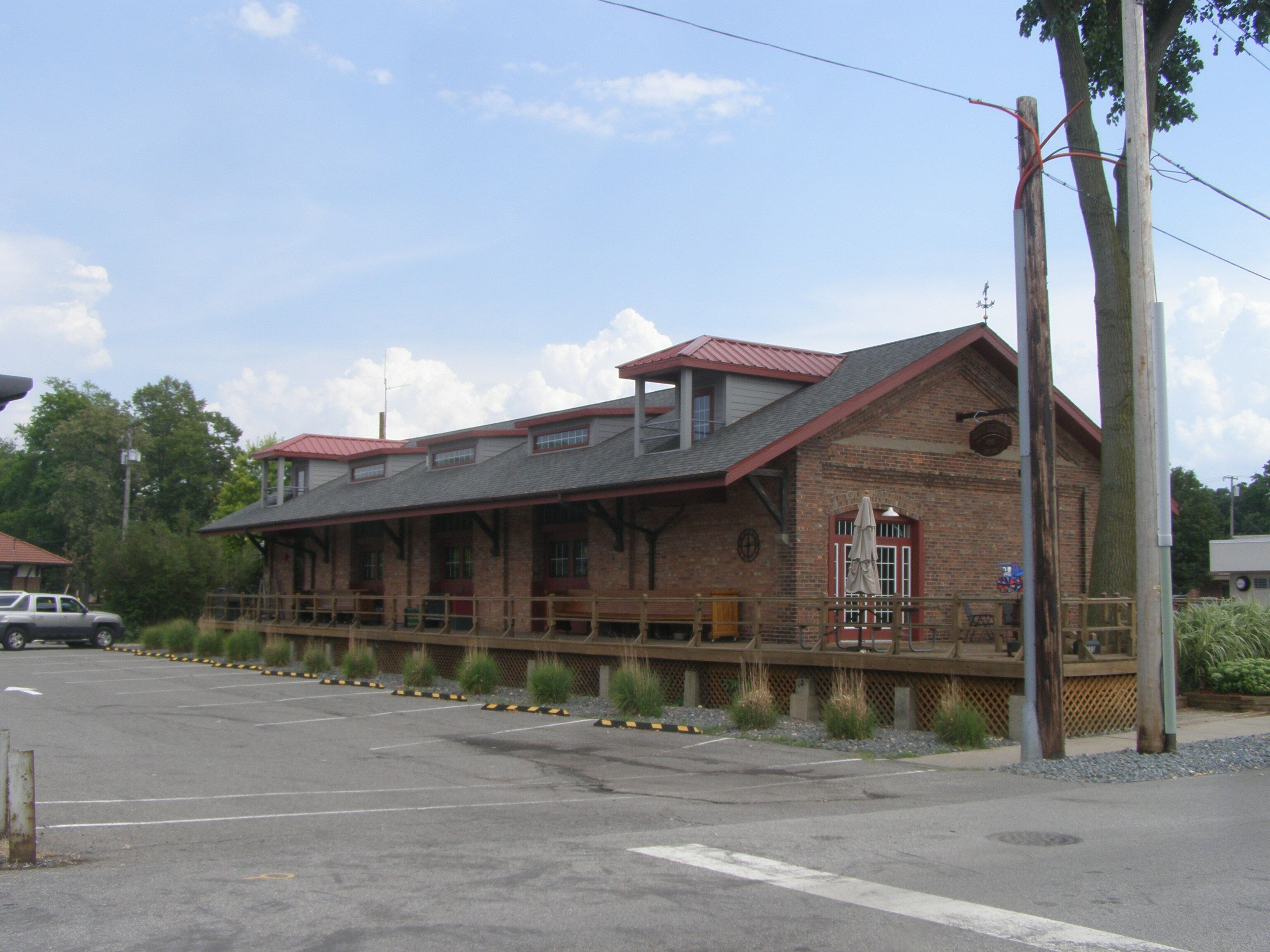
New York Central Freight Depot, Chesterton, Indiana (trackside)

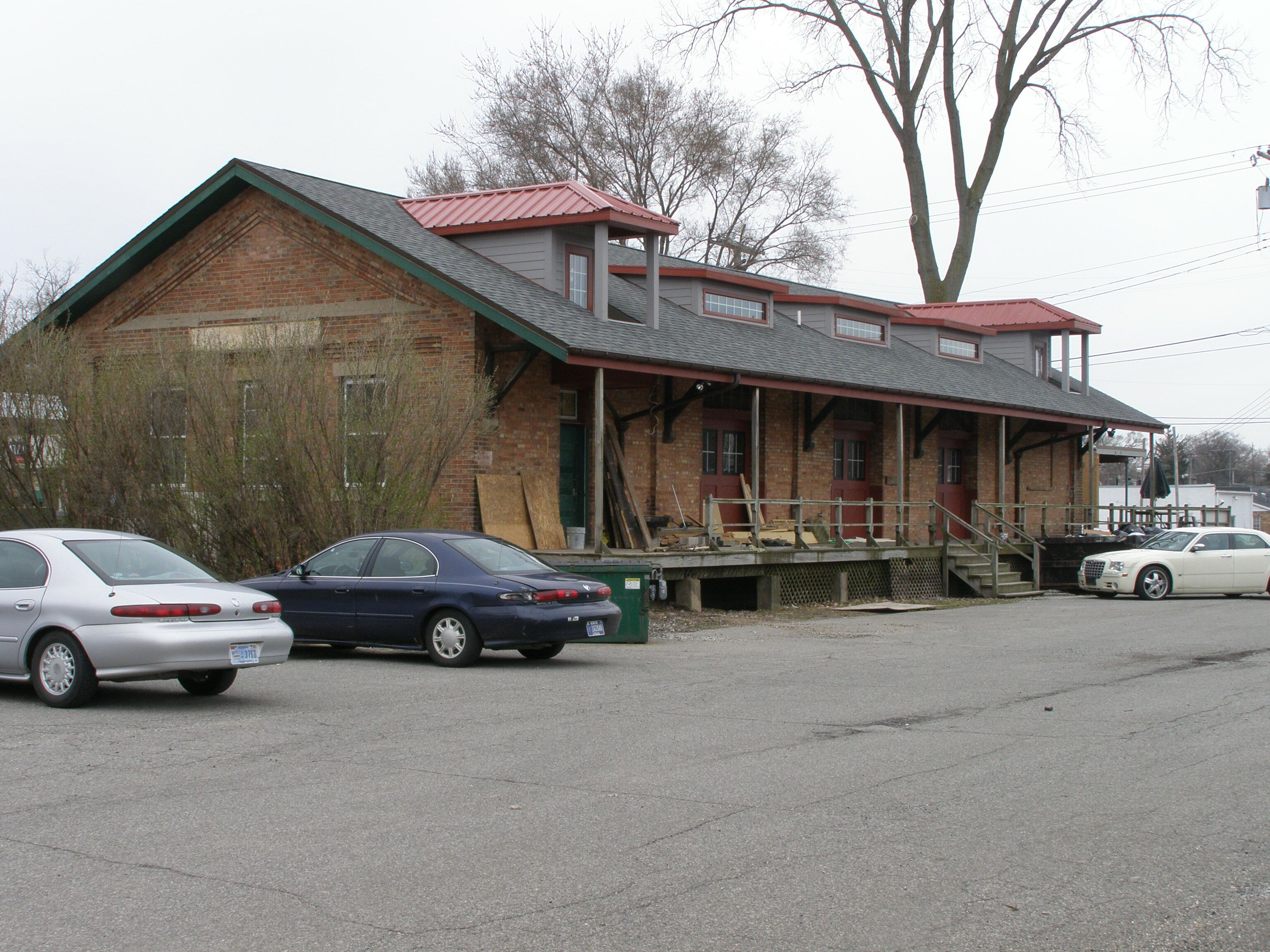
New York Central Freight Depot, Chesterton, Indiana

== National Register of Historic Sites ==
- Chesterton Commercial Historic District
- Chesterton Residential Historic District
- George Brown Mansion
- Norris and Harriet Coambs Lustron House
- New York Central Railroad Passenger Depot, Chesterton, Indiana
- Martin Young House
