= Chellberg Farm =

Historic farmstead in Indiana, US

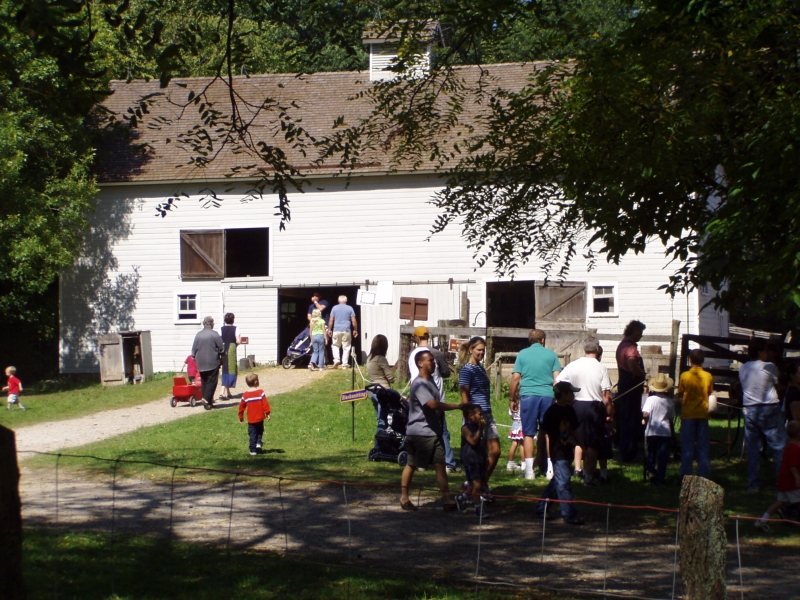
Chellberg Barn

Chellberg Farm (sometimes Anders Kjellberg Farm) is a historic farmstead which in 1972 became part of Indiana Dunes National Park. Chellberg Farm is significant as it represents the ethnic heritage of a nearly forgotten Swedish-American settlement. The farm includes a family home, water house with windmill, chicken coop/bunkhouse, and the original barn. Other nearby Swedish landmarks have been restored or preserved, including the Burstrom Chapel and the Burstrom Cemetery.

== Swedish Community ==
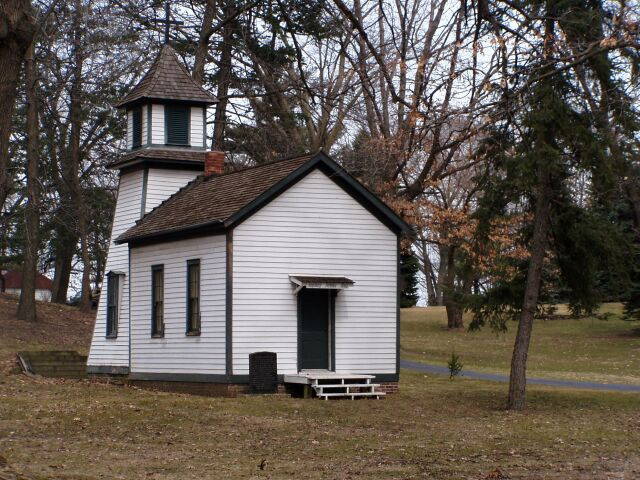
The early Swedish Lutheran Church and later the Skola, School

Swedish immigrants located in Baillytown, in Porter County, Indiana, for several reasons, one being that there were new jobs available, another because like most immigrants, they sought out others like themselves. Baillytown's proximity to Chicago connected it to the larger paths of Swedish immigration from the 1840s to the 1920s. The railroad came to the region in the 1850s and it provided for settlement and the transport of lumber from the lakeshore. A local story has it that an earlier Swedish immigrant, Jonas Asp, aided Joel H. Wicker in recruiting Swedes, including the Kjellberg family to work his lands. These settlers then encouraged friends and families to join them. The immigrants provided the necessary labor force for developing farmland, railroads, and industry in the area. The close-knit Swedish-American community emphasized their cultural heritage, teaching their children Swedish, establishing Swedish churches, and participating in social events where Swedish traditions were observed.

== Architecture ==
=== The Farmhouse ===
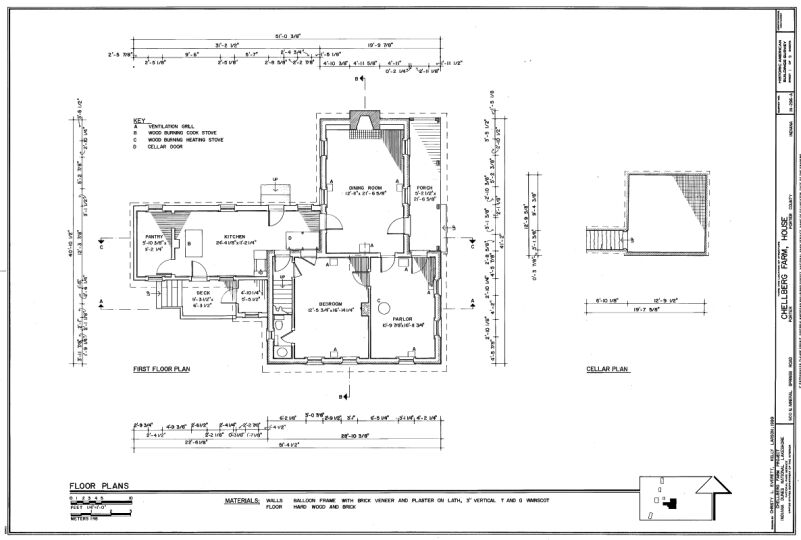

Built in 1885, the house is considered folk Victorian. This was a common style across the United States at the end of the 19th century. The original structures was built on the 'T-shaped plan'. A two-story gable abutted a one-story wing. This created a location for a porch addition in the L between the gabled section and the wing. There may have been a second porch on the west side before the '1901' kitchen addition was added. Unlike many houses of this time, ornamentation was restrained. The house included a parlor, plenty of bedrooms and the kitchen. Overtime, a craftsman fireplace was added in the dining room and later a glass-enclosed front porch. The glass enclosure was removed during rehabilitation.

Like many structures in this area, local labor and local materials were put to good use. The clay soils were turned into a thriving brick industry. the red brick facade is made of porter brick.

=== The Barn ===
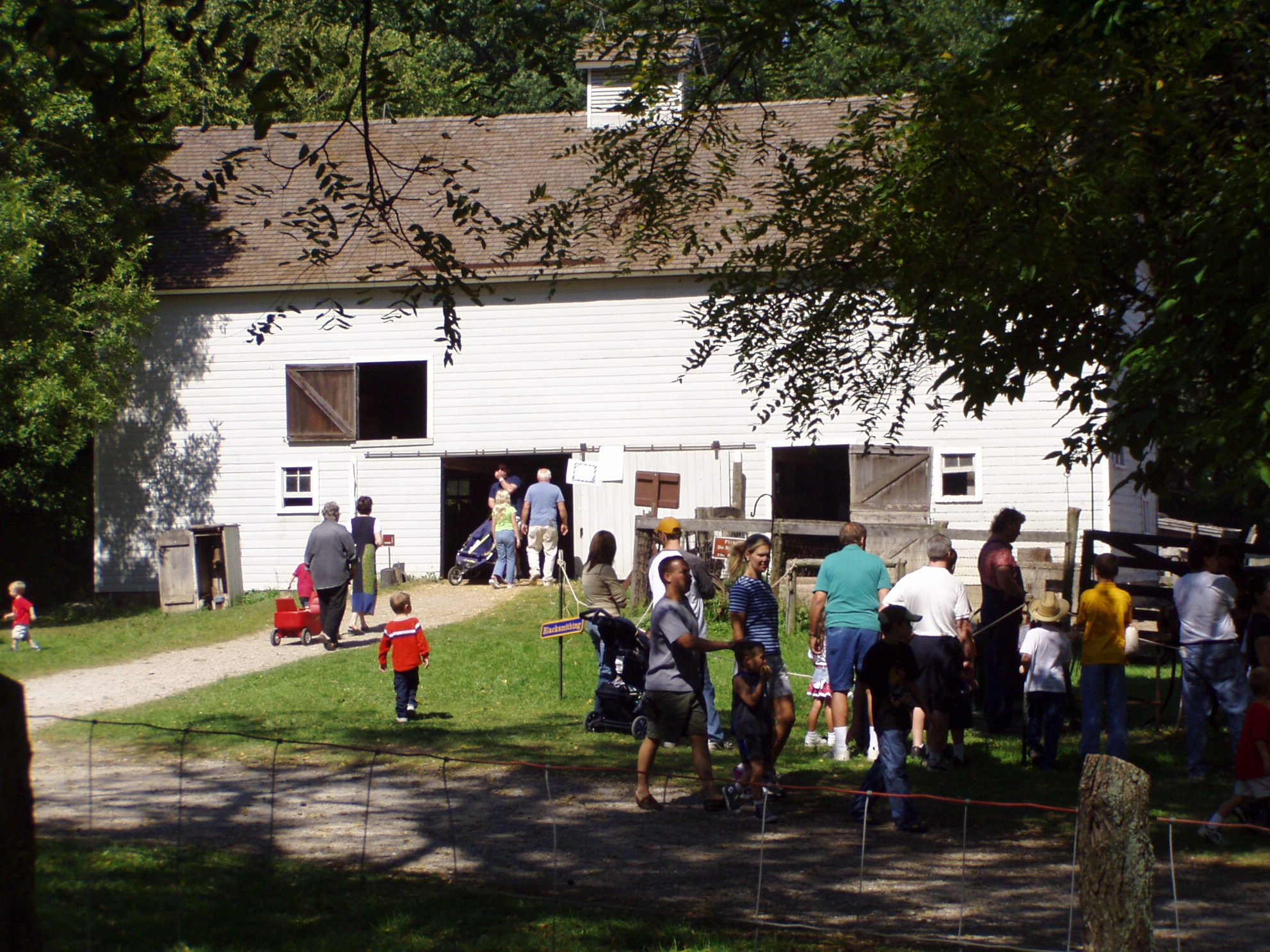

Built over 130 years ago, the barn remains intact. Like its neighbors, the Chellberg barn is located north of the main house. It was built between 1870 and 1879, using a design common for that time. The 1880 census showed the Chellbergs having 'two milk cows, six other cattle, two sheep and five horses.' Over the years, the use of the barn changed and so did its design. By the 1900s, the family was operating a dairy farm. It is believed that the windows were installed during this period to improve light and ventilation. In 1917, a silo was added to provide for silage.

The barn is a three-bay structure with a gabled roof. It is 50.67 feet (15.44 m) by 24.25 feet (7.39 m), standing 25 feet (7.6 m) tall. The construction is on four bents built using two 8 inches (20 cm) by 8 inches (20 cm) uprights. Two bents form the east and west ends, with the remaining two bents forming the center bay. The wood consists of a mix of oak, elm, ash, maple and basswood. Originally built on stone piers, Carl Chellberg added a concrete floor in 1938. The barn is located in an east–west alignment to provide maximum sun on the structure. It is also adjacent to the wood ravine, which helps block the winter winds.

=== Corncrib ===
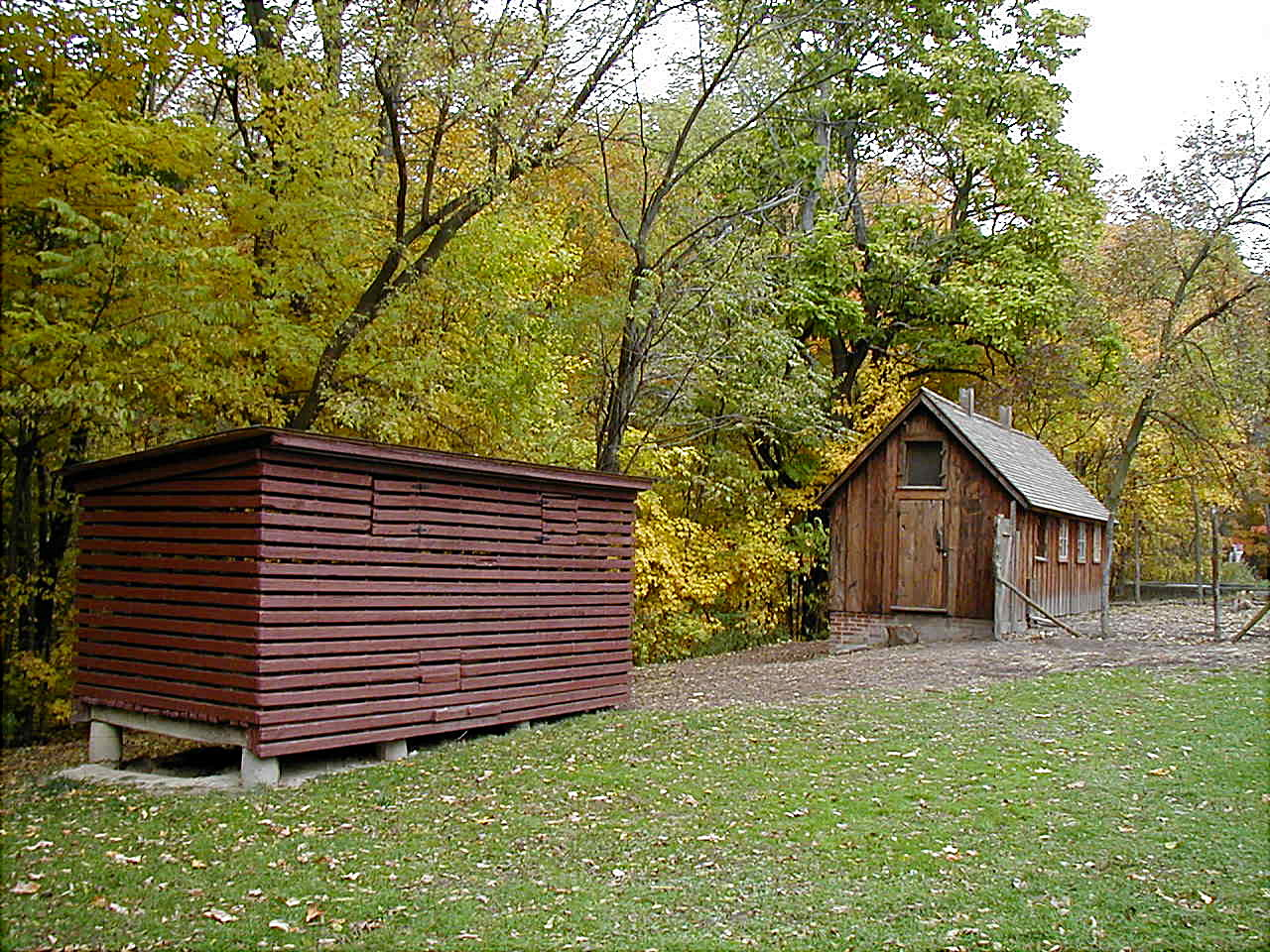
Corncrib and the Chicken Coop

The current corncrib was built in 1941, designed and built by Carl Chellberg. Over the years the Chellbergs had several different types of corncribs. Originally the farm had a drive-through corncrib, which gave way to the silo during the dairy farm period. The current crib is a single storage structure located just north of the house. The orientation is north and south apparently to conform to the property limited space. The existing structure is built on concrete piles to repel rodents. Large squared timber beams are placed atop these posts and then floored using tongue and groove flooring, which was taken from the silo. In the silo, the flooring ran up and down the structure. For this structure, the boards were split in half and cut to the necessary length and laid horizontally. At a later date, a wire mesh was placed on the inside of the walls for better protection from pests.

The south wall of the shed was shared with a tractor shed, which is now gone. The tractor shed housed the Chellbergs' 1939 Allis-Chalmers tractor. Once the tractor arrived, it was used instead of the horses for the harvest.

=== Granary ===
A two-story, wood-framed building, just west of the farmhouse.

=== Maple sugar Camp ===
The sugar Shack, built in the 1930s as a utilitarian structure of one-story made from concrete block, was built for processing sugar maple sap into maple syrup. The single room is 12'x24' with a gable roof over the concrete floor. Double vertical board doors, standing seam metal gable roof cover the structure. The building has a boiling pan over a brick fire box. This is connected to the brick chimney. The roof includes gabled ridge vent with hopper panel vent, and metal ball finials. A small shed addition was added to east. The camp is still in use each spring.

Historic American Buildings Survey Gallery

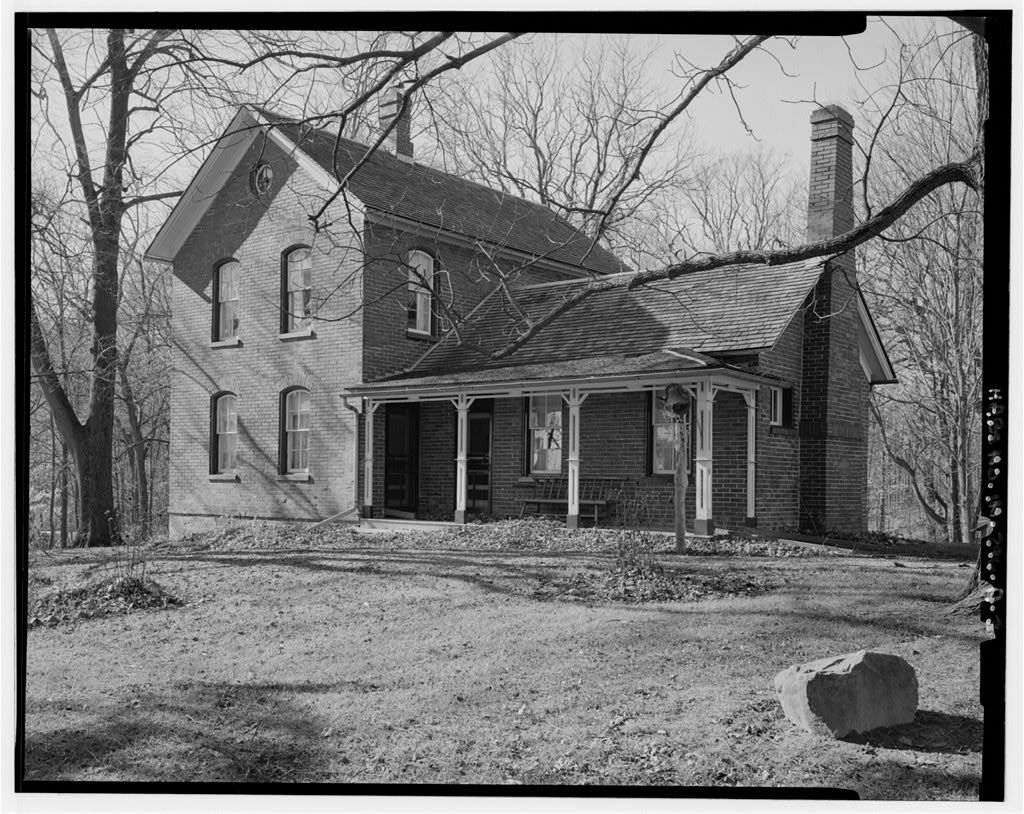
Chellberg Farmhouse (1885)

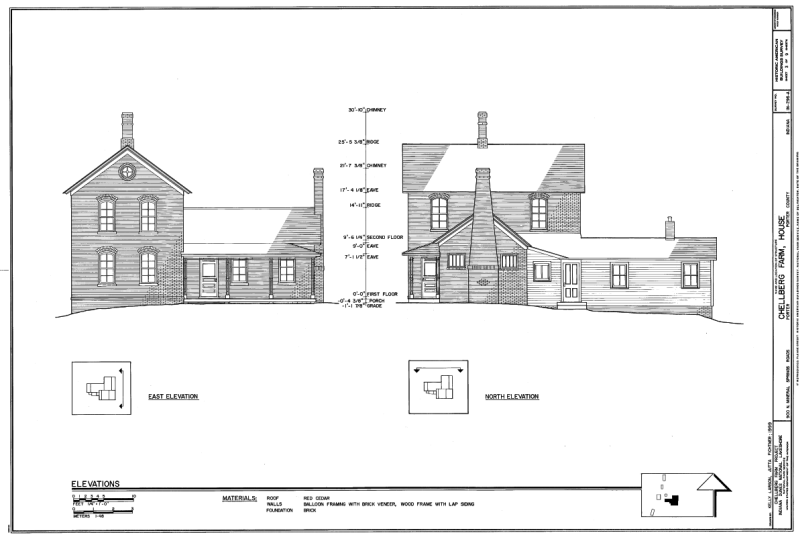
Elevations

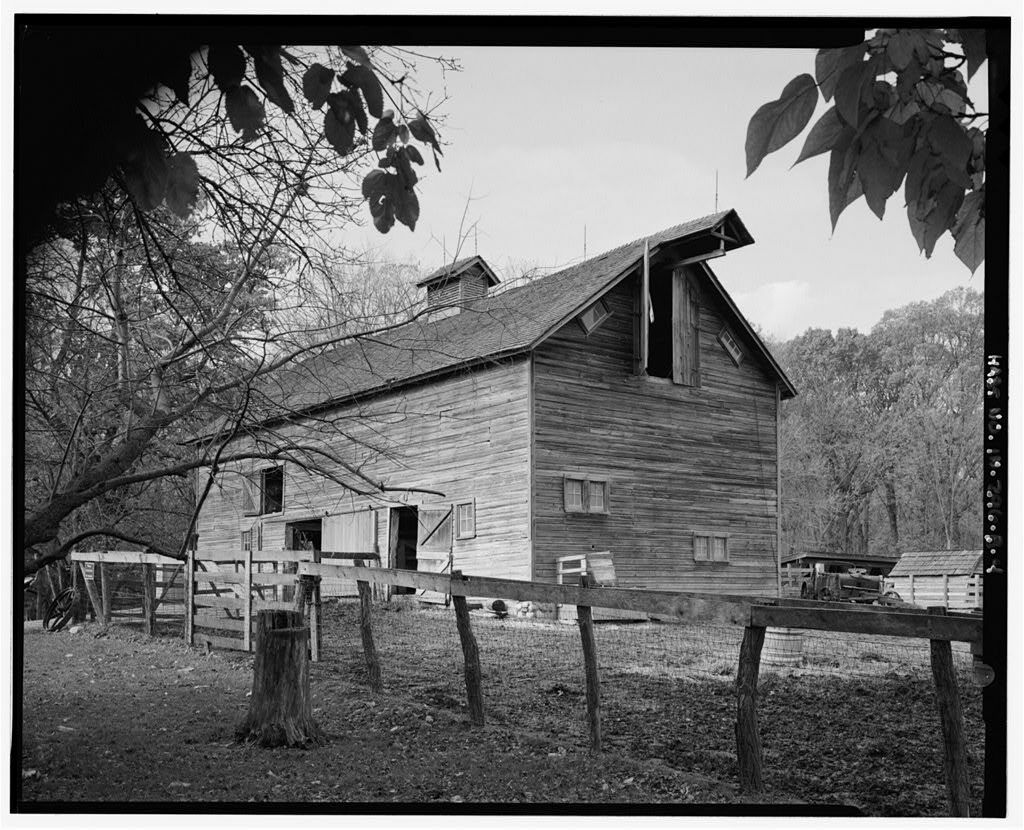
Original Barn (1900)

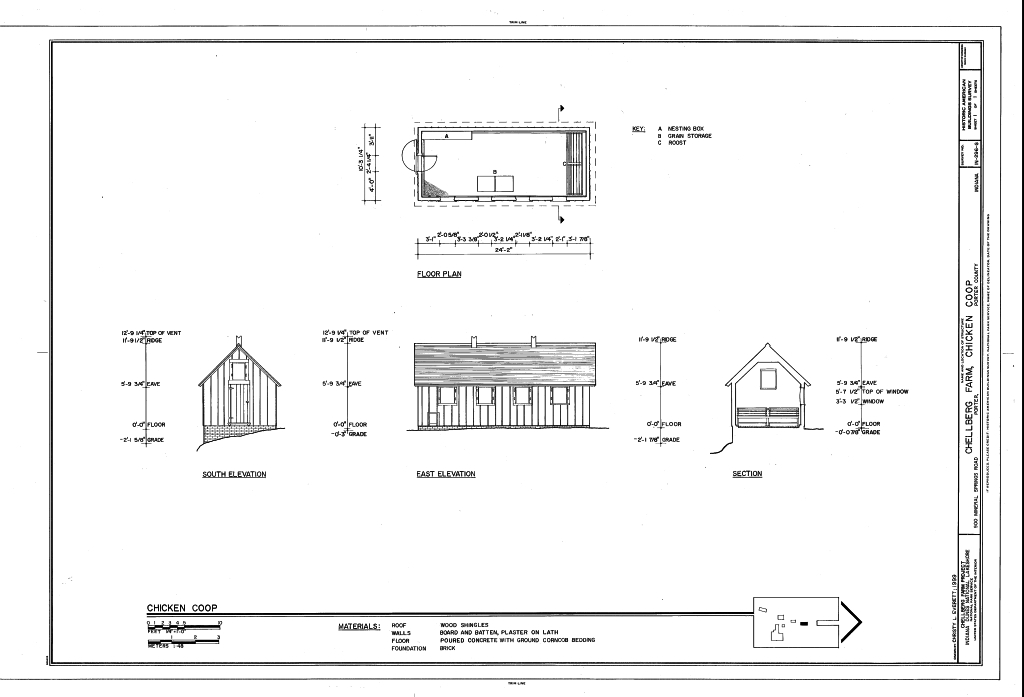
Chicken Coop, previously the hired help quarters

=== Chicken Coop ===
This one-story, single-room structure was built ca 1879. It has a gable roof of wood shingles. It is 10'x24', on a brick foundation. The siding is vertical board and batten. Interior walls have been plastered.

== The Family ==
The Kjellberg Arrival in America
Anders Ludwig Kjellberg (born March 22, 1830) and Johanna (Anderson) Kjellberg (born April 28, 1829) were married in Sweden in the 1850s. They emigrated to the U.S. in 1863 with their son, Carl (born 1859). Family tradition says that they immediately moved to the Bailly area. They did not set up a home on the current location. They first lived on Mineral Springs road, south of the tracks from the Swedish Lutheran Church.

The 1871 Great Chicago Fire destroyed much of the Swedish community in Chicago. Many Swedish residents choose to move to the Swedish community of Indiana. A popular story that is the Kjellberg family met Joel Wicker (the son-in-law of Joseph Bailly) while in Chicago and that Joel hired Anders to clean out brush in preparation for planting. Joel is said to have provided a small log house for the family.

Anders Kjellherg had been a tailor and a lay preacher the Lutheran Church in Sweden. He continued to place an emphasis on his religion after immigrating and helped to establish the Swedish Lutheran Church, now the Augsburg Lutheran Church. The Kjellbergs' second child, Carolyn, was born in the mid-1860s. She died at the age of three or four. The family also had a foster son, Simon Larson, who was born in 1874 and joined the family before 1880.

Arrival in Northwest Indiana
In October 1869 the family took legal title to the Chellberg Farm property. On November 1, 1869, the Kjellberg (Chellberg) family took possession of what is known as the Chellberg Farm. John Oherg and Anders Kjellberg represented the family in the purchase of 80 acres (32 ha) from J. H. Wicker. It cost $12.00 per acre. They also paid off an older contract of Wicker's worth $1000.

There were no structures on the land, nor was it cleared for agricultural use. The 1870 Population and Agricultural Census. The family of four living on the property with only 4 acres (1.6 ha) of improved land. No crops had been produced in their first year, but they had several animals, two milk cows, two other cattle and two swine. Their only farm production and possibly only source of income was 100 pounds of butter that had been produced. Meanwhile, John Oberg's farm also had 4 acres (1.6 ha) improved and a higher production level, 10 bushels of Spring wheat, 25 bushels of Winter wheat and 1 bushel of Irish potatoes. The Obergs owned one swine, two milk cows and had produced 150 pounds of butter. There appears to be some confusion over whether the Chellbergs were actually on the 'farm site' or if it was the Obergs who were residents at the time of the census.

Clearing the land would have been a slow process. In a good year, they might be able to clear only 15 acres (6.1 ha) per year. It is more likely that they only cleared 5 acres (2.0 ha) to 10 acres (4.0 ha) a year. Clearing the land would produce sell-able lumber and cordwood, i.e., firewood. Most farms in the area were small and did a little of everything. The Chellbergs had an orchard which may have produced apples, pears, peaches, plums, cherries, grapes, strawberries, and raspberries.

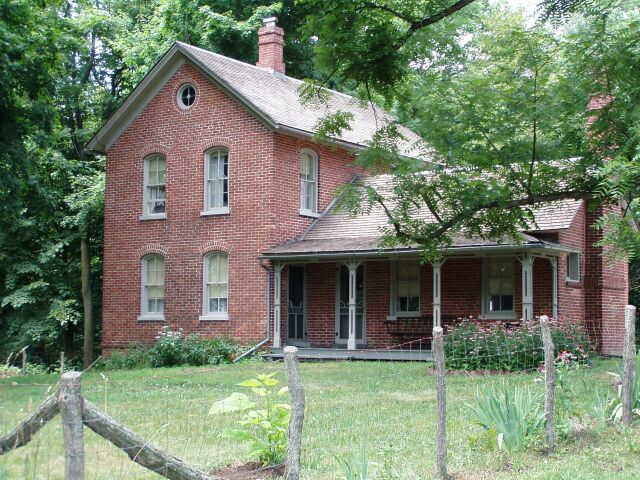
The 1885 Brick House on the Chellberg Farm

On April 4, 1872 Anders Kjellberg purchased an additional 40 acres (16 ha), the northern half of the property, from Joel H. Wicker. The house (prior to the current brick house) and the barn had been built between 1869 and 1872 when this additional land was obtained. It is assumed that the well and outhouse also built early for use by the family. By 1879 the farm included thirty poultry, eight cows, two sheep, eleven swine, and five horses. A chicken house was probably constructed between before 1879. Evidence also indicates that a corncrib may have been built prior to 1879. That year, the farm produced 100 bushels of Indian corn, from the 40 acres (16 ha) cultivated. 9 acres (3.6 ha) of Indian corn produced 100 bushels. 3 acres (1.2 ha) of oats produced another forty bushels and 1-acre (0.40 ha) of rye produced fifteen bushels. One hundred and twenty-two bushels of wheat came from 9 acres (3.6 ha). Hay is measured in tons, and five tons were harvested from 5 acres (2.0 ha). An area of 1-acre (0.40 ha) was planted in Irish potatoes, which produced 75 bushels.

The construction of the brick farmhouse in 1885 was a major addition to the farm. For many families the construction of a new, larger house would have indicated an improved level of prosperity, however, the Chellberg farmhouse was constructed as a direct result of the disastrous fire that consumed the original family home. The use of brick for the new house was more likely to be an attempt to guarantee that another fire would not threaten the family, than a display of a new level of wealth

Second Generation at the Chellberg Farm, 1893–1908

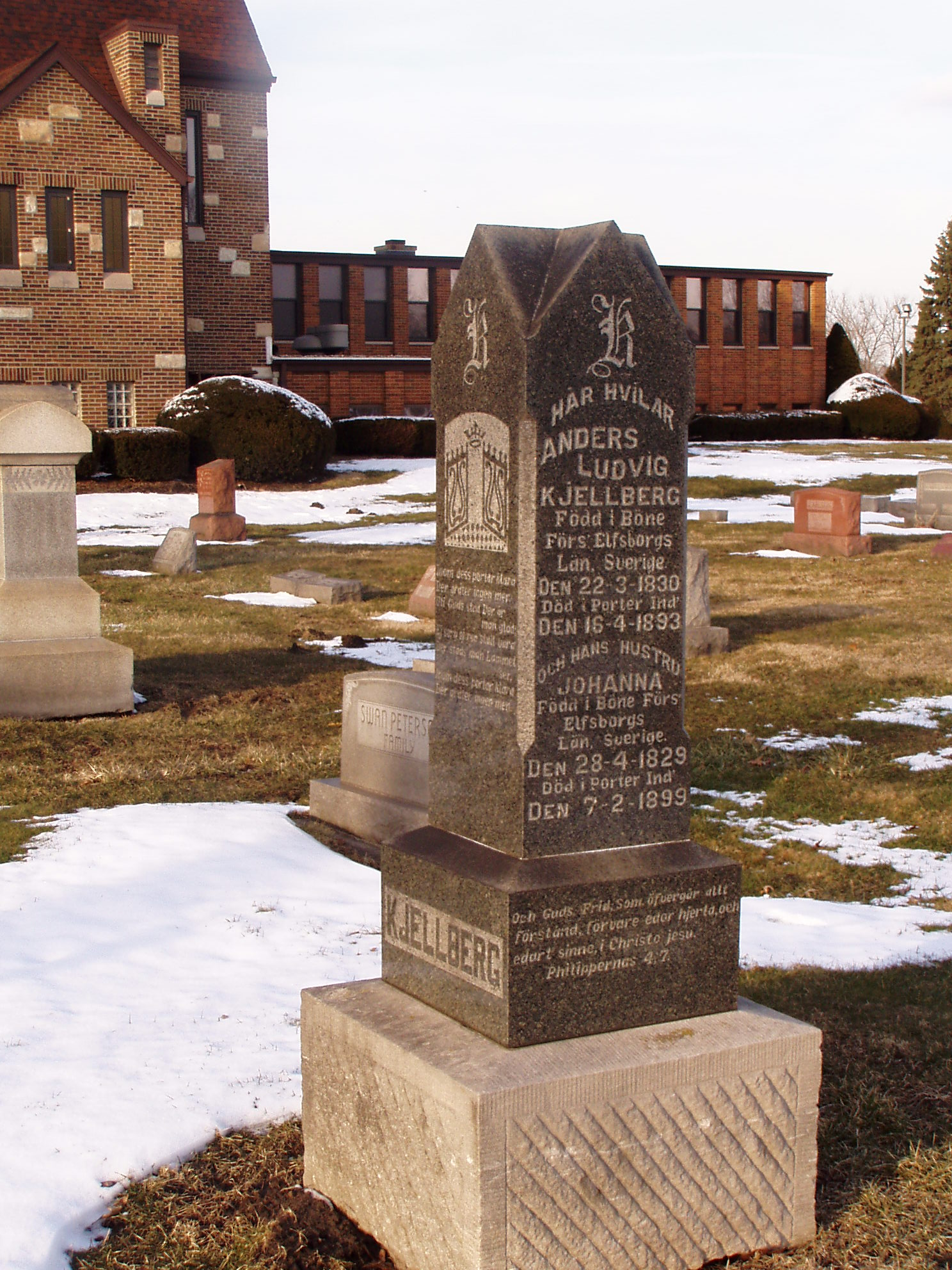
Gravestone of Anders and Johanna Kjellberg

Anders Kjellberg was 63 when he died on April 16, 1893. His son, C.L. Chellberg became the owner of the farm when he bought his mother's and sister's inherited interest. C. L. paid $3500 to the two and agreed to shelter and feed them for the rest of their lives. C. L. took a more scientific approach to farming. He read The Farm Journal for a year, considered alternative approaches to farming and courted Ottomina Peterson. His scientific approach was furthered, beginning in 1896 when he subscribed to the U.S. Department of Agriculture Farmer's Bulletins.

It is likely that C.L. Chellberg was in the process of developing the herd in 1901. After Emily Kjellberg married Alfred Borg in 1897, she and Alfred continued to live at the farm with their two children until 1901. Alfred was a carpenter and brick worker by trade so; he may have provided cash income by working off of the farm. In 1899 Johanna Kjellberg died at the age of 70. C.L. Chellberg and Emily and Alfred Borg continued to live in the farmhouse together until C.L. married Ottomina in 1901. Then, Emily and Alfred, with their children moved away. They lived with other relatives until ca. 1904 their home, Oak Hill Road and a ravine from the farm was completed.

Chellberg Dairy Farm, 1908–1937
By 1908 the Chellbergs had switched from grain production to dairy and grain farm. The Chicago, South Bend and South Shore Railroad had been completed and a stop was only a mile away. With the daily train, they could sell milk to the dairy in East Chicago. Over the following years, the children of C.L. and Ottomina (Naomi and Carl) and their children continued to work on the farm. Naomi (1907–1988), moved away from the farm only after her marriage to Alden Studebaker in 1926. Even the grand children, Ann Chellberg Medley, daughter of Carl and Hilda Chellberg and Henry Studebaker and Arthur Studebaker, sons of Naomi Chellberg Studebaker and Alden Studebaker spent much of their childhood on the farm. Somewhere between 1920 and the 1930s, the dairy operation. It may have been when the South Shore closed its stop near farm or slowly over time as it became more difficult to get the milk to the train each day.

Third Generation at the Chellberg Farm, 1937–1972

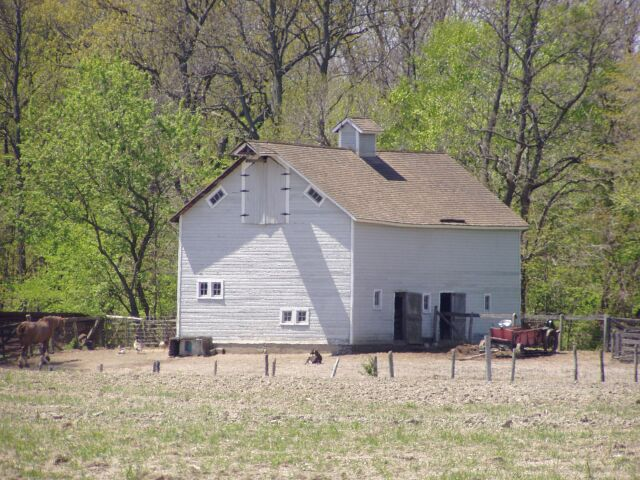
Old barn on the Chellberg Farm

C.L. Chellberg died in 1937. The farm was between his spouse and three children. His son Carl Chellberg took on the primary management of the farm, but everyone was actively involved in the decisions. They did not keep up with the changing economy as industry replaced farming as the mainstay of commerce. Like many farmers today (2008), he worked in town to make ends meet. Carl found employment in a machine shop in Chesterton.

In 1938 Carl married Hilda Johnson. They had two children. The remodeled second floor of the farmhouse was an apartment where they and children lived. Minnie Chellberg died on November 15, 1952, at the age of 82. Minnie managed the house gardens, both the vegetable garden and the flowers in the front yard. She also oversaw the orchard. She also continued to raise chickens.

Sometime in the 1940s Carl Chellberg began raising sheep and kept about 60 head. The sheep were sold at auctions for meat. The sheep grazed throughout the entire farm property and were kept in two sheep sheds that were constructed during this period. A large extension was built onto the south side of the barn in 1954. It was constructed by Carl Chellberg, Henry Studebaker, and Arthur Studebaker. Another sheep shed was constructed behind the granary. The building was smaller than the barn addition and constructed of corrugated iron. Eventually (sometime in the mid to late 1950s) Carl Chellberg took a job a machine shop in Chesterton and sold the sheep. Hilda Johnson Chellberg worked as a cook at a local restaurant. Once both Carl and Hilda had jobs off of the farm, the farm operation became a secondary effort and no longer the main family business."

Circa 1940 electricity was reestablished at the farm. It was used until the utility company power was brought to the farm in the 1940s after the war. During 1943, 1944, and 1945, Henry and Arthur Studebaker grew vegetables at the farm for sale to local residents. They had a 2-acre (0.81 ha) garden in the eastern portion of the field south of the orchard and north of the current visitor center parking lot. They grew vegetables to sell door to door in Dune Acres. They grew asparagus, lima beans, yellow and green snap beans, beets, broccoli, cabbage, carrots, cauliflower, celery (white), kale, leaf lettuce, endive, cantaloupe, watermelons, okra, green onions, leeks, parsnips, peas, green and red peppers, red, white, and sweet potatoes, radishes, rhubarb, spinach, red rhubarb chard and white Swiss chard, Jerusalem and butternut squash, red and yellow tomatoes, turnips, rutabagas, kohl robi, cicely, sweet corn (yellow bantam and country gentleman), horseradish, dill, sage, chives, and parsley.

== Nearby Swedish landmarks ==
Other nearby Swedish landmarks have been restored or preserved, including the Burstrom Chapel and the Burstrom Cemetery.

== See also ==
- Indiana Dunes National Park
- Swedish American
- Swedish emigration to the United States
- Swedish Farmsteads of Porter County, Indiana
