= Chesterton, Indiana =

- Town
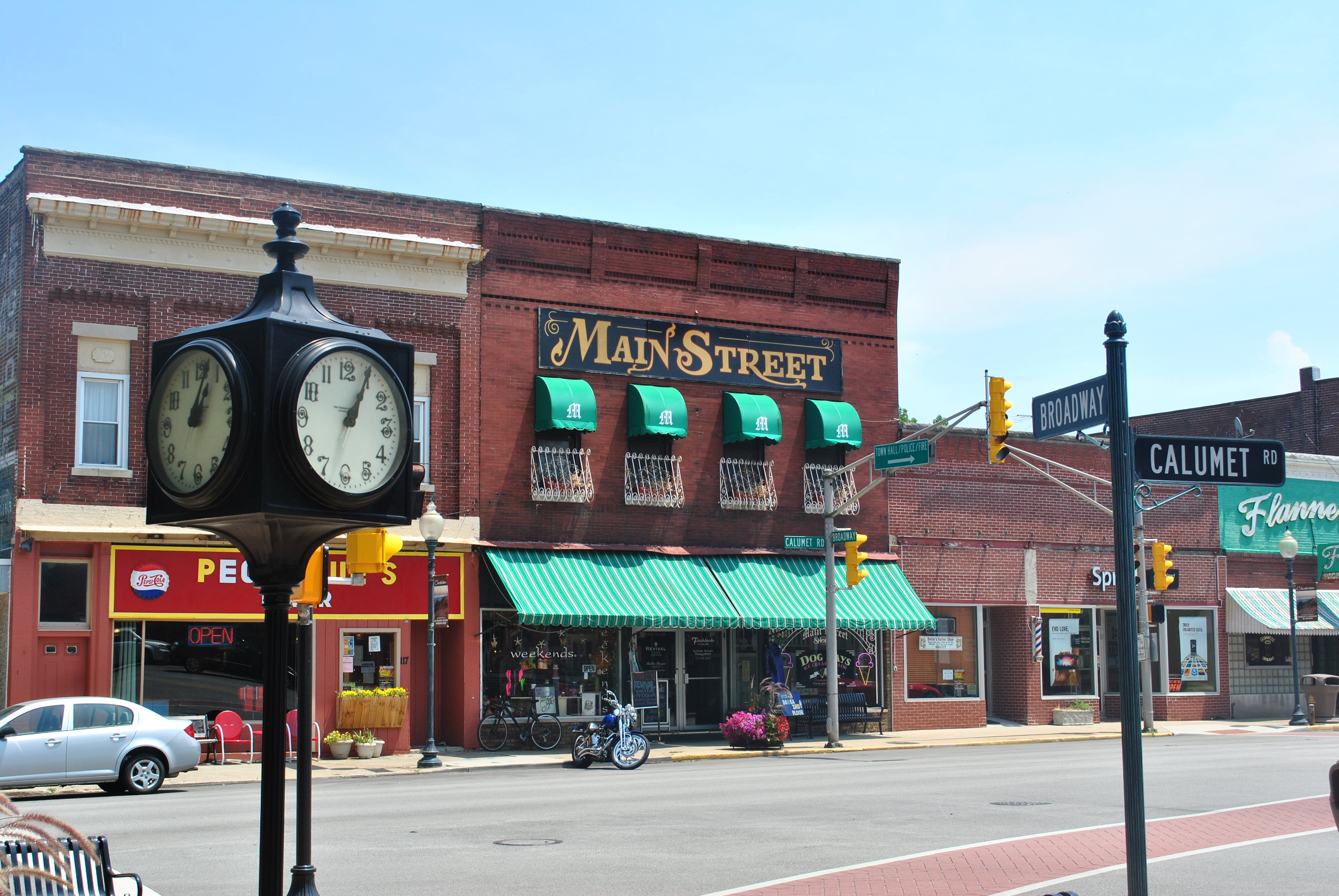
- Calumet Ave, Downtown

- Logo

- Location of Chesterton in Porter County, Indiana.
- Coordinates: 41°36′38″N 87°03′51″W
- Country: United States
- State: Indiana
- County: Porter
- Townships: Westchester, Jackson, Liberty, Pine
- Settled: 1833
- Platted: 1852
- Incorporated (town): May 4, 1899

Government
  - Type: Town Council
  - President: Sharon Darnell (D, 4th)
  - Council members: James G. Ton(R, 1st); Erin Collins (D, 2nd); Dane Lafata (D, 3rd); Jennifer Fisher (R, 5th)
  - Clerk-Treasurer: Courtney Udvare (D)

Area
  - Total: 9.49 sq mi (24.59 km^{2})
  - Land: 9.38 sq mi (24.30 km^{2})
  - Water: 0.11 sq mi (0.29 km^{2})
- Elevation: 643 ft (196 m)

Population (2020)
  - Total: 14,241
  - Density: 1,518.0/sq mi (586.09/km^{2})
- Time zone: UTC-6 (CST)
  - Summer (DST): UTC-5 (CDT)
- ZIP code: 46304
- Area code: 219
- FIPS code: 18-12412
- GNIS feature ID: 2396642
- Website: www.chestertonin.org

Chesterton is a town in Westchester, Jackson and Liberty Townships in Porter County, in the U.S. state of Indiana. Its population was 14,242 at the 2020 Census. The three towns of Chesterton, Burns Harbor, and Porter are known as the Duneland area.

== Etymology ==
The name Chesterton comes from its township, with Chester deriving from Westchester and the -ton suffix denoting it as a town.

== History ==
Chesterton was first settled under the name Coffee Creek in 1833, with its post office being established in 1835. The post office eventually was renamed to Calumet in 1850, as which the town was platted when the railroad was extended to that point in 1852. Due to a town on the same railroad also being named Calumet, the name finally was changed to Chesterton in 1870 and it was reincorporated as a town in 1899 after a failed incorporation in 1869, with its population of 788 being the second-largest in Porter County at the time.

In 1933, a United Airlines NC13304 flight became the first known, proven case of sabotage in an aircraft. It was downed by a nitroglycerine bomb above Chesterton on October 10, 1933. All seven people aboard the aircraft—four passengers and a crew of three—were killed in the crash.

In 1962, United Tractor moved to the town.

== Geography ==
Just north of the town is Indiana Dunes State Park and Indiana Dunes National Park. Most of the town is flat. However, going south into the city on the Route 49 overpass, one can see the Valparaiso Moraine in the distance.

According to the 2010 census, Chesterton has a total area of 9.44 square miles (24.45 km^{2}), of which 0.11 square miles (0.28 km^{2}) (or 1.17%) is covered by water.

=== Climate ===
Climate data for Chesterton, Indiana (Indiana Dunes State Park) 1991–2020 normals, extremes 1989–present
Month	Jan	Feb	Mar	Apr	May	Jun	Jul	Aug	Sep	Oct	Nov	Dec	Year
Record high °F (°C)	66 (19)	72 (22)	85 (29)	88 (31)	95 (35)	98 (37)	102 (39)	98 (37)	96 (36)	89 (32)	77 (25)	69 (21)	102 (39)
Mean daily maximum °F (°C)	32.1 (0.1)	35.5 (1.9)	45.6 (7.6)	57.2 (14.0)	68.4 (20.2)	77.5 (25.3)	81.6 (27.6)	80.0 (26.7)	74.3 (23.5)	62.3 (16.8)	48.7 (9.3)	37.4 (3.0)	58.4 (14.7)
Daily mean °F (°C)	24.9 (−3.9)	28.3 (−2.1)	37.7 (3.2)	48.4 (9.1)	59.0 (15.0)	68.5 (20.3)	73.0 (22.8)	71.6 (22.0)	65.3 (18.5)	53.5 (11.9)	41.5 (5.3)	30.8 (−0.7)	50.2 (10.1)
Mean daily minimum °F (°C)	17.8 (−7.9)	21.1 (−6.1)	29.8 (−1.2)	39.5 (4.2)	49.6 (9.8)	59.5 (15.3)	64.3 (17.9)	63.1 (17.3)	56.3 (13.5)	44.7 (7.1)	34.2 (1.2)	24.1 (−4.4)	42.0 (5.6)
Record low °F (°C)	−22 (−30)	−15 (−26)	−4 (−20)	18 (−8)	31 (−1)	37 (3)	45 (7)	46 (8)	35 (2)	25 (−4)	9 (−13)	−19 (−28)	−22 (−30)
Average precipitation inches (mm)	2.21 (56)	1.97 (50)	2.34 (59)	3.55 (90)	4.27 (108)	4.31 (109)	3.98 (101)	4.08 (104)	3.65 (93)	3.75 (95)	2.76 (70)	2.29 (58)	39.16 (995)
Average snowfall inches (cm)	16.0 (41)	9.7 (25)	6.0 (15)	0.6 (1.5)	0.0 (0.0)	0.0 (0.0)	0.0 (0.0)	0.0 (0.0)	0.0 (0.0)	0.0 (0.0)	0.7 (1.8)	7.3 (19)	40.3 (102)
Average precipitation days (≥ 0.01 in)	12.6	9.0	10.9	11.3	12.3	11.7	9.7	9.9	9.6	11.5	10.6	11.9	131.0
Average snowy days (≥ 0.1 in)	8.4	5.6	3.4	0.6	0.0	0.0	0.0	0.0	0.0	0.0	1.0	5.7	24.7
Source: NOAA

== Demographics ==
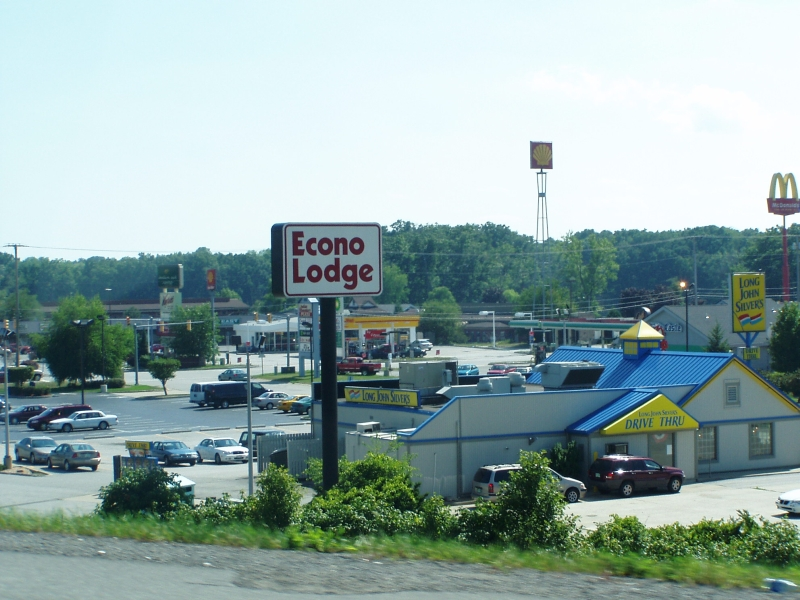
Indian Boundary, where SR 49 and I-94 meet

Historical population
Census	Pop.	Note	%±
1880	488		—
1890	931		90.8%
1900	788		−15.4%
1910	1,400		77.7%
1920	1,604		14.6%
1930	2,231		39.1%
1940	2,470		10.7%
1950	3,175		28.5%
1960	4,335		36.5%
1970	6,177		42.5%
1980	8,531		38.1%
1990	9,124		7.0%
2000	10,488		14.9%
2010	13,068		24.6%
2020	14,241		9.0%
U.S. Decennial Census

=== 2020 census ===
As of the 2020 census, Chesterton had a population of 14,241. The median age was 40.7 years; 23.8% of the residents were under 18 and 17.6% were 65 or older. For every 100 females, there were 95.3 males, and for every 100 females 18 and over, there were 90.8 males 18 and over.

About 98.6% of residents lived in urban areas, while 1.4% lived in rural areas.

Of the 5,671 households in Chesterton, 32.9% had children under 18 living in them, 50.5% were married-couple households, 16.9% were households with a male householder and no spouse or partner present, and 25.2% were households with a female householder and no spouse or partner present. About 26.8% of all households were made up of individuals, and 11.7% had someone living alone who was 65 or older.

The town had 5,992 housing units, of which 5.4% were vacant. The homeowner vacancy rate was 1.0% and the rental vacancy rate was 9.1%.

Racial composition as of the 2020 census
Race	Number	Percentage
White	12,259	86.1%
Black or African American	269	1.9%
American Indian and Alaska Native	27	0.2%
Asian	285	2.0%
Native Hawaiian and other Pacific Islander	0	0.0%
Some other race	228	1.6%
Two or more races	1,173	8.2%
Hispanic or Latino (of any race)	1,287	9.0%

=== 2010 census ===
As of the 2010 census, 13,068 people, 5,029 households, and 3,554 families were living in the town. The population density was 1,400.6 inhabitants per square mile (540.8/km^{2}). The 5,354 housing units had an average density of 573.8 per square mile (221.5/km^{2}). The racial makeup of the town was 92.7% White, 1.4% African American, 0.3% Native American, 2.1% Asian, 1.8% from other races, and 1.7% from two or more races. Hispanics or Latinos of any race were 6.9% of the population.

Of the 5,029 households, 37.3% had children under 18 living with them, 54.1% were married couples living together, 11.8% had a female householder with no husband present, 4.7% had a male householder with no wife present, and 29.3% were not families. About 23.3% of all households were made up of individuals, and 8.2% had someone living alone who was 65 or older. The average household size was 2.58, and the average family size was 3.07.

The median age in the town was 37.8 years; 26.5% of the residents were under 18, 7.1% were 18 to 24, 27.5% were 25 to 44, 27.5% were 45 to 64, and 11.3% were 65 or older. The gender makeup of the town was 48.7% male and 51.3% female.

=== 2000 census ===
As of the census of 2000, 10,488 people, 4,039 households, and 2,879 families were living in the town. The population density was 1,232.0 inhabitants per square mile (475.7/km^{2}). The 4,212 housing units had an average density of 494.8 per square mile (191.0/km^{2}). The racial makeup of the town was 96.29% White, 0.44% African American, 0.21% Native American, 1.37% Asian, 0.02% Pacific Islander, 0.51% from other races, and 1.16% from two or more races. Hispanics or Latinos of any race were 3.31% of the population.

Of the 4,039 households, 36.5% had children under 18 living with them, 57.3% were married couples living together, 9.9% had a female householder with no husband present, and 28.7% were not families. About 23.7% of all households were made up of individuals, and 8.3% had someone living alone who was 65 or older. The average household size was 2.57, and the average family size was 3.06.

In the town, the age distribution was 26.8% under 18, 8.1% from 18 to 24, 29.6% from 25 to 44, 24.8% from 45 to 64, and 10.7% who were 65 or older. The median age was 37 years. For every 100 females, there were 95.6 males. For every 100 females 18 and over, there were 91.3 males.

The median income in the town for a household was $55,530 and for a family was $66,239. Males had a median income of $50,599 versus $28,300 for females. The per capita income for the town was $26,539. About 3.1% of families and 4.3% of the population were below the poverty line, including 6.5% of those under 18 and 4.2% of those 65 or over.

== Education ==
Chesterton High School serves the tritown area. It operates Chesterton's only local radio station, WDSO 88.3.

Two private schools also operate in Chesterton: St. Patrick Catholic Elementary School and Fairhaven Baptist Academy.

Chesterton has five public elementary schools: Liberty, Bailly, Yost, Jackson, and Brummitt. These schools serve student fron kindergarten through grade 4, then those from Jackson and Liberty move to Liberty Intermediate School and those from Bailly, Yost, and Brummitt move to Westchester Intermediate School for grades 5–6. After the grade 6, all students from Liberty and Westchester go to their respective middle schools for grades 7–8, then students move to Chesterton High School for grades 9–12.

The town has a lending library, the Westchester Public Library.

== Media ==
Chesterton has a local newspaper, the Chesterton Tribune, which was first established in 1882 before shortly going out of business and later being restarted in 1884. It had been published daily since 1961 before ceasing operations on December 30, 2020. However, it was purchased by Hometown Media Inc. on March, 10th, 2021, becoming a twice-weekly, full-color paper. The town also is served by Chesterton's high school radio station, WDSO, which provides local news in addition to its regular music programming.

== Transportation ==
The South Shore Line, operated by the Northern Indiana Commuter Transportation District, is headquartered in Chesterton. The line stops north of Chesterton at the Dune Park station with several trains per day to Chicago and South Bend. V-Line's Orange Line route stops near the South Shore station, indirectly connecting Chesterton to Valparaiso University on weekends.

== Culture ==
=== Festivals ===
Chesterton was home to the annual Wizard of Oz Festival, established in 1982, which is the largest and most famous of its kind. In 2006, former organizers Lakeshore Festivals and Events moved the event to the Porter County Expo Center in Valparaiso, Indiana. After 3 years, LFE discontinued the festival and it was brought home to Chesterton by the Duneland Business Initiative Group in 2009, which later rescinded its support of the festival in 2013.

== Notable people ==
- Jim Gaffigan, standup comedian and actor
- Ron Kittle, former Major League Baseball player
- Mitch McGary, former professional basketball player
- Mickey Morandini, former Major League Baseball player
- Zack Novak, former NCAA (University of Michigan) and professional basketball player
- Matt Nover, former professional basketball player and actor
- Blake Pieroni, Gold medalist and current Indiana University swimmer
- Eddie Wineland, professional MMA fighter (bantamweight)
- Taylor Zakhar Perez, actor

== Environmental amenities ==
=== Parkland ===
Chesterton's park system includes several large public parks downtown and sports fields. The town is also served by the Porter County Park District and the nearby Indiana Dunes State Park. Several trails connect Chesterton with Porter and Indiana Dunes National Park (which is connected to Indiana Dunes State Park).

=== Coffee Creek ===
Coffee Creek flows through an area that includes downtown Chesterton. The Coffee Creek Watershed Preserve includes a restored section of the creek and its associated wetland.

== Historic preservation ==
- Chesterton Commercial Historic District
- Chesterton Residential Historic District
- George Brown Mansion
- Norris and Harriet Coambs Lustron House
- New York Central Railroad Passenger Depot, Chesterton, Indiana
- Martin Young House
