= Porter, Indiana =

- Town
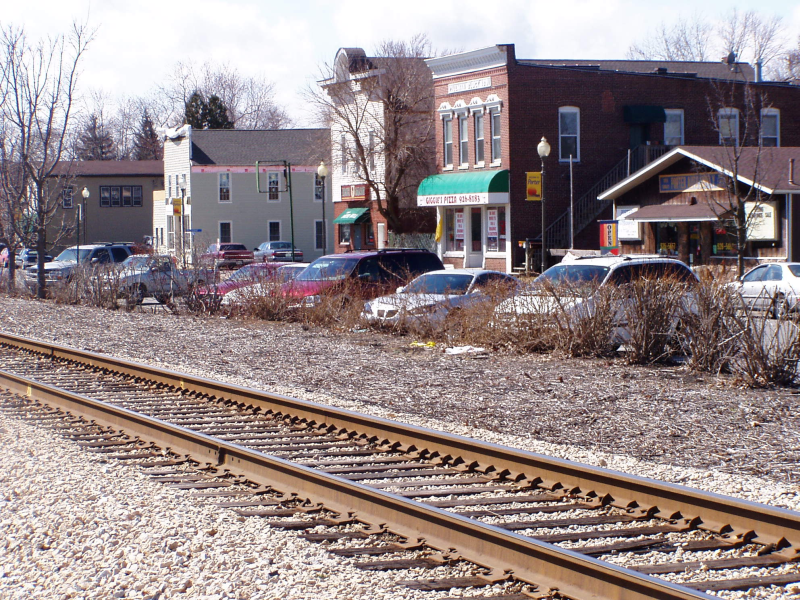
- Lincoln Street in Porter

- Logo

- Location of Porter in Porter County, Indiana.
- Coordinates: 41°37′34″N 87°04′57″W
- Country: United States
- State: Indiana
- County: Porter
- Township: Westchester

Area
  - Total: 6.44 sq mi (16.69 km^{2})
  - Land: 6.16 sq mi (15.96 km^{2})
  - Water: 0.29 sq mi (0.74 km^{2})
- Elevation: 659 ft (201 m)

Population (2020)
  - Total: 5,210
  - Density: 846/sq mi (326.5/km^{2})
- Time zone: UTC-6 (Central (CST))
  - Summer (DST): UTC-5 (CDT)
- ZIP code: 46304, 46369
- Area code: 219
- FIPS code: 18-61164
- GNIS feature ID: 2396863
- Website: www.in.gov/towns/porter/

Porter is a town in Westchester Township, Porter County, in the U.S. state of Indiana. The population was 5,210 as of the 2020 census. Porter is in the Indiana Dunes ecosystem, which played a role in the creation of The Nature Conservancy, and inspired conservation efforts. It is home to Porter Beach, also known as Johnson's Beach, on Lake Michigan.

Porter is located near Indiana Dunes State Park and on the southern railroad terminus of the Chicago and West Michigan Railway.

== History ==
Porter had its start in the 1850s when the railroad was extended to that point.

=== Historic sites ===
The Joseph Bailly Homestead is located in Indiana Dunes National Park on Howe Road, just north of U.S. 20. It is the residence of three generations of the Bailly family. Joseph and Marie Bailly arrived here in 1822 from the St. Joseph River in Michigan. He had been a fur trader on Lake Michigan for nearly 30 years when he set up his family home along the Little Calumet River.

The Chellberg Farm is also a three generation home, but of the family of Anders Kjellburg (Chellberg). He brought his family to this Swedish community in 1869, purchasing 80 acres (32 ha) from the Bailly descendants. The farm is located on Mineral Springs Road, north of U.S. 20.

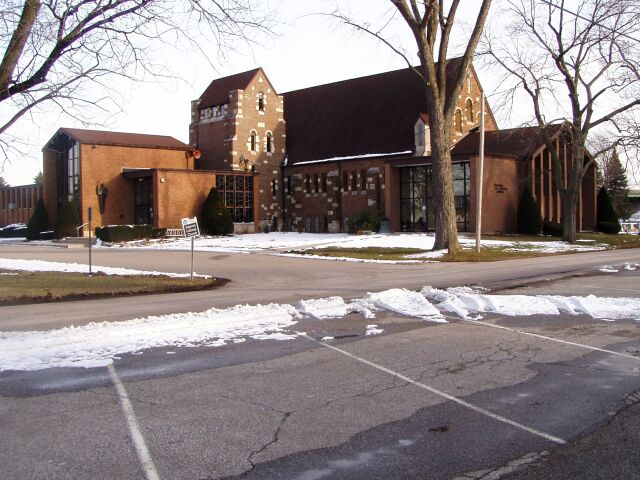
Augsburg Lutheran Church

The Augsburg Swedish Lutheran Church and Cemetery are located on Beam Street, west of town. The cemetery was founded in 1878.

In addition to the Joseph Bailly Homestead, the Good Fellow Club Youth Camp and Porter Town Hall are listed on the National Register of Historic Places.

== Geography ==
According to the 2010 census, Porter has a total area of 6.48 square miles (16.78 km^{2}), of which 6.2 square miles (16.06 km^{2}) (or 95.68%) is land and 0.28 square miles (0.73 km^{2}) (or 4.32%) is water.

== Demographics ==
Historical population
Census	Pop.	Note	%±
1880	224		—
1910	524		—
1920	699		33.4%
1930	805		15.2%
1940	1,190		47.8%
1950	1,458		22.5%
1960	2,189		50.1%
1970	3,058		39.7%
1980	2,988		−2.3%
1990	3,118		4.4%
2000	4,972		59.5%
2010	4,858		−2.3%
2020	5,210		7.2%
Source: US Census Bureau

=== 2020 census ===
As of the 2020 census, Porter had a population of 5,210. The median age was 41.6 years. 21.6% of residents were under the age of 18 and 15.2% of residents were 65 years of age or older. For every 100 females there were 97.6 males, and for every 100 females age 18 and over there were 95.2 males age 18 and over.

100.0% of residents lived in urban areas, while 0.0% lived in rural areas.

There were 2,105 households in Porter, of which 30.7% had children under the age of 18 living in them. Of all households, 49.1% were married-couple households, 19.1% were households with a male householder and no spouse or partner present, and 24.0% were households with a female householder and no spouse or partner present. About 25.6% of all households were made up of individuals and 9.7% had someone living alone who was 65 years of age or older.

There were 2,250 housing units, of which 6.4% were vacant. The homeowner vacancy rate was 1.1% and the rental vacancy rate was 4.1%.

Racial composition as of the 2020 census
Race	Number	Percent
White	4,533	87.0%
Black or African American	118	2.3%
American Indian and Alaska Native	23	0.4%
Asian	53	1.0%
Native Hawaiian and Other Pacific Islander	1	0.0%
Some other race	126	2.4%
Two or more races	356	6.8%
Hispanic or Latino (of any race)	488	9.4%

=== 2010 census ===
As of the census of 2010, there were 4,858 people, 1,832 households, and 1,310 families living in the town. The population density was 783.5 inhabitants per square mile (302.5/km^{2}). There were 1,978 housing units at an average density of 319.0 per square mile (123.2/km^{2}). The racial makeup of the town was 94.3% White, 1.1% African American, 0.3% Native American, 0.9% Asian, 1.6% from other races, and 1.7% from two or more races. Hispanic or Latino of any race were 6.6% of the population.

There were 1,832 households, of which 35.6% had children under the age of 18 living with them, 56.3% were married couples living together, 9.7% had a female householder with no husband present, 5.5% had a male householder with no wife present, and 28.5% were non-families. 21.5% of all households were made up of individuals, and 6.1% had someone living alone who was 65 years of age or older. The average household size was 2.65 and the average family size was 3.12.

The median age in the town was 39.1 years. 25.6% of residents were under the age of 18; 7.6% were between the ages of 18 and 24; 27% were from 25 to 44; 29.2% were from 45 to 64; and 10.7% were 65 years of age or older. The gender makeup of the town was 49.5% male and 50.5% female.

=== 2000 census ===
As of the census of 2000, there were 4,972 people, 1,844 households, and 1,300 families living in the town. The population density was 788.8 inhabitants per square mile (304.6/km^{2}). There were 1,966 housing units at an average density of 311.9 per square mile (120.4/km^{2}). The racial makeup of the town was 96.14% White, 0.82% African American, 0.22% Native American, 0.58% Asian, 0.62% from other races, and 1.61% from two or more races. Hispanic or Latino of any race were 4.69% of the population.

There were 1,844 households, out of which 38.4% had children under the age of 18 living with them, 55.8% were married couples living together, 10.8% had a female householder with no husband present, and 29.5% were non-families. 23.3% of all households were made up of individuals, and 5.9% had someone living alone who was 65 years of age or older. The average household size was 2.62 and the average family size was 3.12.

In the town, the population was spread out, with 28.3% under the age of 18, 9.9% from 18 to 24, 32.6% from 25 to 44, 21.5% from 45 to 64, and 7.8% who were 65 years of age or older. The median age was 33 years. For every 100 females, there were 95.4 males. For every 100 females age 18 and over, there were 92.7 males.

The median income for a household in the town was $50,625, and the median income for a family was $60,254. Males had a median income of $50,799 versus $26,055 for females. The per capita income for the town was $24,615. About 4.9% of families and 6.5% of the population were below the poverty line, including 7.7% of those under age 18 and 1.4% of those age 65 or over.
