= Lassen (surname) =

Lassen is a Danish and Norwegian patronymic surname meaning "son of Lars" (equivalent of Laurentius), and thus a parallel form of the more common surname Larsen. Notable people with the surname include:

- Ana Irma Rivera Lassén (born 1955), Afro-Puerto Rican attorney
- Anders Lassen (1920–1945), Danish recipient of the British Victoria Cross
- Birger Stuevold Lassen (1927–2011), Norwegian jurist
- Carl Christian Lassen (born 1943), Danish sailor
- Christian Lassen (1800-1876), Norwegian-German orientalist
- Christian Riese Lassen, American artist known for marine art
- Christina Markus Lassen (born 1970), Danish diplomat
- Clyde Everett Lassen (1942–1994), United States Navy aviator and Medal of Honor recipient
- Cody Lassen, American theatre producer
- Eduard Lassen (1830–1904), Belgian composer
- Edward Lassen (1876–1938), English golfer
- Elna Lassen (1901–1930), Danish ballerina
- Emil Lassen, American military officer
- Erik Sætter-Lassen (1892–1966), Danish sport shooter
- Ewald Lassen (1911–?), German classical violinist
- Flemming Lassen (1902–1984), Danish architect
- Georg Lassen (1915–2012), German U-boat captain
- Hans Lassen (1926–2011), Danish Governor of Greenland
- Harald Lassen (born 1987), Norwegian jazz musician
- Hartvig Lassen (1824–1897), Norwegian editor and literary historian
- Henrik Andreas Zetlitz Lassen, Norwegian politician
- Inger Lassen (1911–1957), Danish actress
- Jacob Lassen (born 1995), Danish handball player
- Jan Gerhard Lassen (born 1949), Norwegian civil servant and diplomat
- Jeane Lassen (born 1980), Canadian weightlifter
- Justin Lassen (born 1981), American composer, producer, multi-instrumentalist and remixer
- Lars Lassen (1761–1823), Danish politician
- Leigh Lassen, American actress
- Leo Lassen (1899–1975), American baseball announcer
- Loulou Lassen (1876–1947), Danish journalist, writer and translator
- Matias Lassen (born 1996), Danish ice hockey player
- Mikkel Lassen (born 2001), Danish footballer
- Mogens Lassen (1901–1987), Danish architect
- Moira Lassen (born 1963), Canadian weightlifting referee
- Napoleon Ashley-Lassen (born 1934), Chief of the Defence Staff of the Ghana Armed Forces
- Niels A. Lassen (1926–1997), Danish medical researcher
- Niels Lassen (farmer) (c. 1729–1811), Danish farmer
- Peter Lassen (footballer) (born 1966), Danish football player
- Peter Lassen (1800–1859), Danish-American rancher, prospector and explorer
- Søren Sætter-Lassen (born 1955), Danish actor
- Stefan Lassen (born 1985), Danish ice hockey player
- Sverre Lassen-Urdahl (1913–2005), Norwegian alpine skier
- Teitur Lassen (born 1977), Faroese musician, composer, singer-songwriter and producer
- Tue Lassen, Danish orienteering competitor
- Werner Lassen (born 1974), Namibian golfer

== See also ==
- Larsen (disambiguation)
- Larson (disambiguation)
