= Lárusson =

Lárusson may refer to:

- Bjarni Lárusson (born 1976), Icelandic former professional footballer
- Daði Lárusson (born 1973), Icelandic former footballer
- Georg Kr. Lárusson (born 1959), former director of the Icelandic Directorate of Immigration
- Guðmundur Lárusson (1925–2010), Icelandic sprinter
- Magnús Már Lárusson (1917–2006), Icelandic theologian and historian
- Sigurður Egill Lárusson (born 1992), Icelandic football midfielder
- Þórður Lárusson (born 1954), Icelandic former football manager

== See also ==
- Larrison
- Larsen (disambiguation)
- Larson (disambiguation)
- Larssen
- Larsson
