= Lassen =

Lassen may refer to:

== Places ==
- Janesville, California, previously known as Lassen
- Lassen County, California, in northeastern California
- Lassen Hotel (Cedar Lake, Indiana), historic building
- Lassen Hotel (Wichita, Kansas), historic building
- Lassen National Forest, in northeastern California
- Lassen Peak, volcano in the Cascade Range
- Lassen Volcanic National Park, in northeastern California

== Other ==
- Lassen (surname)
- Lassen Community College, community college in Susanville, California
- Lassen Emigrant Trail, historical wagon road in California
- Lassen Fragment, parchment page from c. 1275. in the Royal Danish Library of Copenhagen
- Lassen State Highway, in California
- Lassen Volcanic Center
- Lomatium ravenii, also known as Lassen parsley
- Tripterocalyx crux-maltae, also known as Lassen sandverbena
- USS Lassen (AE-3), US Naval destroyer
- USS Lassen (DDG-82), US Naval destroyer

== See also ==
- Larsen (disambiguation)
- Larson (disambiguation)
