= Portage Township Schools =

School district in Indiana

Location
- 6240 US Highway 6 Portage, Indiana 46368 United States

District information
- Grades: K–12
- Superintendent: Amanda Alaniz
- Schools: 11

Students and staff
- Students: 7,439 (2018-19)
- Teachers: 425.77 (on an FTE basis)
- Student–teacher ratio: 17.47
- District mascot: Indian

Other information
- Website: www.portage.k12.in.us

Portage Township Schools is a public school district based in Portage, Indiana. Its boundaries are the same as Portage Township and includes the city of Portage, the town of Ogden Dunes and unincorporated areas including South Haven.

== Schools ==
There are 11 schools in the system.

- Portage High School
- Fegely Intermediate School
- Willowcreek Middle School
- Central Elementary School
- Crisman Elementary School
- Jones Elementary School
- Kyle Elementary School
- Myers Elementary School
- Saylor Elementary School
- South Haven Elementary School
