= Nike Missile Site C-47 =

- U.S. National Register of Historic Places
- U.S. Historic district
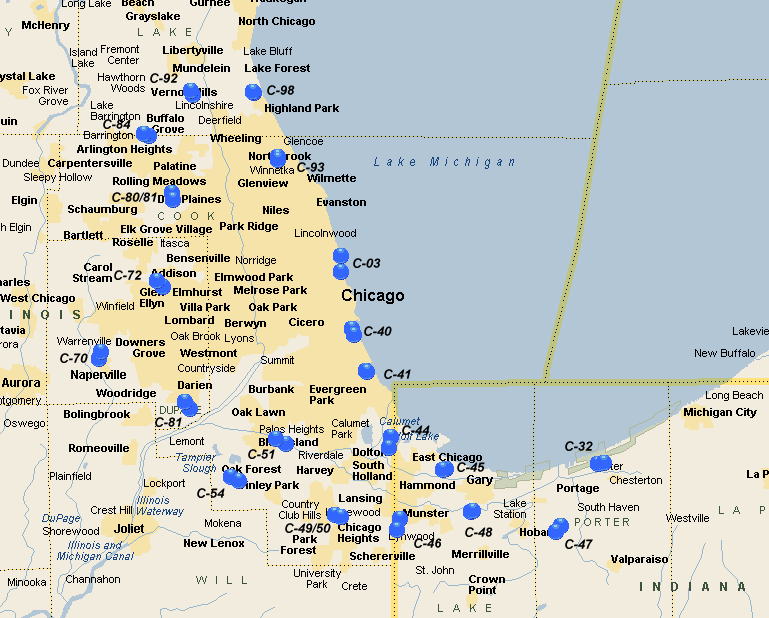

- Location within Indiana Location within the United States
- Nearest city: County Roads 600N and 700N, less than a mile north of Wheeler in Portage Township, Porter County, Indiana
- Coordinates: 41°31′24″N 87°10′40″W
- Area: 29 acres (12 ha)
- Architect: U.S. Army
- Architectural style: Modern Movement
- NRHP reference No.: 99001669
- Added to NRHP: January 21, 2000

Nike Missile Site C-47 is a former missile site near Portage, Indiana. The Nike defense system was a Cold War-era missile system in the United States. Nike missiles were radar guided, supersonic antiaircraft missiles. The planners hoped that Nike would make a direct attack on the U.S. so costly as to be futile.

Nike missile sites were constructed in defensive rings around major urban and industrial areas. Chicago was likely selected because of its population, the presence of several military bases, and the Gary, Indiana, steel industry. Nike C-47 (Nike 1B, 1C/12H, 20A/12L-U, (8L-H)) near Portage was designed with two units nearly a mile apart. The first section was the Launcher Area located on the south side of County Road 700 North, approximately 1/4 mile (0.40 km) west of County Road 500 West, in Porter County, Indiana. The second area was the Control Area, also known as the Administration Area, located on the north side of County Road 600 North, near Wheeler. Construction of the base began in 1954 and it was operational by 1956.

== Facility ==
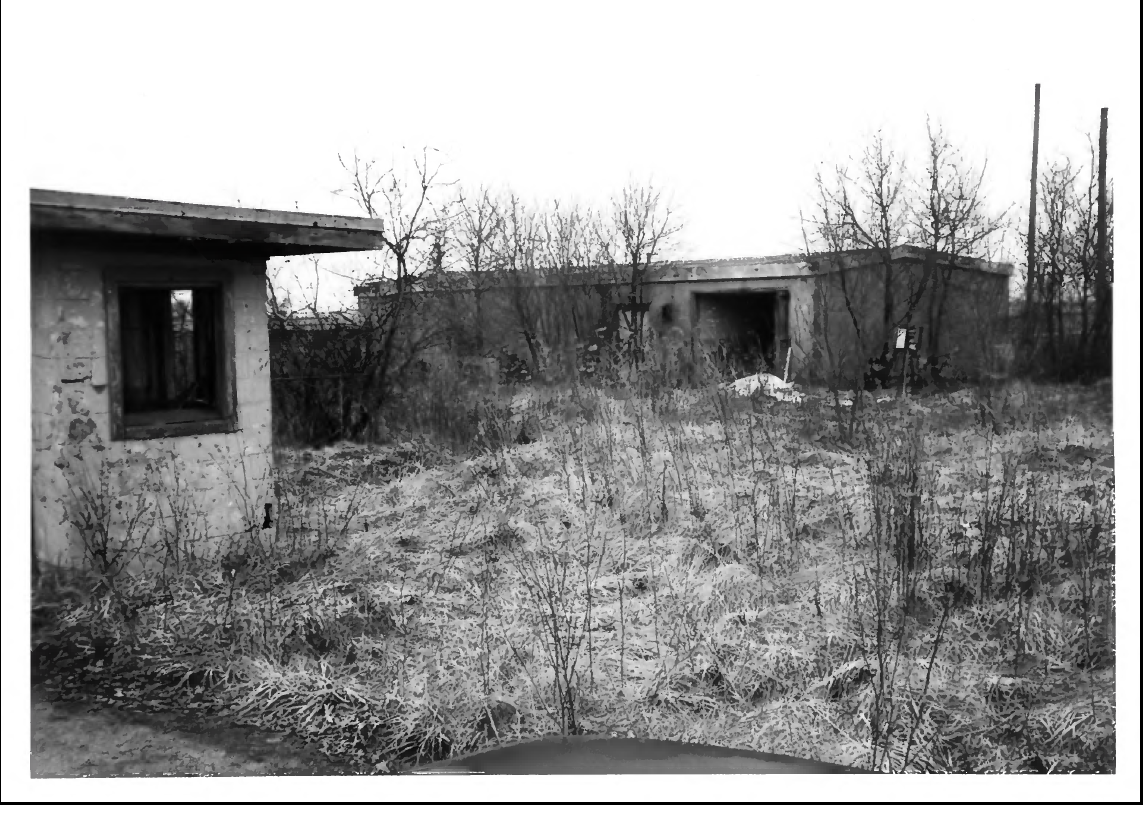
Building #2 and the Fallout Shelter

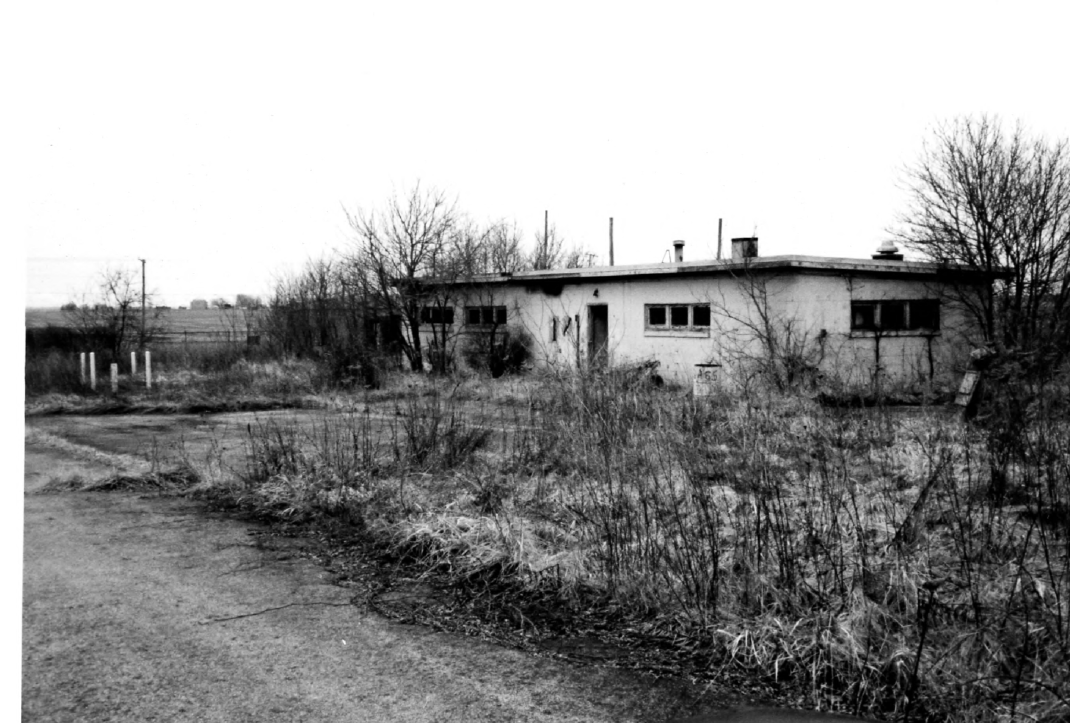
Duty Barracks

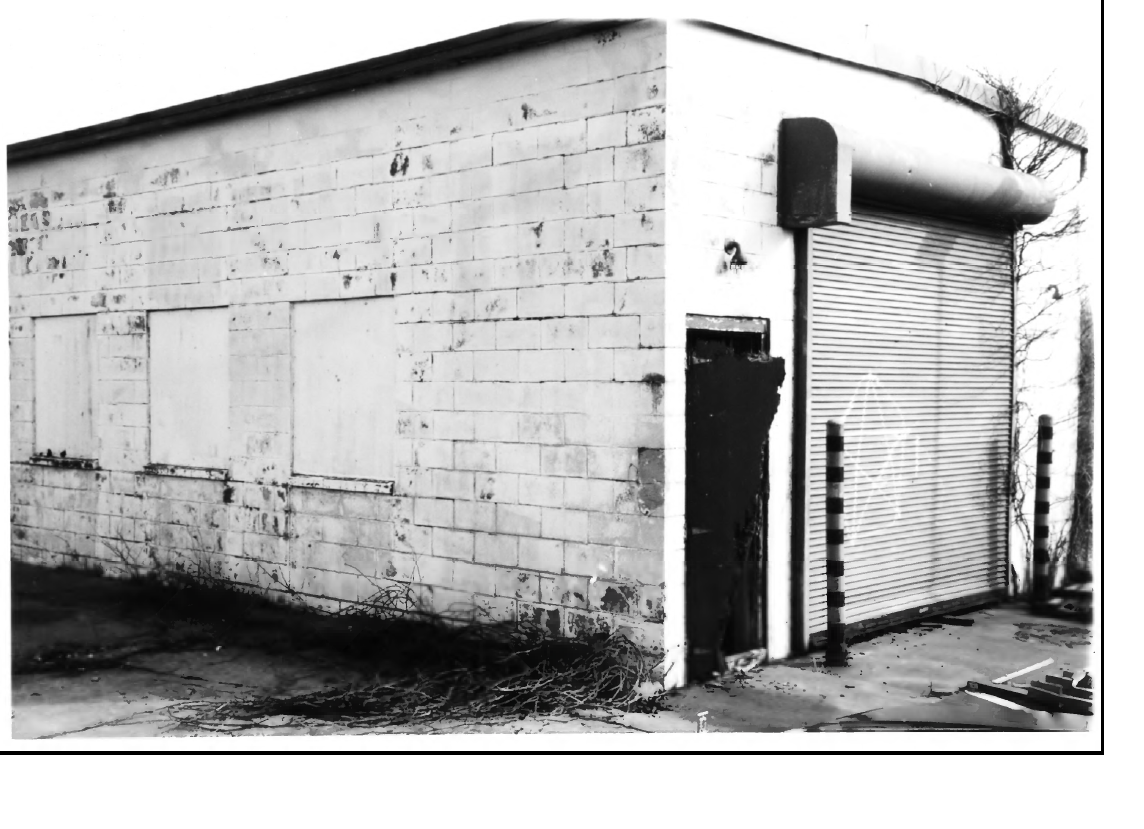
Missile Assembly Building

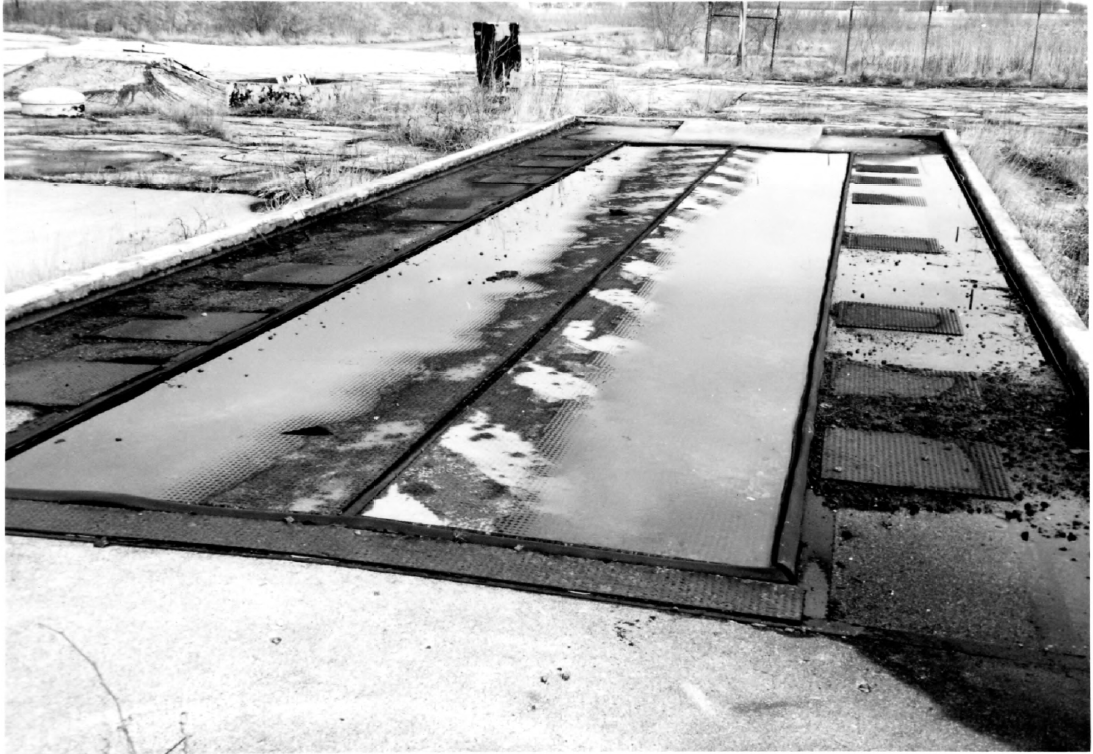
Missile Elevator doors

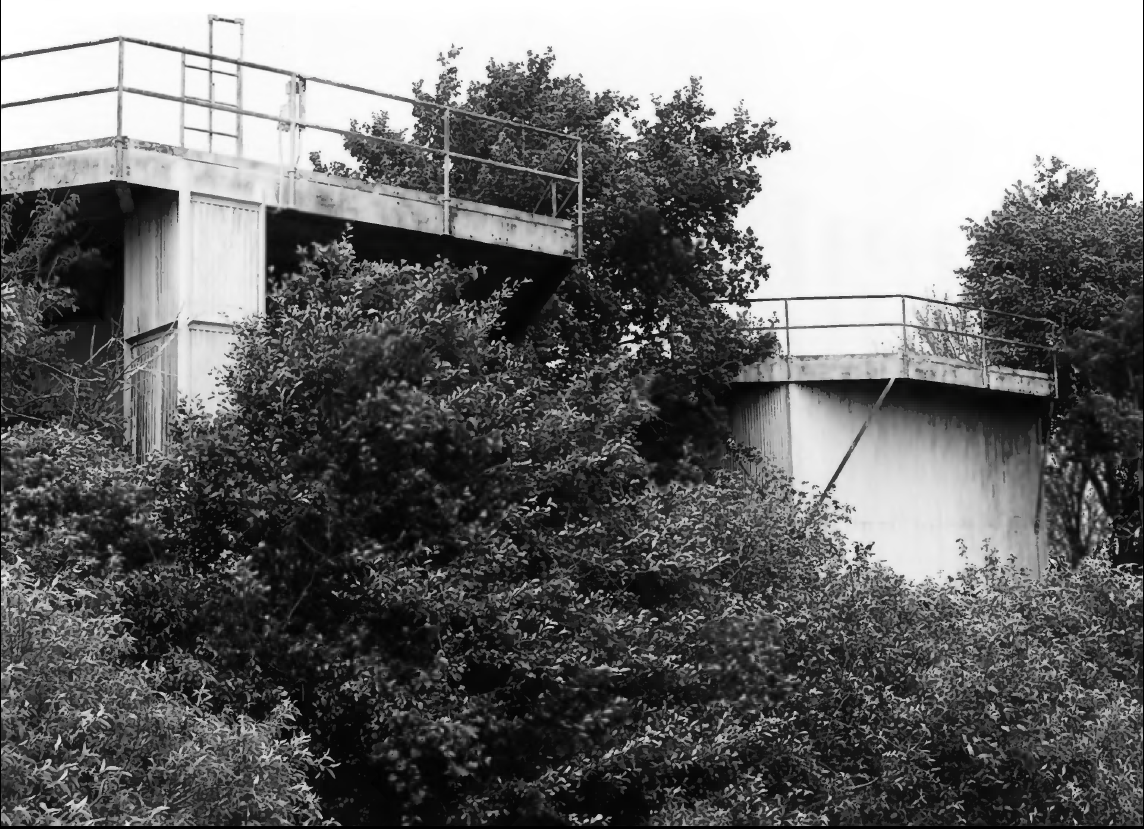
Radar Towers

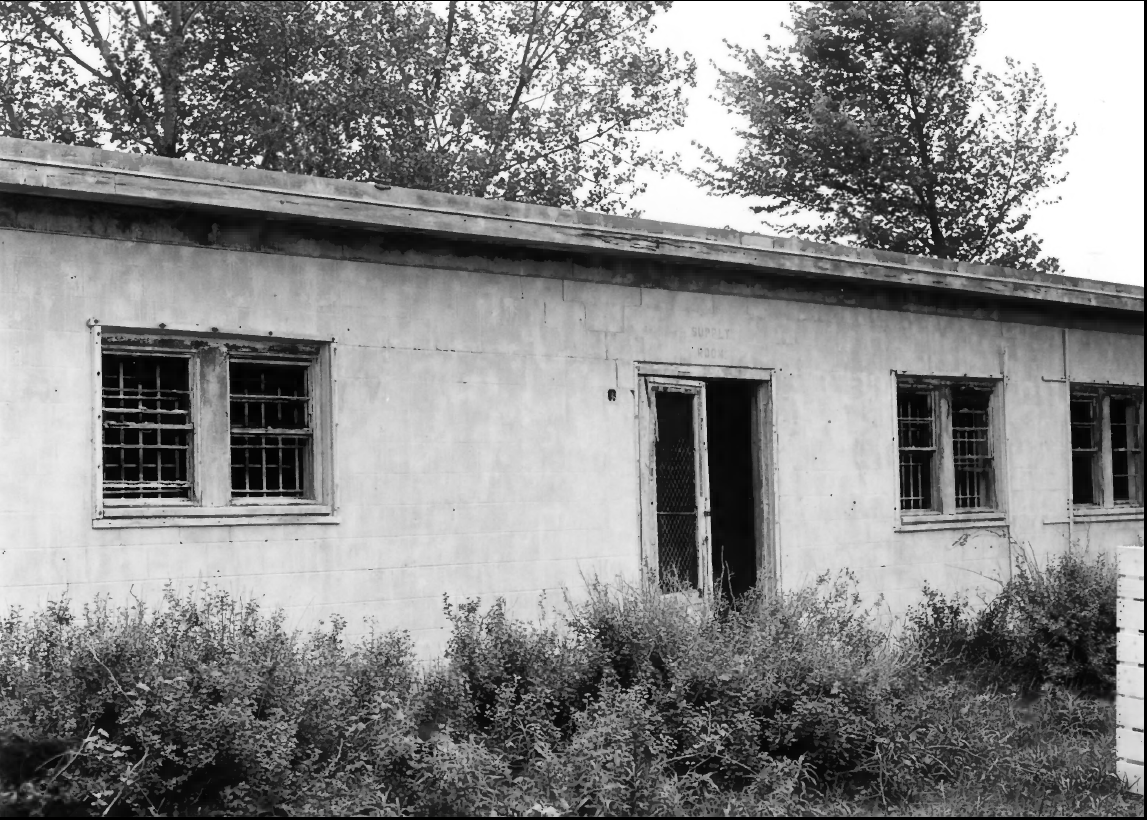
Headquarters building

== Chicago–Gary Defense Area ==
The Chicago defensive area, one of the larger in the nation, had about 20 bases ringing metropolitan Chicago. Due to the relatively short range of the first generation Nike missiles, bases had to be close to the area they protected.

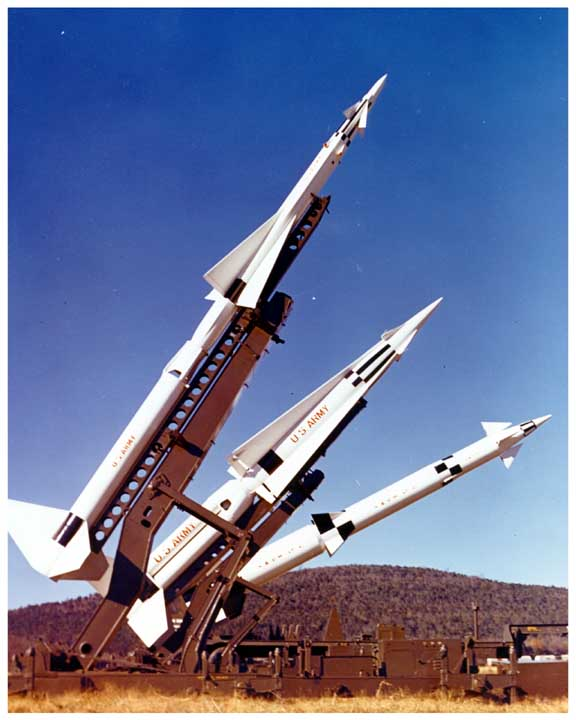
Nike Missile Family

The Army began to buy land and build sites in the early 1950s. The basic system was operational by 1954 using MIM-3 Nike Ajax missiles. Newer Nike missiles extended the capability of the rings. The "Nike-Hercules" were nuclear capable and could destroy fleets of Soviet bombers over a wide area. These were deployed at a few selected sites. The Hercules could reach Soviet airspace to intercept aircraft and had the potential to be used against ICBMs (intercontinental ballistic missiles). C-47 was one of the first Nike sites to receive the Hercules missiles.

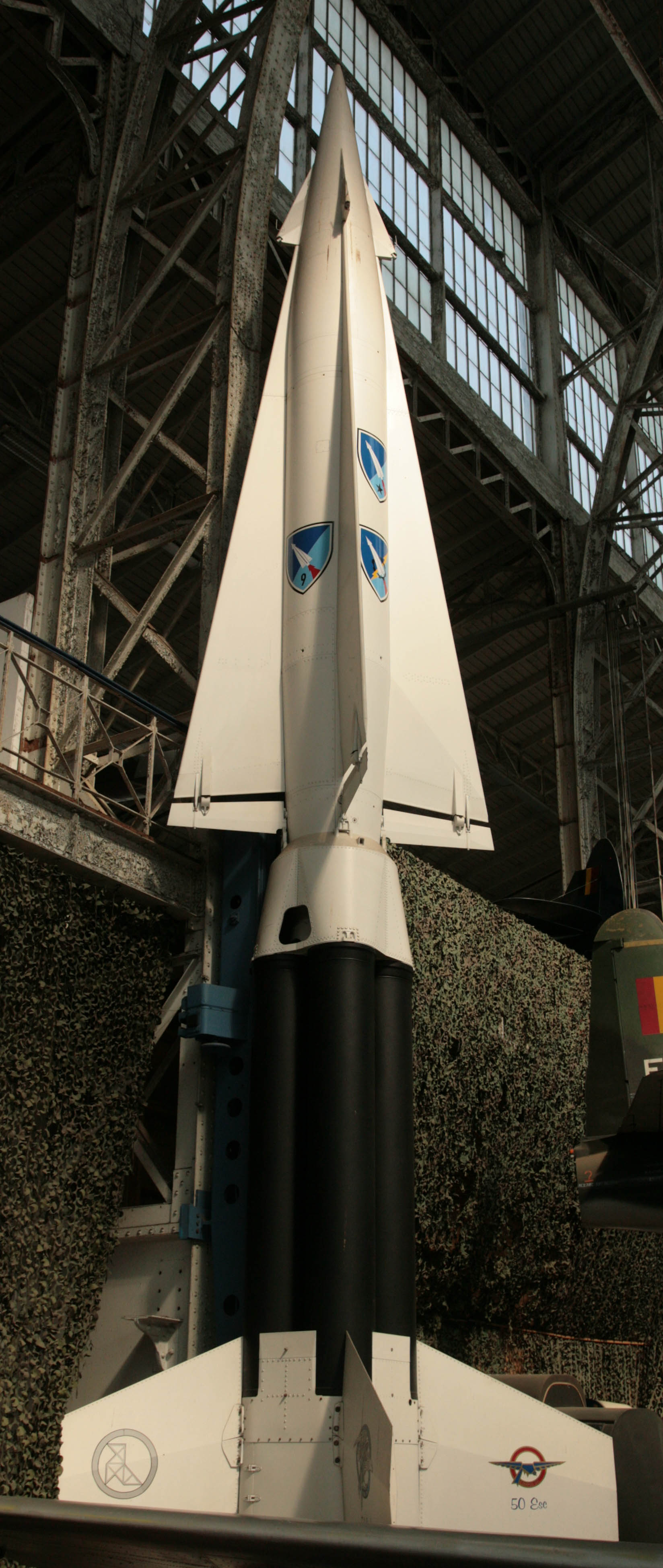
Nike Hercules

== Related sites ==
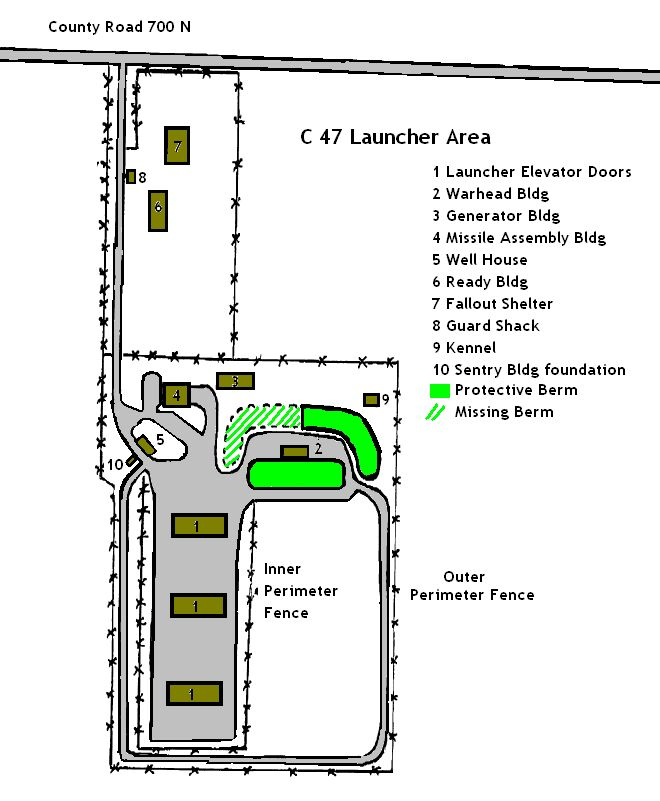
Missile Launch Area for Nike Base C-47. Based on drawing from No. 4799001669; National Register of Historic Places, Registration Form; Nike Missile Site C47; United States Department of the Interior, National Park Service, 2000

- C-32 Nike 3B/12H, 20A/12L-U in Porter, Indiana, was redeveloped for the offices of the Indiana Dunes National Lakeshore. The launch site is a half-mile east of the National Lakeshore offices on Wagner Road, and is fenced behind a locked gate, although largely intact. It is privately owned, and while overgrown at one point there has been some clean up of the area.
- C-44 Nike 2B, 4C/60A/24L-AA in Hegewisch/Wolf Lake, Illinois (dual site) is abandoned and overgrown at the south end of recreation area. The access road entrance at Avenue J and 133rd Street is largely obliterated. The launch site is also abandoned. It is on the north shore of the lake, where S. Wolf Lake Boulevard becomes S. State Line Road. The buildings are gone but foundations remain.
- C-45 Nike 2B/20A/8L-A at Gary Municipal Airport, Indiana, is a redeveloped area at the north tip of the airport. A general aviation hangar, parking lot, and ramp area for aircraft parking were created. The former launch site is across Industrial Highway. The launch site was razed but remnants are still visible.
- C-46 Nike 1B, 1C/12H, 20A/12L-U, (8L-H) in Munster, Indiana, was redeveloped into an industrial park. It is on the west side of Calumet Avenue north of 45th Street. The launch site is on the west side of Columbia Avenue. It was razed in 2008 and is now in private ownership.
- C-48 Nike 2B/20A/8L-A in Gary, Indiana, was redeveloped as an automobile dealership on Grant Street and later abandoned. The launch site was redeveloped into commercial/industrial site near NW corner of 35th Avenue and Grant Street.

== Discontinuance ==
The Nike system protected the United States until 1972. The bases were closed in accord with the SALT treaty limits, and the onset of "détente".

== Significance ==
To be eligible for the National Register of Historic Places, Nike sites are required to be historically exceptional and retain a high degree of integrity, including all three major components: (1) administration, (2) radar, and (3) launch functions. There are fifteen Nike sites in Illinois that are part of the Chicago-Gary Defense Area. Several have some buildings and launch areas. C-84 in Palatine, Illinois, was the last substantial site to be redeveloped. Five of the bases in the Chicago ring were in Indiana. C-47 is the only site to retain all three functions. A few buildings remain at several of the bases in Indiana. The National Park Service uses several buildings from a base near the Chellberg Farm for offices and service buildings at Indiana Dunes National Park. As elsewhere, they are remnants of bases, not complete units. The early use of nuclear missiles on the site further makes C-47 a rare and exceptional site.

== Missiles on display ==
- A Nike Ajax and Hercules are on display in front of the VFW post in Cedar Lake, Indiana.
- A Nike Ajax is on display near the Toledo Rockets Glass Bowl Stadium on the campus of the University of Toledo in Toledo, Ohio.
- A Nike Ajax is on display in front of the Villa Park VFW post # 2801 in Villa Park Illinois

== See also ==
- List of Nike missile sites

== Bibliography ==
- Bender, Donald E. Nike Missile Defense System Overview. Internet web page, bender@alpha.fdu.edu., online as of 1998.
- Carlson, Christina, Robert Lyon, Christine Whitacre, et al. Last Line of Defense, Nike Missile Sites in Illinois. Denver, CO: National Park Service, Rocky Mountain System Support Office, 1996. Center for Air Force History, et al. Coming in from the Cold, Military Heritage in the Cold War. U.S. Air Force, Legacy Program, June 1994.
- Lennox, Duncan. Jane's Strategic Weapons System. Surrey, United Kingdom: Jane's Information Group, 1990.
- Morgan, Mark L. and Mark Berhow. Rings of Supersonic Steel, Air Defenses of the United States Army, 1950–1979, An Introductory History and Site Guide. San Pedro, CA: Fort MacArthur Museum Association, 1996.
