= Larceny (disambiguation) =

Larceny is a form of theft.

Larceny may also refer to:

- Larceny (1948 film), an American film noir crime film
- Larceny (1996 film), an unreleased short film by Christopher Nolan
- Larceny (2004 film), a comedy film
- A bourbon whiskey made by Old Fitzgerald

== See also ==
- Larceny Act
- Larceny, Inc., a 1942 film
- Larsen (disambiguation)
