= Wassen (surname) =

Wassen is a surname. Notable people with the surname include:

- Christina Wassen (born 1999), German diver
- Elena Wassen (born 2000), German competitive diver
- Rogier Wassen (born 1976), Dutch tennis player

== See also ==
- Lassen
- Wassén (surname)
