= Lassen Hotel =

Lassen Hotel may refer to:

- Lassen Hotel (Cedar Lake, Indiana), listed on the National Register of Historic Places (NRHP) in Lake County, Indiana
- Lassen Hotel (Wichita, Kansas), NRHP-listed
