= Monon Park Dancing Pavilion =

- U.S. National Register of Historic Places
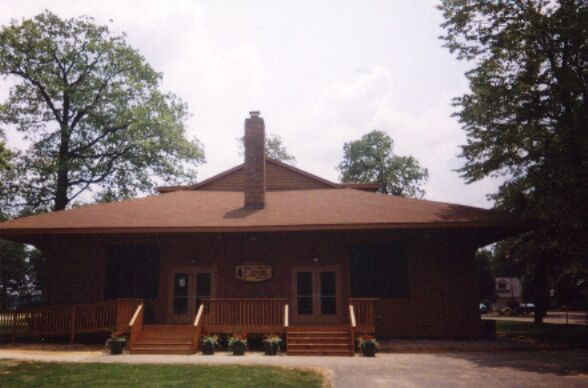
- Monon Park Dancing Pavilion, September 2012

- Location within Indiana Location within the United States
- Location: 13701 Lauerman St., Cedar Lake, Indiana
- Coordinates: 41°22′7″N 87°26′22″W
- Area: less than one acre
- Built: 1897
- Architect: Stiles and Stone
- Architectural style: Stick/eastlake
- NRHP reference No.: 00001540
- Added to NRHP: January 3, 2001

Monon Park Dancing Pavilion is a historic dance hall building located at Cedar Lake, Indiana, United States. It was built in 1897, as a one-story, open air frame building supported by brick piers. The building measures 55 feet by 110 feet and has a massive gable-on-hip roof with deeply overhanging eaves. It displays some Stick style and Eastlake movement design elements. The building was acquired in 1915 by the Moody Memorial Bible Church, who enclosed and enlarged the original structure. A restoration project was underway in 2013.

It was listed in the National Register of Historic Places in 1981.
