= Josephus Wolf House =

Historic house in Indiana, United States

- U.S. National Register of Historic Places
- Indiana Register of Historic Sites
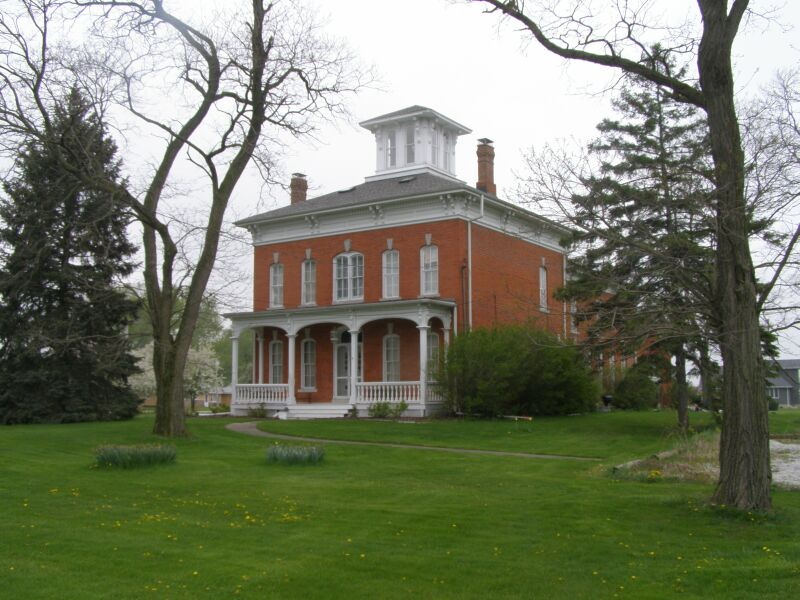

- Location within Indiana Location within the United States
- Nearest city: Portage, Indiana
- Coordinates: 41°32′11″N 87°8′41″W
- Area: less than one acre
- Built: 1875
- Architectural style: Italianate
- NRHP reference No.: 07001281
- Added to NRHP: December 19, 2007

The Josephus Wolf House is a Victorian Italianate mansion in Portage, Indiana built in 1875. The farm consisted of 4,500 acres (1,800 ha) in Portage Township, Porter County. It was the center piece of a family farm that included four additional buildings for beef and dairy animals. The three-story house has 7,800 square feet (720 m^{2}). The house consists of 18 rooms with pine molding and red oak floors. The main rooms include a formal parlor, kitchen, dining room, sitting room, study and several bedrooms. The main hall includes a walnut staircase. From the second level, another stairway leads to the attic and a white cupola on the roof. The cupola is 45 feet (14 m) above the ground. The cupola provided a view of the entire farm, as well as Chicago on a clear day.

The building was placed on the National Historic Register in 2007. Over its life, it has been a home, Franciscan monastery of the Seven Dolors Shrine, women's homeless shelter, antique store and a bridal shop. Today, the mansion grounds includes 5.2 acres (2.1 ha) and is being made into a tourist attraction.

== Significant features ==
The house was built of brick by German bricklayers. The walls are double thick using a common bond. On the interior, the walls are covered using plaster and lath. The sills, lintels and keystones around the openings are made of Indiana limestone.

The main feature of the house is the full-width front porch on the west side. There are significant feature in the molding as the ceiling mimics the eaves of the house and the rails and balusters wrap around the porch and are mimicked on the house side as well. The cupola is located over the center of the house and has two windows on each side. The windows are single pane, double hung with a rope trim.

The back of the house, the west side, includes a garage, previously a carriage house and is original. The exterior is simpler than that of the house. The original doorway has been bricked shut, but is still visible by the presence of the keystone and the brick arch.

== Interior ==
The first floor is arranged along the east–west entrance hall. The main doorway is a double door off the porch. The first floor ceiling is 12 feet (3.7 m) high in the main part of the house. The floor is red oak with seven doors leading into adjacent rooms. On the left (south) is the double parlor, which includes the front parlor and the dining room. These are connected by an archway. On the right (north) is the library and the stairway to the second floor. Behind the stairway on the right is a bath and a closet. Across the end of the entry hall is the Great Room, spanning the entire width of the house. Originally, the great room was two dining rooms. In the 1930s the dividing wall was removed. The Great Room provides access to the South Porch, the Kitchen and the rear stairway to the second floor.

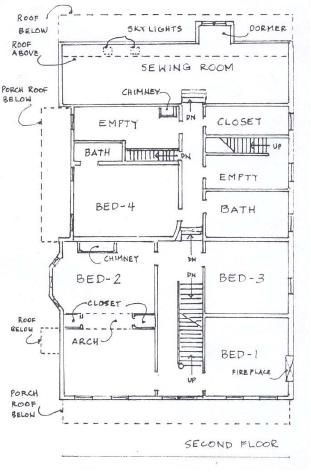
Second floor layout

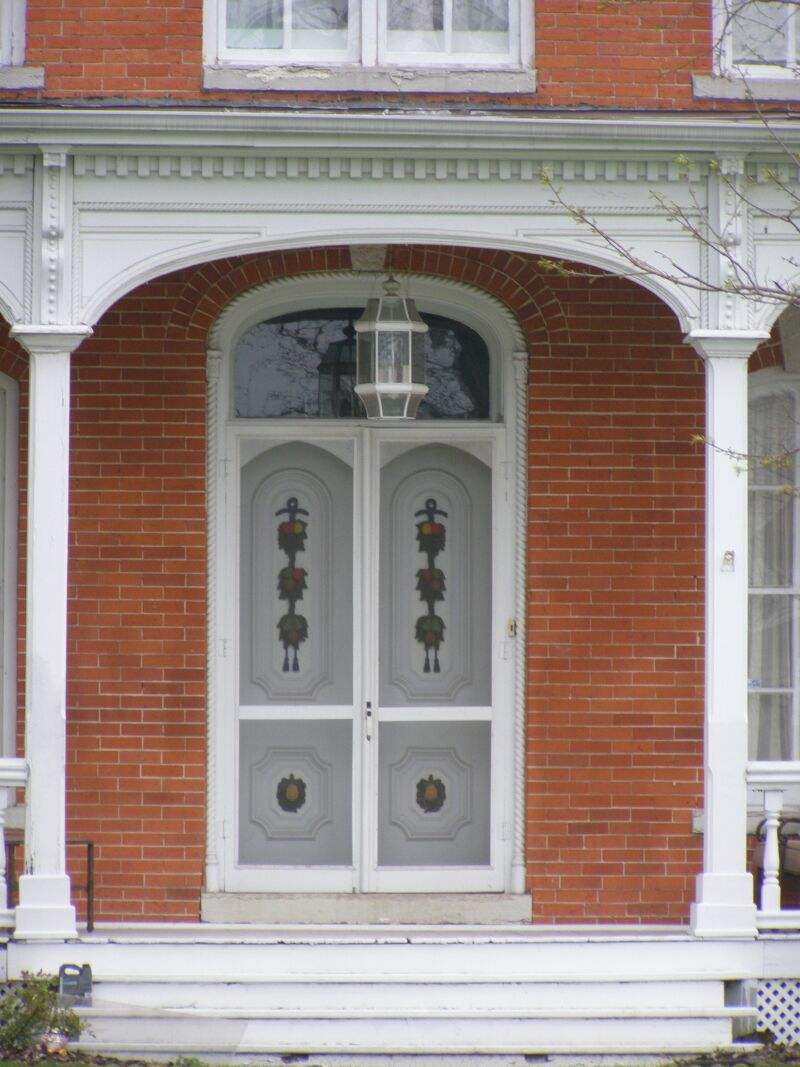
Main door
