= Wassén (surname) =

Wassén is a surname. Notable people with the surname include:

- Folke Wassén (1918–1969), Swedish sailor
- Henry Wassén (1908–1996), Swedish social anthropologist and museum head
- Magnus Wassén (1920–2014), Swedish sailor

== See also ==
- Wassen (surname)
