= Portage/Ogden Dunes station =

South Shore Line station in Indiana

Portage/Ogden Dunes
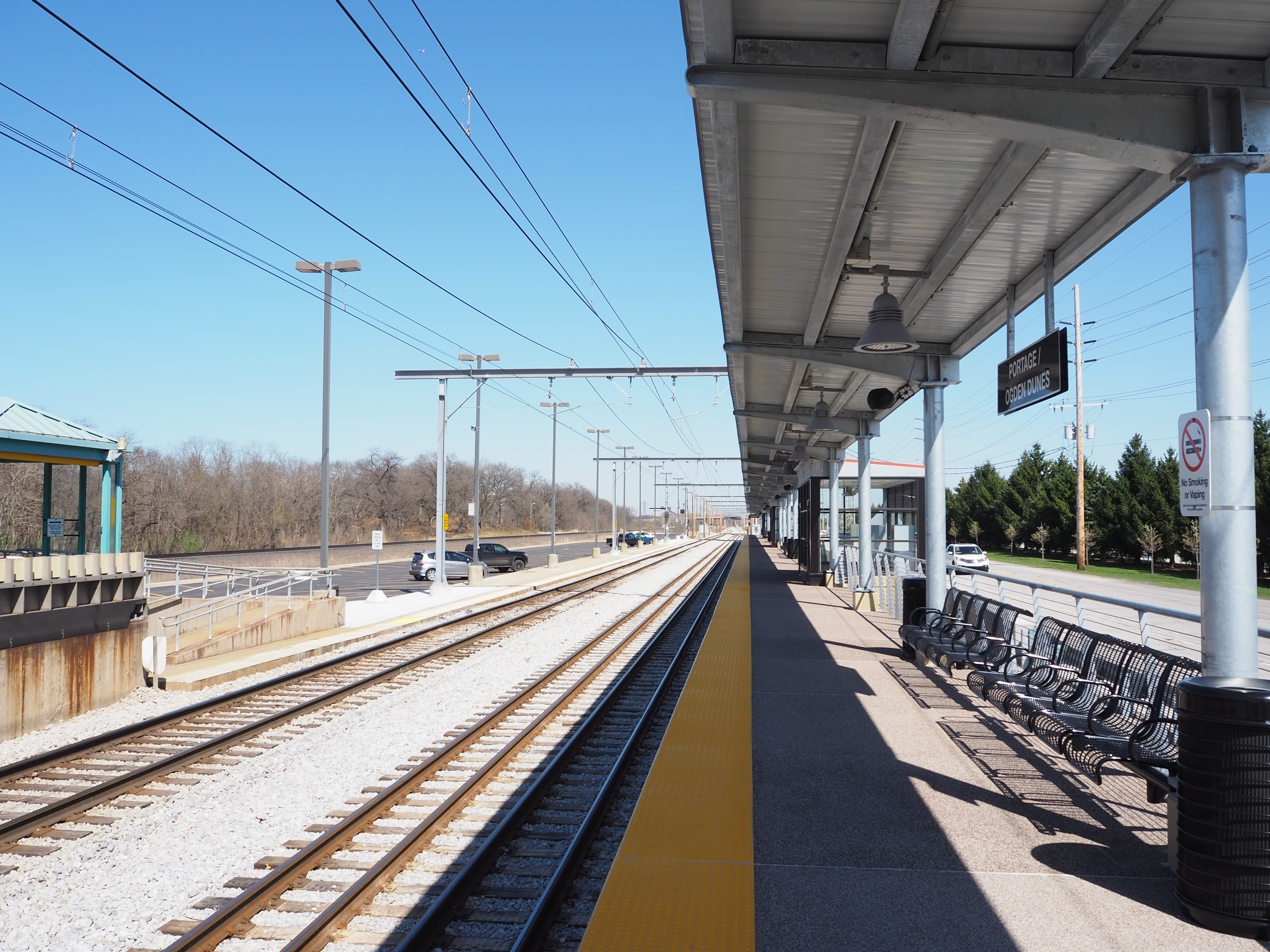
- High-level platform looking east, 2024

General information
- Location: U.S. Highway 12 and Hillcrest Road; Ogden Dunes, Indiana
- Coordinates: 41°37′2″N 87°11′12″W
- Owner: NICTD
- Platforms: 2 side platforms (one low-level, one high-level)
- Tracks: 2

Construction
- Parking: Yes
- Cycle facilities: Yes
- Accessible: Yes

Other information
- Fare zone: 6

History
- Opened: 1998
- Rebuilt: 2021–2024

Passengers
- 2019: 237 (average weekday)

Services
| Preceding station | NICTD | Following station |
|---|---|---|
| Miller toward Millennium Station | Lakeshore Corridor | Dune Park toward South Bend International Airport |
Track layout
Location

Portage/Ogden Dunes is a station in Porter County, Indiana serving the municipalities of Portage, Indiana and Ogden Dunes, Indiana. It is used by South Shore Line trains. Ogden Dunes is a semi-gated community with one major access road off of U.S. Highway 12, and the station is located adjacent to where this road accesses the community. The station also serves a Marina Shores subdivision in Portage. Portage/Ogden Dunes station is close to the Inland Marsh and West Beach units of the Indiana Dunes National Park.

== Station layout ==
The station has a northern low-level platform and a southern high-level platform with most trains in both directions boarding on the high-level platform. Three small passenger shelters are positioned at the beginning, middle and end of the low-level platform. The low-level platform is accessible thanks to a ramp structure located at the west end of the platform, designed to sync up to the first car of the train.

== History ==
Ogden Dunes was established as a flag stop along the line in the 1920s. The original stop was located about 100 feet (30 m) west of the modern stop and featured a waiting shelter, a platform, and single row or parking accessed immediately off of Dunes Highway to the south of the single-track railway.

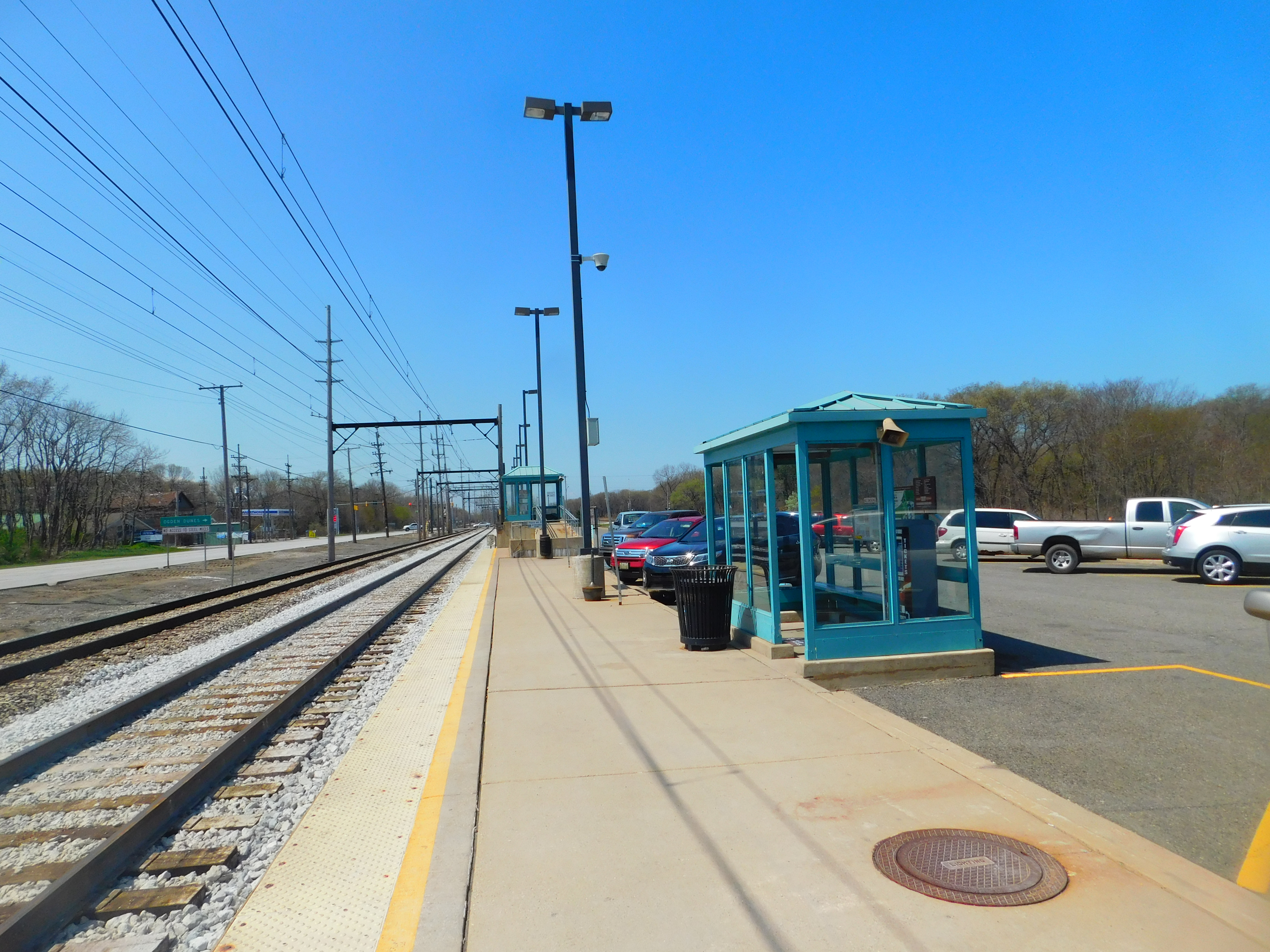
The 1998-built low-level platform and waiting shelter, seen in 2016

Portage/Ogden Dunes was built in 1998–1999 to replace the original stop. The new station removed this southern platform and parking area, and instead constructed a new platform and double-row of angled parking north of the single-track. The project also included construction a new track to the north of the existing single-track east and west of the station, but within the station area a new track was built to the south of the existing single-track. This new southern track was then connected at either end of the station with the old single-track to become Track 1, and the new northern track outside the station area was connected to the old single-track within the station area to become Track 2.

=== Renovation ===
As part of a larger project to double-track the South Shore Line, Portage/Ogden Dunes saw a renovation from 2021 to 2024. Since the station was already double-tracked, it did not see a new track. However, a new high-level platform was built adjacent to the southern (eastbound) track, with a gauntlet track to allow freight trains to pass. The existing platform adjacent to the northern (westbound) track remained unchanged and was already accessible to passengers with disabilities due to having a ramp structure. The renovation also added a new parking lot with 354 spaces across Dunes Highway to the south of the station and a signalized pedestrian crossing of the Dune Highway to connect the station to this lot.
