= Windhoek Country Club Resort =

Multi-use resort near Windhoek, Namibia

Coordinates: 22°37′2″S 17°4′37″E

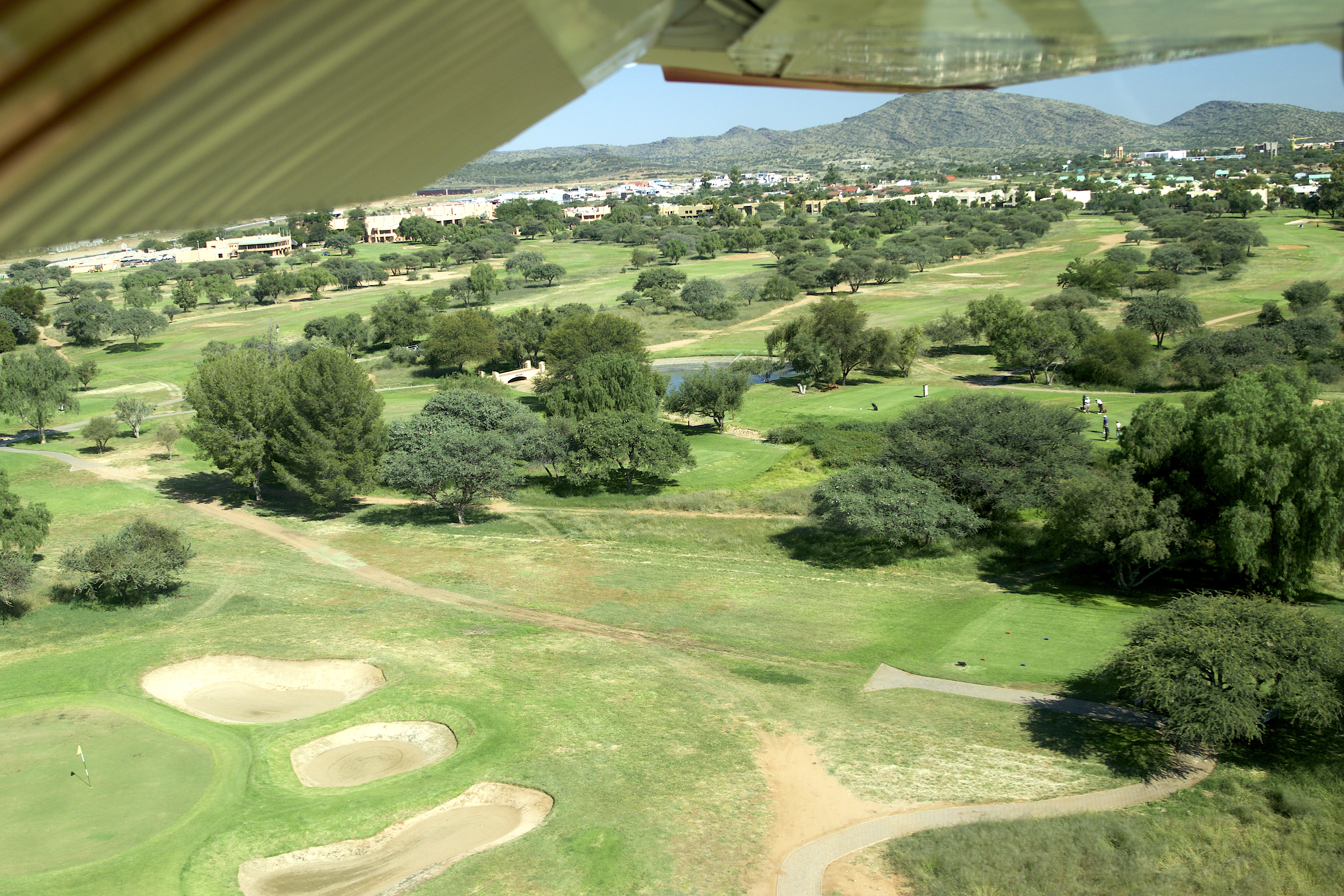
Windhoek Country Club Resort (2018)

The Windhoek Country Club Resort is a multi-use resort outside of Windhoek, Namibia owned by the Government of Namibia, and managed by Legacy Hotels and Resorts International. The Resort was opened in May 1995 and was home to the 1995 Miss Universe Pageant. The resort's golf course is home to the yearly Bank Windhoek Namibian Open Golf Tournament. The Hotel consists of 152 rooms, of which 18 are family rooms, 39 are luxury, 87 are twin, 7 suites and 1 paraplegic room. The resort also includes a casino.

Many of the main boxing events and title fights in Namibia take place at the resort.

The Windhoek Country Club Resort is a member of the Hospitality Association of Namibia.

Preceded by Philippine International Convention Center (Philippines) Pasay	Miss Universe Venue; 1995	Succeeded by Aladdin Theatre for the Performing Arts (United States) Las Vegas
