= Portage Township, Porter County, Indiana =

Portage Township
- Township
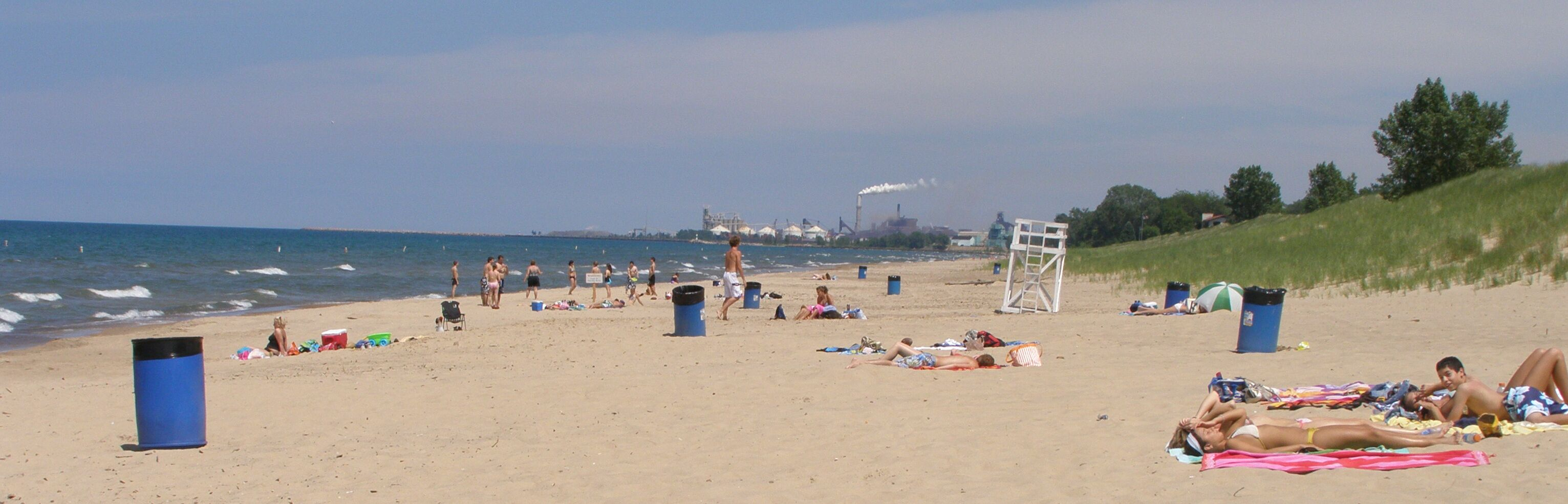
- West Beach at Indiana Dunes National Park

- Coordinates: 41°34′41″N 87°10′33″W
- Country: United States
- State: Indiana
- County: Porter

Government
  - Type: Indiana township
  - Township Trustee: Brenden Clancy (D)

Area
  - Total: 38.25 sq mi (99.07 km^{2})
  - Land: 35.57 sq mi (92.12 km^{2})
  - Water: 2.68 sq mi (6.95 km^{2})
- Elevation: 633 ft (193 m)

Population (2020)
  - Total: 47,946
  - Density: 1,323.8/sq mi (511.13/km^{2})
- Time zone: UTC-6 (Central (CST))
  - Summer (DST): UTC-5 (CDT)
- Area code: 219
- FIPS code: 18-61110
- GNIS feature ID: 453758
- Website: www.portagetwppcin.gov

Portage Township is one of twelve townships in Porter County, Indiana. As of the 2010 census, its population was 47,085. Portage Township was established in 1835.

The residents of Portage Township played pivotal roles in the conservation of the Indiana Dunes.

Historical population
Census	Pop.	Note	%±
1890	954		—
1900	1,014		6.3%
1910	959		−5.4%
1920	984		2.6%
1930	1,343		36.5%
1940	2,647		97.1%
1950	5,501		107.8%
1960	13,721		149.4%
1970	28,371		106.8%
1980	39,765		40.2%
1990	40,929		2.9%
2000	43,956		7.4%
2010	47,085		7.1%
2020	47,496		0.9%

== History ==
Portage Township was organized in 1836, and most likely was named after Portage County, Ohio.

The Nike Missile Site C47 and Josephus Wolf House are listed on the National Register of Historic Places.

== Cities and towns ==
The largest community in the township is the city of Portage. The bedroom community of the town of Ogden Dunes is also in this township as well as South Haven.

== Geography ==
=== City ===
- Portage (vast majority)

=== Town ===
- Ogden Dunes

=== Other Communities ===
- South Haven
- Willow Creek at 41.58671°N 87.183458°W
- Wilson at 41.607315°N 87.167564°W

== Parks ==
The city of Portage has an extensive park system. Also within the township is Indiana Dunes National Park's primary beach of West Beach and a facility called Portage Lakefront and Riverwalk.

== Education ==
Portage Township is home to Portage Township Schools.

Higher education:

- Purdue University North Central (classes offered at Portage High School)
- Indiana University Northwest
- Ivy Tech (classes offered at Willowcreek Middle School; full-service campus to be built in 2008)

High school:

- Portage High School

Middle schools:

- Willowcreek Middle School
- Fegely Middle School

Elementary schools:

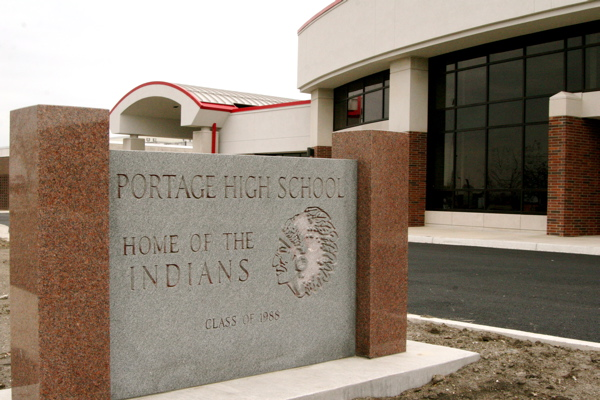
Portage High School following a 2007 expansion project

- Aylesworth
- Central
- Crisman
- Jones
- Kyle
- Myers
- Saylor
- South Haven

The corporation is reviewing the results of a population growth study to determine future facility needs. Current options include: 1) Constructing a ninth elementary school; 2) Constructing a third middle school; or 3) Constructing an intermediate (5th-6th grade) school. For the 2007–2008 school year the Portage Township Schools student enrollment was 8,541.
