= Werner Lassen =

Namibian golfer (born 1974)

Personal information
- Nationality: Namibia
- Born: 1974 (age 51–52)

Career
- Sport: Golf
- Status: Amateur

Werner Lassen (born 1974) is a Namibian amateur golfer. By profession a photocopy machine sales manager, he has appeared in numerous amateur tournaments both within his country and outside of it.

== Bank Windhoek Namibian Open Golf Tournament ==
In May 2007, Lassen won the Bank Windhoek Namibian Open Golf Tournament for a record 10th time in 15 years, beating Andrew Dodds in a sudden death playoff. He holds the record for the most Open victories over Adri Basson (5 time winner).

== International competition ==
Lassen is a member of the Namibian national amateur golf team and competed in the 2006 Eisenhower Trophy amateur golf tournament in Cape Town, South Africa.

== Sources ==
- List of storylines of Eisenhower Trophy (see Namibia)
- Lassen wins Namibian Open after play-off namibiasport.com, 5 May 2007
