= Emil Lassen =

United States Air Force general

Emil Lassen is a former major general in the Air National Guard.

== Career ==
Lassen joined the United States Air Force in 1978 and began training at Columbus Air Force Base in 1979. The following year, he received further training with the 550th Tactical Fighter Training Squadron at Luke Air Force Base before being assigned to the 58th Tactical Fighter Squadron at Eglin Air Force Base. In 1983, he returned to Luke Air Force Base as an instructor with the 555th Tactical Fighter Training Squadron.

Lassen transferred to the Colorado Air National Guard in 1986 and joined the 120th Tactical Fighter Squadron at Buckley Air National Guard Base. He was later assigned to the 140th Wing.

In 1997, Lassen was assigned to the United States Air Forces in Europe at Ramstein Air Base in Germany. During this time, he oversaw Air Reserve Component deployments taking part in Operation Northern Watch. The following year, he became Director of Operations of the Colorado Air National Guard.

Lassen later served as Director of Staff of the Joint Forces of the Colorado National Guard. In 2006, he became the Air National Guard Assistant to the Commander of Air Force Space Command.

As of December 2022, Lassen was employed at the Federal Aviation Administration as a Journeyman Aviation Safety Inspector.

Awards he received during his career include the Legion of Merit, the Meritorious Service Medal, the Air Medal, the Aerial Achievement Medal, the Air Force Commendation Medal, the Air Force Outstanding Unit Award, the Combat Readiness Medal, the National Defense Service Medal, the Southwest Asia Service Medal, the Air Force Overseas Long Tour Service Ribbon, the Air Force Longevity Service Ribbon, the Armed Forces Reserve Medal and the Air Force Training Ribbon.

As a civilian, he would become a pilot in command with United Airlines.

== Education ==
- University of New Mexico
- Air War College
