= Cedar Lake, Indiana =

- Town
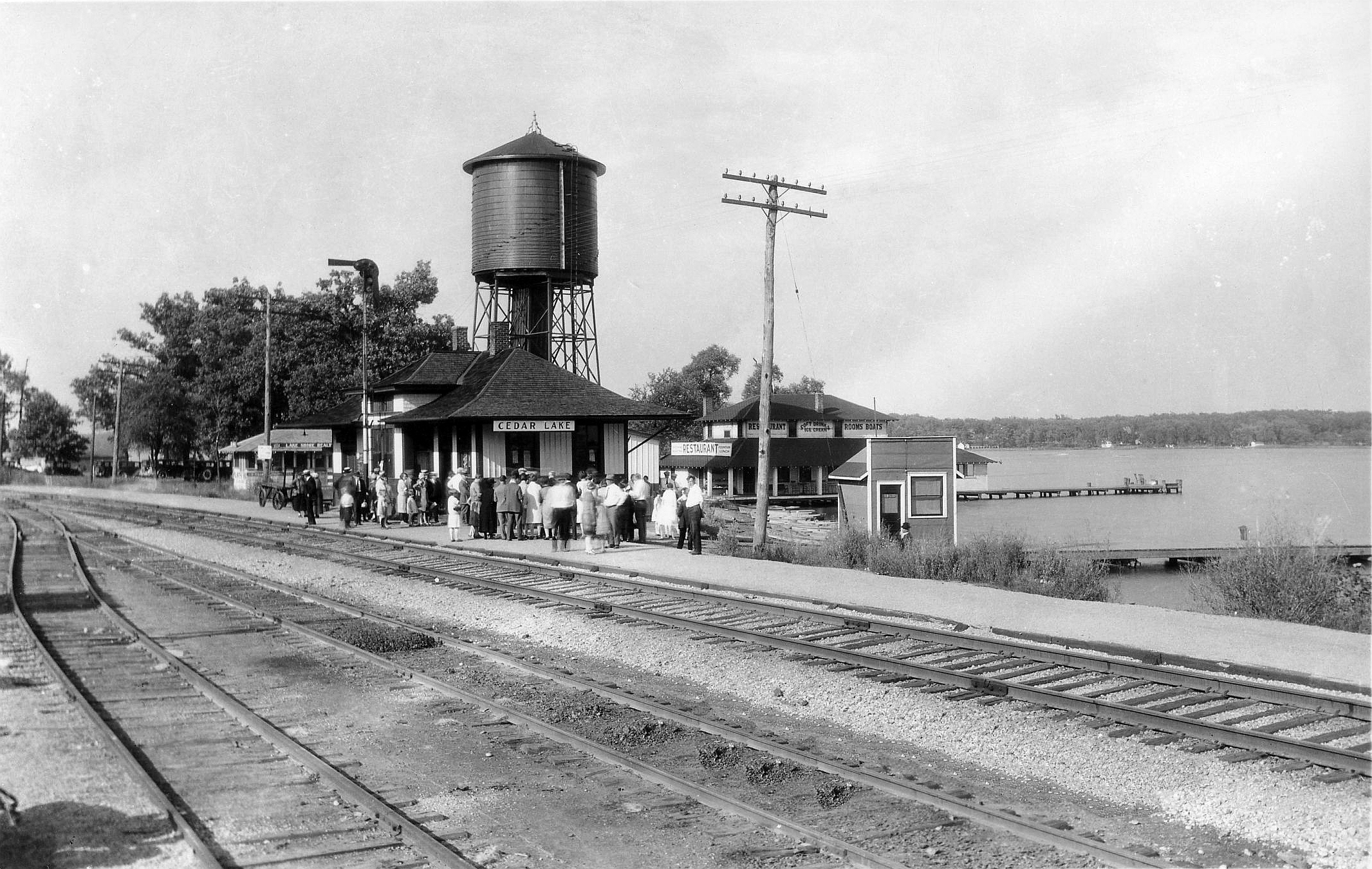
- Railroad Depot and Water Tower (circa 1920s)

- Flag Logo

- Location of Cedar Lake in Lake County, Indiana.

- Location within Indiana
- Coordinates: 41°22′32″N 87°26′25″W
- Country: United States
- State: Indiana
- County: Lake
- Townships: Hanover, Center
- Incorporated: 1967

Government
  - Type: Town Council
  - president: Nicholas “Nick” Recupito

Area
  - Total: 10.17 sq mi (26.34 km^{2})
  - Land: 8.75 sq mi (22.66 km^{2})
  - Water: 1.42 sq mi (3.68 km^{2})
- Elevation: 709 ft (216 m)

Population (2020)
  - Total: 14,106
  - Density: 1,612.4/sq mi (622.56/km^{2})
- Time zone: UTC-6 (CST)
  - Summer (DST): UTC-6 (CST)
- ZIP code: 46303
- Area code: 219
- FIPS code: 18-11062
- GNIS feature ID: 2396634
- Website: cedarlakein.gov

Cedar Lake is a town in Hanover and Center townships, Lake County, Indiana, United States. It is near the Illinois state line. Its population was 14,106 at the 2020 census. The town is notable for its location on Cedar Lake, the Lake of the Red Cedars museum. Cedar Lake is also bordered to Crown Point, Indiana.

== History ==
Cedar Lake was settled by pioneers in the mid-19th century and was originally named West Point; the name “Cedar Lake” belonged to a nearby town that is now called Creston, Indiana. In 1839, the town that was then called West Point competed with the settlements of Liverpool and Lake Court House (later called Crown Point) to be the county seat of Lake County, but lost out to Liverpool. By 1870, the Cedar Lake Post Office was established, giving the area a new name. After the Monon Railroad came to the lake's western shore in 1882, many new residents flocked to the area along with tourists who saw the lake as a resort destination. From the late 19th century to the early 20th century, Cedar Lake was a popular place for Chicagoans looking for a retreat from the city. The lake had over 50 hotels at the time and several pavilions and ballrooms that brought many well-known bands to entertain the visitors.

Cedar Lake Ind bakery and food shop with pier, about 1926

In 1967, Cedar Lake was officially incorporated as a town. The Lassen Hotel and Monon Park Dancing Pavilion are listed in the National Register of Historic Places. Cedar Lake, now a commuter town for Chicago, has been growing in population.

== Geography ==
According to the 2010 census, Cedar Lake has a total area of 9.61 square miles (24.89 km^{2}), of which 8.22 square miles (21.29 km^{2}) (or 85.54%) is land and 1.39 square miles (3.60 km^{2}) (or 14.46%) is water. The lake, which is the largest natural lake in northwest Indiana, appears to have formed from glacial meltwaters. There is an abundance of hills around the lake, which are evidence of the Valparaiso Moraine running through the area.

The 781 acre lake is naturally fed by small streams, storm runoff, and a natural spring. The lake has a median depth of 8.8 feet. Its deepest depth at 16 feet located in the middle basin. The lack of clarity in the water is due to the low refresh rate of the water and the shallow depths combined with the size of the lake. The lake bed is composed mostly of a dirt and sand mixture, clay, and rocks.

== Demographics ==
Historical population
Census	Pop.	Note	%±
1950	3,907		—
1960	5,766		47.6%
1970	7,589		31.6%
1980	8,754		15.4%
1990	8,885		1.5%
2000	9,279		4.4%
2010	11,560		24.6%
2020	14,106		22.0%
U.S. Decennial Census

=== Racial and ethnic composition ===
Cedar Lake town, Indiana – Racial and ethnic composition Note: the US Census treats Hispanic/Latino as an ethnic category. This table excludes Latinos from the racial categories and assigns them to a separate category. Hispanics/Latinos may be of any race.
Race / Ethnicity (NH = Non-Hispanic)	Pop 2000	Pop 2010	Pop 2020	% 2000	% 2010	% 2020
White alone (NH)	8,826	10,563	11,966	95.12%	91.38%	84.83%
Black or African American alone (NH)	7	50	59	0.08%	0.43%	0.42%
Native American or Alaska Native alone (NH)	16	22	22	0.17%	0.19%	0.16%
Asian alone (NH)	19	42	66	0.20%	0.36%	0.47%
Native Hawaiian or Pacific Islander alone (NH)	0	3	3	0.00%	0.03%	0.02%
Other race alone (NH)	7	7	31	0.08%	0.06%	0.22%
Mixed race or Multiracial (NH)	79	119	695	0.85%	1.03%	4.93%
Hispanic or Latino (any race)	325	754	1,264	3.50%	6.52%	8.96%
Total	9,279	11,560	14,106	100.00%	100.00%	100.00%

=== 2020 census ===
As of the 2020 census, Cedar Lake had a population of 14,106. The median age was 38.1 years. 24.8% of residents were under the age of 18 and 14.2% of residents were 65 years of age or older. For every 100 females there were 100.3 males, and for every 100 females age 18 and over there were 99.1 males age 18 and over.

There were 5,356 households in Cedar Lake, of which 34.2% had children under the age of 18 living in them. Of all households, 53.3% were married-couple households, 17.6% were households with a male householder and no spouse or partner present, and 20.7% were households with a female householder and no spouse or partner present. About 24.4% of all households were made up of individuals and 9.3% had someone living alone who was 65 years of age or older.

There were 5,801 housing units, of which 7.7% were vacant. The homeowner vacancy rate was 1.4% and the rental vacancy rate was 5.2%.

97.4% of residents lived in urban areas, while 2.6% lived in rural areas.

=== 2010 census ===
As of the census of 2010, there were 11,560 people, 4,193 households, and 3,002 families living in the town. The population density was 1,406.3 inhabitants per square mile (543.0/km^{2}). There were 4,692 housing units at an average density of 570.8 per square mile (220.4/km^{2}). The racial makeup of the town was 94.9% White, 0.5% African American, 0.3% Native American, 0.4% Asian, 2.4% from other races, and 1.7% from two or more races. Hispanic or Latino of any race were 6.5% of the population.

There were 4,193 households, of which 39.1% had children under the age of 18 living with them, 53.9% were married couples living together, 11.7% had a female householder with no husband present, 6.0% had a male householder with no wife present, and 28.4% were non-families. 22.1% of all households were made up of individuals, and 5.9% had someone living alone who was 65 years of age or older. The average household size was 2.75 and the average family size was 3.23.

The median age in the town was 34.9 years. 26.6% of residents were under the age of 18; 8.7% were between the ages of 18 and 24; 29.3% were from 25 to 44; 26.6% were from 45 to 64; and 8.6% were 65 years of age or older. The gender makeup of the town was 50.7% male and 49.3% female.

=== 2000 census ===
As of the census of 2000, there were 9,279 people, 3,394 households, and 2,450 families living in the town. The population density was 1,366.3 inhabitants per square mile (527.5/km^{2}). There were 3,681 housing units at an average density of 542.0 per square mile (209.3/km^{2}). The racial makeup of the town was 97.40% White, 0.09% African American, 0.24% Native American, 0.20% Asian, 0.88% from other races, and 1.19% from two or more races. Hispanic or Latino of any race were 3.50% of the population.

There were 3,394 households, out of which 37.9% had children under the age of 18 living with them, 57.9% were married couples living together, 10.2% had a female householder with no husband present, and 27.8% were non-families. 22.5% of all households were made up of individuals, and 7.0% had someone living alone who was 65 years of age or older. The average household size was 2.73 and the average family size was 3.23.

In the town, the population was spread out, with 28.5% under the age of 18, 9.2% from 18 to 24, 32.9% from 25 to 44, 20.6% from 45 to 64, and 8.8% who were 65 years of age or older. The median age was 34 years. For every 100 females, there were 104.0 males. For every 100 females age 18 and over, there were 102.3 males.

The median income for a household in the town was $43,987, and the median income for a family was $50,431. Males had a median income of $41,825 versus $24,861 for females. The per capita income for the town was $17,825. About 4.0% of families and 6.6% of the population were below the poverty line, including 6.7% of those under age 18 and 7.4% of those age 65 or over.

== Education ==
Lake County Public Library operates the Cedar Lake Library at 10010 West 133rd Avenue.

Cedar Lake is home to the Hanover Community School Corporation and the Crown Point Community School Corporation. The Hanover School corporation operates two elementary schools: Lincoln and Jane Ball, one middle school: Hanover Central Middle School, and one high school: Hanover Central High School. The Crown Point school corporation operates one elementary school in Cedar Lake: MacArthur. Those in the Crown Point school system attend middle school and high school in Crown Point at Wheeler Middle School and Crown Point High School (CPHS).

== Transportation ==
The Munster/Dyer rail station opened on March 31, 2026.
