= Jan Gerhard Lassen =

Norwegian civil servant and diplomat

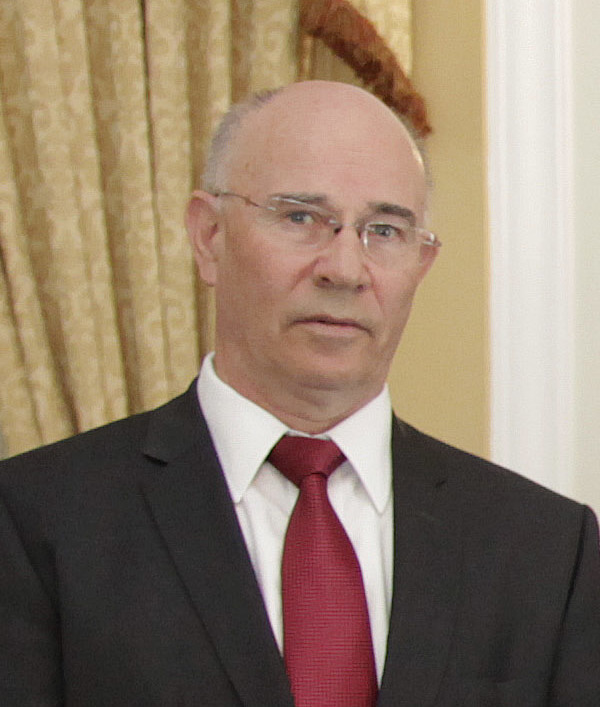
Lassen, 2015

Jan Gerhard Lassen (born 27 July 1949) is a Norwegian civil servant and diplomat.

He holds the cand.polit. degree and was hired in the Ministry of Foreign Affairs in 1980. He was promoted to subdirector in 1997 and head of department in 1998. He served as Norway's ambassador to Brazil from 2003 to 2007, returned as a senior adviser in the Ministry of Foreign Affairs for five years before serving as Norway's ambassador to Guatemala from 2012 to 2017.
