= Christian Riese Lassen =

American painter

Christian Riese Lassen is a Hawaii-based American artist known for marine art. A number of Lassen's paintings use his signature "Two Worlds" composition in which the bottom half of the canvas depicts an underwater scene while the top half depicts terrain, the sky, or outer space. Some of his work features marine life floating in space. Lassen's art became widely popular in Japan in the 1990s. He is notable for his extensive use of licensing and brand partnerships.

== Art career ==
Lassen's art was popular in Japan in the 1990s and used for Sumimoto Bank cash cards and passbooks. In 1996 Masudaya released 'Digiglassen', a jigsaw puzzle video game featuring Lassen's artwork.

In 1998, the United Nations appointed Lassen as a Goodwill Ambassador for the International Year of the Ocean. Along with this, his painting Sanctuary was selected for a United Nations commemorative stamp.

Lassen has made extensive use of image licensing through his company Lassen International Inc. His licensed products included stationary, puzzles, posters and a CD-Rom. In the 1990s, Lassen produced works in a collaboration with Disney Art Editions featuring Disney characters. He has also had licensing deals with Panasonic and American Greetings and painted cars for Lamborghini. In 2002, he had 70 licenses for various products and employed licensing staff to explore new deals.

Lassen had a number of sales galleries, including locations in Las Vegas, and Tokyo.

He has been compared to other 'mass-market art' painters including Thomas Kinkade and Howard Behrens. Sociologist Kashima Takashi has written that "Lassen's works have largely been ignored by art critics." Art critic Peter Plagens has stated of Lassen's work "The colors are horrible to look at. They’re garish, and they have that cheap reproduction kind of look." Japanese art critic Noriyuki Sawaragi has written that Lassen has a poor reputation in the Japanese art world in part because of his aggressive sales tactics.

Lassen was included in the Wall Street Journal article "Shopping-Mall Masters" noting that a price of $300,000 was paid for one of his landscapes.

== Personal life ==
Lassen was born in 1956 in Mendocino, California. He was raised there until age 11 when his family moved to Maui, Hawaii.

In addition to being a painter, Lassen is also an avid surfer. His relationship with the sea influences his artwork.

In 1995, Lassen stated that he owns seven homes in Hawaii. One of these was a $5 million home in Diamond Head, Hawaii.

On October 21, 1998, Lassen released the CD album Turn The Tide in Japan.

In 2021, Lassen was put on probation for burglary and damaging a car.
