= Bank Windhoek Namibian Open Golf Tournament =

Tournament information
- Location: Windhoek, Namibia
- Established: 1935
- Course(s): Windhoek Country Club
- Format: Stroke play, 3 rounds
- Month played: April
- Defunct: No

Current champion
- Francois Hanekom

The Bank Windhoek Namibian Open Golf Tournament is an amateur golf tournament currently held at the Windhoek Country Club in Windhoek, Namibia. The current tournament operation began in 1970 as the South West African Open in 1970, while a tournament in some form has been in operation since 1935. Bank Windhoek has been the official sponsor since 1987.

The FNB Namibian Open, for professionals, was part of the Winter Swing of the Southern Africa Tour between 1995 and 1998.

== Results ==
The most successful player has been Werner Lassen, who has won the tournament a record 10 times, with Adri Basson with five titles, and Francois Hanekom with four, the next most successful.

== Sources ==
- 2007 BANK WINDHOEK GOLF OPEN TOURNAMENT TEES OFF bankwindhoek.com, April 2007
- Lassen wins Namibian Open after play-off namibiasport.com, 5 May 2007
- Hanekom Makes It Look Easy allafrica.com, 7 April 2008
