= Larrison =

Larrison is a surname. Notable people with the surname include:

- Harry Larrison, Jr. (1926–2005), American politician
- Mike Larrison (born 1981), American racing driver
- Preston Larrison (born 1980), American baseball player

== See also ==
- Garrison (name)
- Harrison (name)
