= Ogden Dunes, Indiana =

- Town
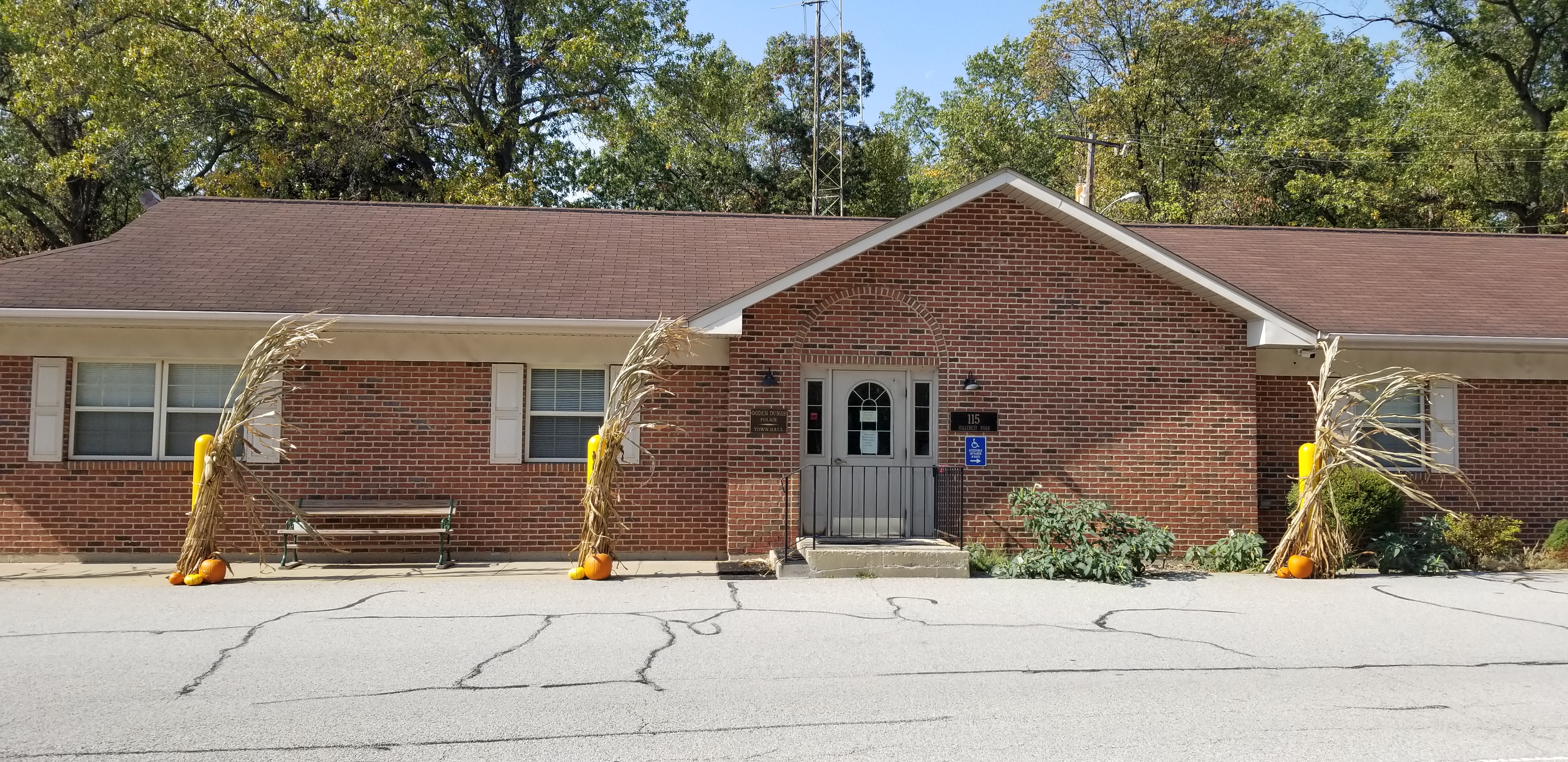
- Town Hall

- Seal

- Location of Ogden Dunes in Porter County, Indiana.
- Coordinates: 41°37′27″N 87°11′37″W
- Country: United States
- State: Indiana
- County: Porter
- Township: Portage

Area
  - Total: 1.46 sq mi (3.78 km^{2})
  - Land: 0.74 sq mi (1.91 km^{2})
  - Water: 0.72 sq mi (1.87 km^{2})
- Elevation: 600 ft (180 m)

Population (2020)
  - Total: 1,168
  - Density: 1,586.5/sq mi (612.54/km^{2})
- Time zone: UTC-6 (Central (CST))
  - Summer (DST): UTC-5 (CDT)
- ZIP code: 46368
- Area code: 219
- FIPS code: 18-56088
- GNIS feature ID: 2396829
- Website: https://ogdendunes.in.gov/

Ogden Dunes is a town in Portage Township, Porter County, Indiana, United States. It is located on the shore of Lake Michigan, within Indiana Dunes National Park and nearly surrounded by the city of Portage. The population was 1,168 as of the 2020 census. It is named for multi-millionaire Francis A. Ogden, who owned the land there before his death in 1914. His main interest in the land where the dunes are was the sand which could be scooped up and sold, with more sand being replenished naturally over time.

Many residents of Ogden Dunes helped preserve parts of the Indiana Dunes.

The town is the site of the Portage / Ogden Dunes station, which is served by South Shore Line passenger trains to and from Chicago. The principal thoroughfare serving the town is U.S. Route 12, which passes along the town's southern edge and connects it to nearby communities such as Gary to the west and Burns Harbor to the east.

Ogden Dunes has been reported as having the highest rate of Lyme disease in Indiana.

== History ==
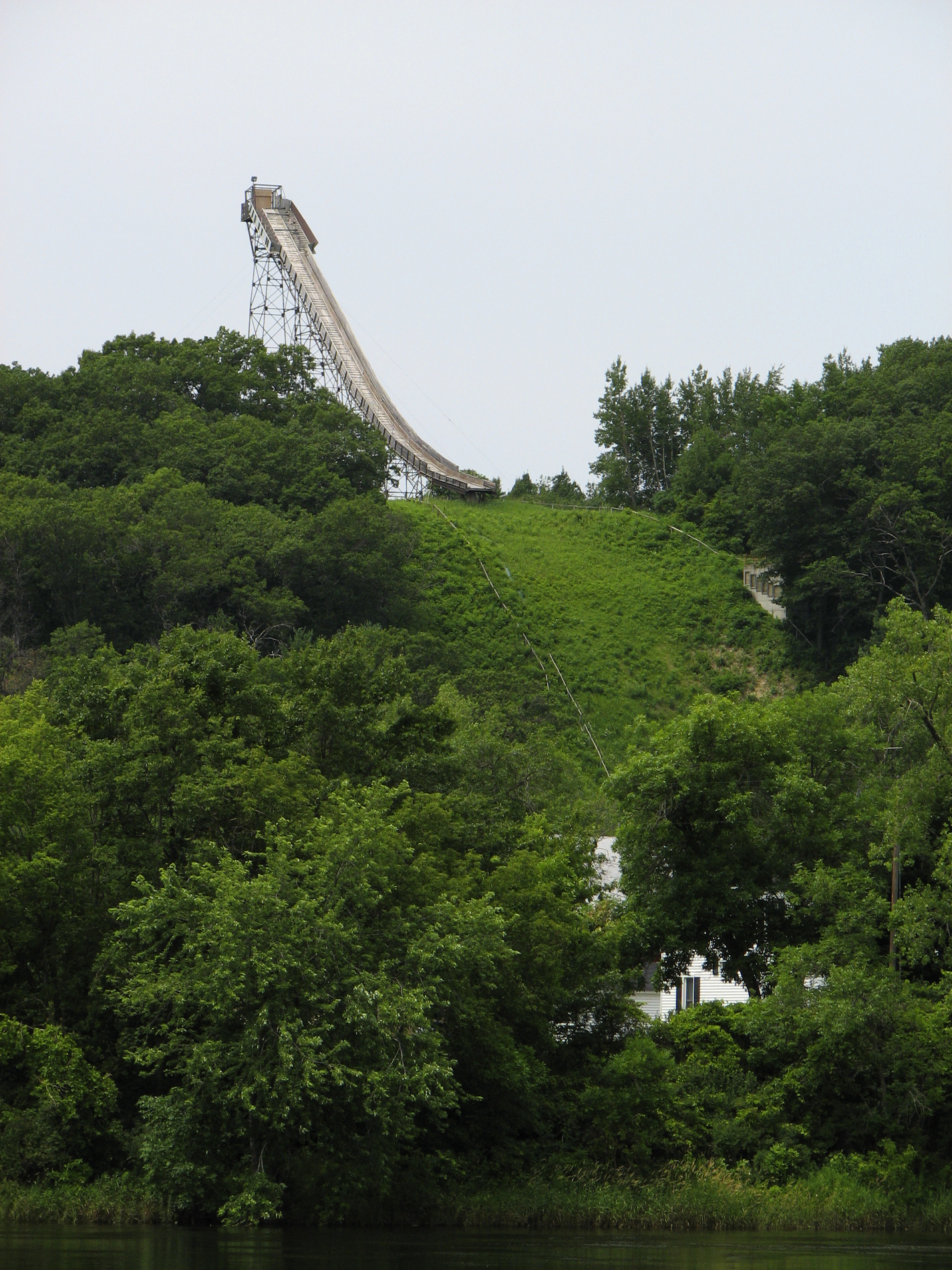
Ogden Dunes Ski-Jump at its Silvermine, Eau Claire, Wisc. location.

Samuel Reck purchased the land from the estate of Francis Ogden in 1923. The town was platted a year later. The town had 50 residents in 1930. By the 1950s, there were almost 800 residents and 1,000 in 1991. The town was incorporated in 1925 to establish long term right of way across the New York Central Railroad tracks. The developers planned to create a resort community with a golf course, clubhouse and hotel. As development lagged, plans were dropped. Sand roads served the community until cinders placed on main street in 1931.

In the later 1920s, Ogden Dunes was noted for having the largest ski jump in the country. International skiing competitions were held on this 30-story high, 500-foot long slide until it was dismantled in 1932. In 1927, the Grand Beach Ski Club, later the Ogden Dunes Ski Club, bought a piece of land on one of the high dunes in the town. They constructed a 192 feet (59 m)-tall ski jump. The first meet was held on January 22, 1928. For the next four years, meets were held in Ogden Dunes. The longest jump ever reported on this structure was 195 feet. In 1932, the Norwegian Olympic Team of Birger Rund, Hans Beck, and Kaare Wahlberg (gold, silver, and bronze medalists) came to Ogden Dunes to try the tower. During the Great Depression the Ski Club had financial setbacks; combined with little snow, the club looked to sell the tower.

- In 1935, a ski club in Rockford, Illinois, purchased the tower and moved it that summer. The Rockford Ski Club built ski jump at along the Kishwaukee River (Rockford Rotary County Forest Preserve) near the end 1920's. It was expanded in 1936 by adding the steel inrun tower from Ogden Dunes.
- Moving the tower was repeated a third time in 1955 when the tower was moved to Eau Claire, Wisconsin and erected at Hendrickson Hill along the Chippewa River in what is now the University of Wisconsin–Eau Claire Campus. In 1968-69 Hendrickson Hill the hill was abandoned and the steel tower was once again dismantled and reassembled in its new location at Silver Mine Hill, 4.5 miles (7.2 km) downstream on the Chippewa River. The ski jump is still used at this site.

Two early houses (11008,11009) on Ski Hill Road are simple yet stylish homes built on the steep and wooded hills of Ogden Dunes. Later structures along the beach include two houses (11001, 11004) that reflect the area's emergence as a fashionable and exclusive residential area in Porter County.

=== Structures of historic significance ===
Notable Houses of Architectural Interest
Location	Architectural Style	Year Built
Shore Drive;	Colonial Revival	c.1930
Cedar Trail;	Spanish Eclectic	c.1930
43 Cedar Trail;	FLW Usonian	c.1939
86 Shore Drive;	Craftsman	c.1925
114 Shore Drive;	French Eclectic	c.1915
18 Sunset Trail;	English Cottage,	c.1930
26 Sunset Trail;	English Cottage	c.1930
3 Sunset Trail;	International	1941
7 Ski Hill Road;	Tudor Revival	c.1930
15 Ski Hill Road;	Spanish Eclectic	c.1925
127 Ogden Road;	English Cottage	c.1925

== Geography ==
According to the 2010 census, Ogden Dunes has a total area of 1.46 square miles (3.78 km^{2}), of which 0.74 square miles (1.92 km^{2}) (or 50.68%) is land and 0.72 square miles (1.86 km^{2}) (or 49.32%) is water.

Ogden Dunes is in Portage Township, Porter County, Indiana. It is an exclusively a residential community. Neighboring Ogden Dunes are several similar enclaves within Indiana Dunes National Park: Miller Beach to the west, Beverly Shores and Dune Acres to the east. Like Ogden Dunes, a considerable portion of the residences in these communities are occupied as summer or weekend homes by Chicagoans.

== Demographics ==
Historical population
Census	Pop.	Note	%±
1930	50		—
1940	144		188.0%
1950	429		197.9%
1960	947		120.7%
1970	1,361		43.7%
1980	1,489		9.4%
1990	1,499		0.7%
2000	1,313		−12.4%
2010	1,110		−15.5%
2020	1,168		5.2%
Source: US Census Bureau

=== 2020 census ===
As of the 2020 census, Ogden Dunes had a population of 1,168. The median age was 56.2 years. 14.0% of residents were under the age of 18 and 33.2% of residents were 65 years of age or older. For every 100 females there were 100.7 males, and for every 100 females age 18 and over there were 98.4 males age 18 and over.

100.0% of residents lived in urban areas, while 0.0% lived in rural areas.

There were 534 households in Ogden Dunes, of which 18.5% had children under the age of 18 living in them. Of all households, 61.0% were married-couple households, 13.9% were households with a male householder and no spouse or partner present, and 21.0% were households with a female householder and no spouse or partner present. About 27.4% of all households were made up of individuals and 18.8% had someone living alone who was 65 years of age or older.

There were 625 housing units, of which 14.6% were vacant. The homeowner vacancy rate was 1.7% and the rental vacancy rate was 0.0%.

Racial composition as of the 2020 census
Race	Number	Percent
White	1,042	89.2%
Black or African American	26	2.2%
American Indian and Alaska Native	3	0.3%
Asian	15	1.3%
Native Hawaiian and Other Pacific Islander	0	0.0%
Some other race	12	1.0%
Two or more races	70	6.0%
Hispanic or Latino (of any race)	60	5.1%

=== 2010 census ===
As of the census of 2010, there were 1,110 people, 508 households, and 335 families residing in the town. The population density was 1,500.0 inhabitants per square mile (579.2/km^{2}). There were 619 housing units at an average density of 836.5 per square mile (323.0/km^{2}). The racial makeup of the town was 96.1% White, 1.1% African American, 0.1% Native American, 1.3% Asian, 0.1% from other races, and 1.4% from two or more races. Hispanic or Latino of any race were 3.2% of the population.

There were 508 households, of which 19.7% had children under the age of 18 living with them, 57.9% were married couples living together, 6.3% had a female householder with no husband present, 1.8% had a male householder with no wife present, and 34.1% were non-families. 27.6% of all households were made up of individuals, and 15.3% had someone living alone who was 65 years of age or older. The average household size was 2.19 and the average family size was 2.67.

The median age in the town was 55.1 years. 15.7% of residents were under the age of 18; 4.9% were between the ages of 18 and 24; 12.2% were from 25 to 44; 41.8% were from 45 to 64; and 25.3% were 65 years of age or older. The gender makeup of the town was 49.7% male and 50.3% female.

=== 2000 census ===
As of the census of 2000, there were 1,313 people, 562 households, and 417 families residing in the town. The population density was 1,798.3 inhabitants per square mile (694.3/km^{2}). There were 627 housing units at an average density of 858.8 per square mile (331.6/km^{2}). The racial makeup of the town was 98.55% White, 0.23% African American, 0.15% Native American, 0.08% Asian, 0.23% from other races, and 0.76% from two or more races. Hispanic or Latino of any race were 2.36% of the population.

There were 562 households, out of which 23.5% had children under the age of 18 living with them, 65.8% were married couples living together, 6.0% had a female householder with no husband present, and 25.8% were non-families. 20.5% of all households were made up of individuals, and 10.0% had someone living alone who was 65 years of age or older. The average household size was 2.34 and the average family size was 2.70.

In the town, the population was spread out, with 18.0% under the age of 18, 3.4% from 18 to 24, 20.6% from 25 to 44, 37.0% from 45 to 64, and 21.0% who were 65 years of age or older. The median age was 49 years. For every 100 females, there were 98.9 males. For every 100 females age 18 and over, there were 98.0 males.

The median income for a household in the town was $76,924, and the median income for a family was $90,719. Males had a median income of $61,111 versus $41,667 for females. The per capita income for the town was $49,852.

== Gallery ==
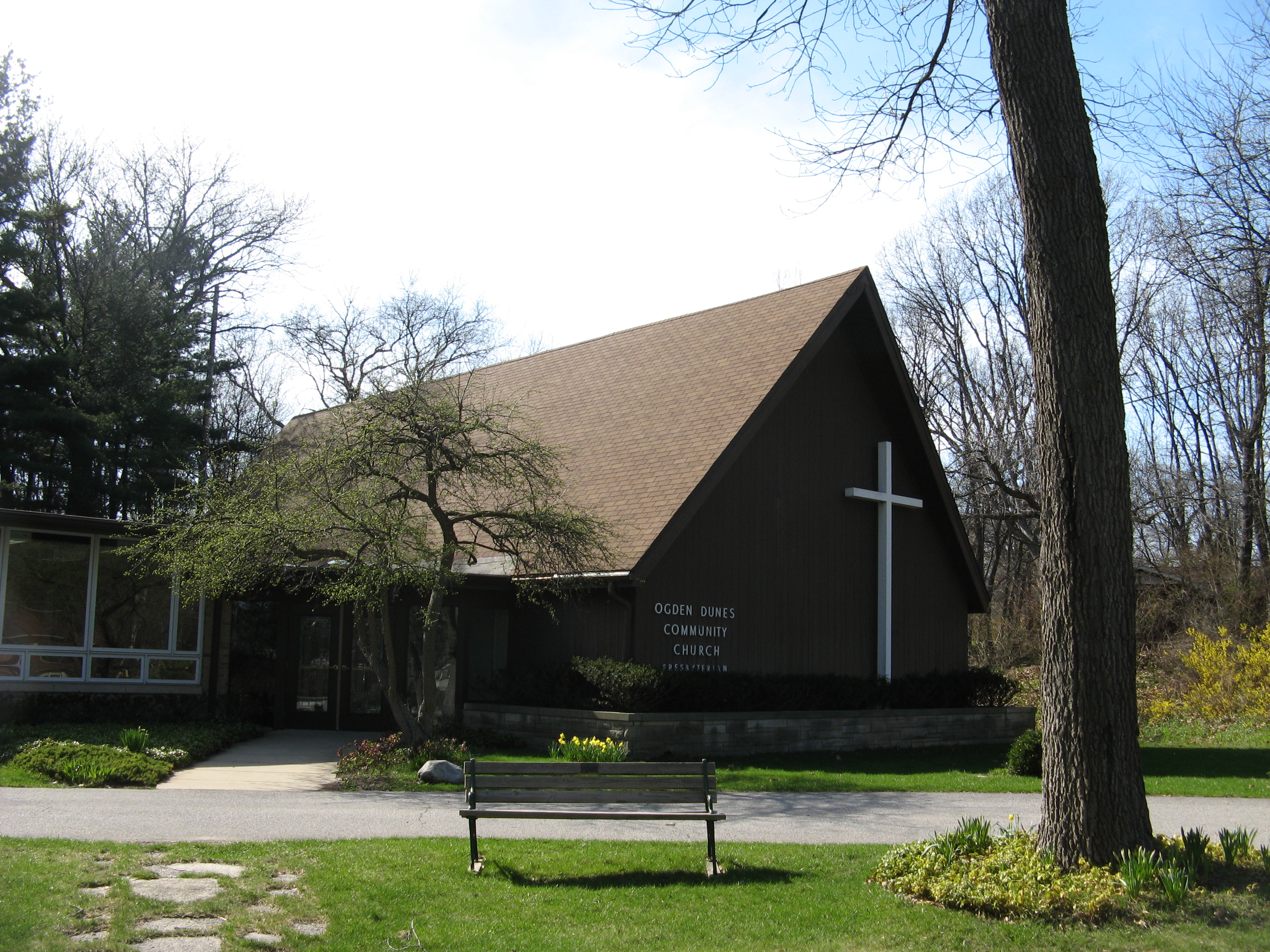
Ogden Dunes Community Church

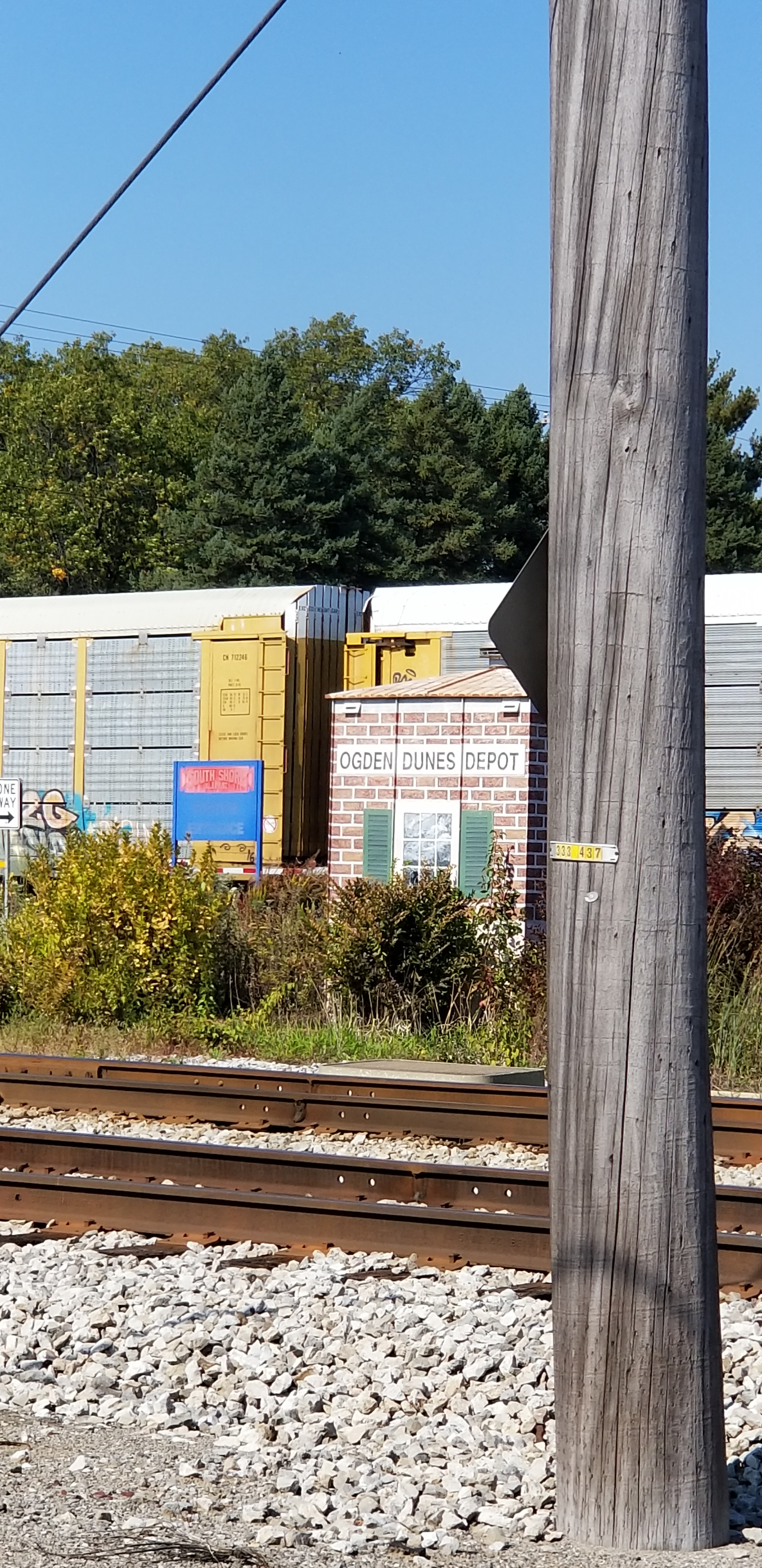
Ogden Dunes Train Depot

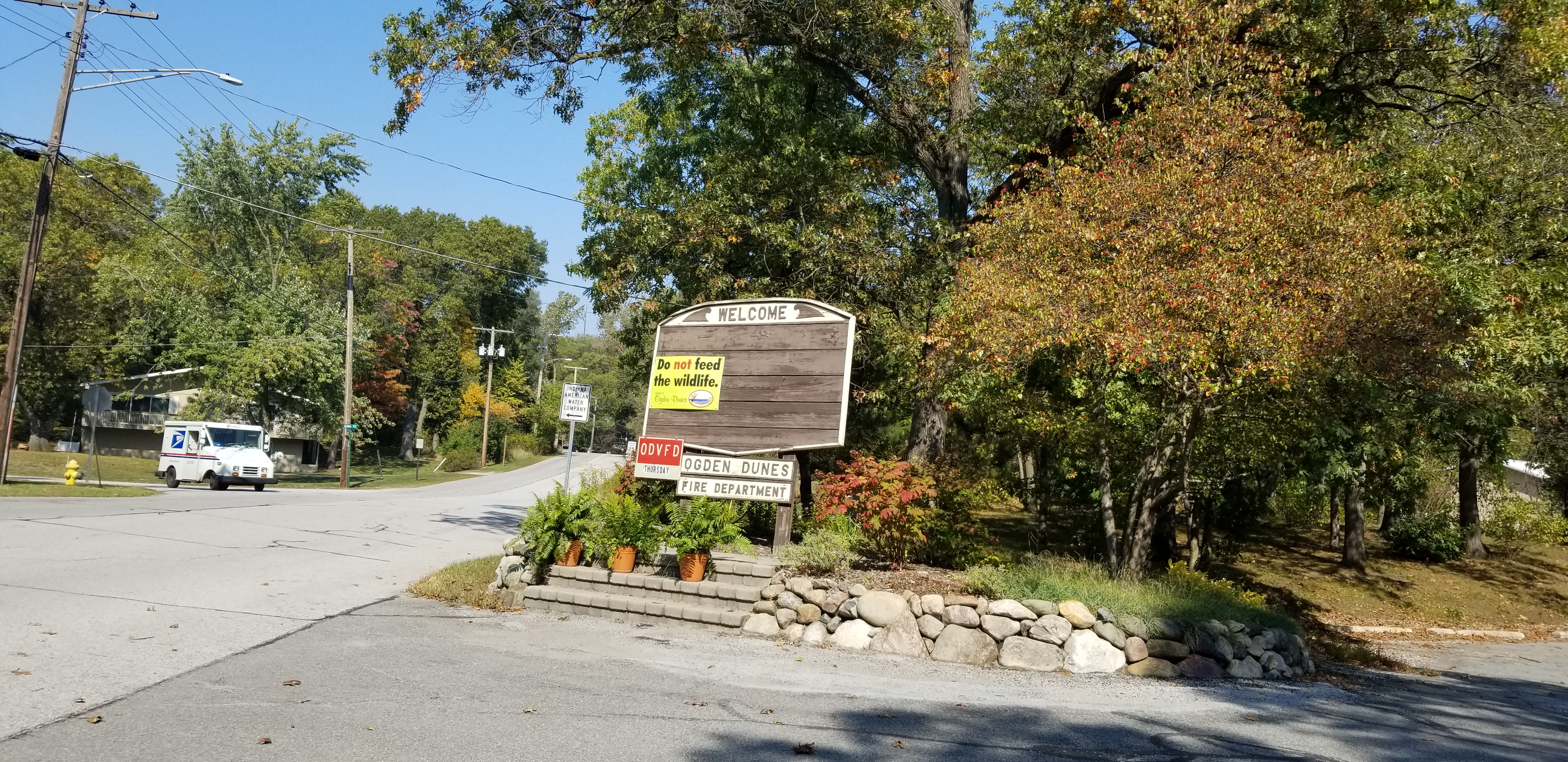
Sign welcoming people to Ogden Dunes
