= South Haven, Indiana =

- Census-designated place
- Location of South Haven in Porter County, Indiana.
- Coordinates: 41°32′27″N 87°08′12″W
- Country: United States
- State: Indiana
- County: Porter
- Township: Portage

Area
  - Total: 1.24 sq mi (3.22 km^{2})
  - Land: 1.24 sq mi (3.22 km^{2})
  - Water: 0 sq mi (0.00 km^{2})
- Elevation: 656 ft (200 m)

Population (2020)
  - Total: 5,084
  - Density: 4,091.0/sq mi (1,579.54/km^{2})
- Time zone: UTC-6 (Central (CST))
  - Summer (DST): UTC-5 (CDT)
- ZIP code: 46385
- Area code: 219
- FIPS code: 18-71288
- GNIS feature ID: 2393241

South Haven is a census-designated place in Portage Township, Porter County, in the U.S. state of Indiana. As of the 2020 census, South Haven had a population of 5,084.

== Geography ==
According to the United States Census Bureau, the village has a total area of 1.2 square miles (3.2 km^{2}), all land.

== Demographics ==
Historical population
Census	Pop.	Note	%±
1970	4,876		—
1980	6,679		37.0%
1990	6,112		−8.5%
2000	5,619		−8.1%
2010	5,282		−6.0%
2020	5,084		−3.7%
Source: US Census Bureau

=== 2020 census ===
As of the 2020 census, South Haven had a population of 5,084. The median age was 37.0 years. 23.9% of residents were under the age of 18 and 14.5% of residents were 65 years of age or older. For every 100 females there were 99.3 males, and for every 100 females age 18 and over there were 94.9 males age 18 and over.

100.0% of residents lived in urban areas, while 0.0% lived in rural areas.

There were 1,902 households in South Haven, of which 34.0% had children under the age of 18 living in them. Of all households, 46.3% were married-couple households, 18.3% were households with a male householder and no spouse or partner present, and 25.7% were households with a female householder and no spouse or partner present. About 23.7% of all households were made up of individuals and 9.5% had someone living alone who was 65 years of age or older.

There were 1,980 housing units, of which 3.9% were vacant. The homeowner vacancy rate was 1.6% and the rental vacancy rate was 3.9%.

Racial composition as of the 2020 census
Race	Number	Percent
White	4,210	82.8%
Black or African American	259	5.1%
American Indian and Alaska Native	10	0.2%
Asian	22	0.4%
Native Hawaiian and Other Pacific Islander	1	0.0%
Some other race	151	3.0%
Two or more races	431	8.5%
Hispanic or Latino (of any race)	676	13.3%

=== 2000 census ===
As of the 2000 census, there were 5,619 people, 1,906 households, and 1,538 families residing in the CDP. The population density was 4,515.3 inhabitants per square mile (1,743.4/km^{2}). There were 1,956 housing units at an average density of 1,571.8 per square mile (606.9/km^{2}). The racial makeup of the CDP was 96.85% White, 0.37% African American, 0.23% Native American, 0.25% Asian, 1.05% from other races, and 1.25% from two or more races. Hispanic or Latino of any race were 6.16% of the population.

There were 1,906 households, out of which 39.8% had children under the age of 18 living with them, 64.8% were married couples living together, 11.6% had a female householder with no husband present, and 19.3% were non-families. 15.0% of all households were made up of individuals, and 5.5% had someone living alone who was 65 years of age or older. The average household size was 2.95 and the average family size was 3.26.

In the CDP, the population was spread out, with 29.1% under the age of 18, 9.5% from 18 to 24, 31.0% from 25 to 44, 23.0% from 45 to 64, and 7.4% who were 65 years of age or older. The median age was 33 years. For every 100 females, there were 95.4 males. For every 100 females age 18 and over, there were 94.5 males.

The median income for a household in the CDP was $52,583, and the median income for a family was $54,875. Males had a median income of $41,003 versus $23,283 for females. The per capita income for the CDP was $18,112. About 3.2% of families and 5.8% of the population were below the poverty line, including 6.7% of those under age 18 and 6.8% of those age 65 or over.

=== Community ===
South Haven is unincorporated Porter County. They are part of the Portage School System, have a Valparaiso, IN address. They do not have a vote in Valparaiso or Portage city elections. The area has a Wheeler-based phone number. Police service is provided by Porter County. The county is also responsible for street repairs and snow removal.

South Haven also has a Little League field. Divisions are Minors, Majors and Senior Leagues. South Haven also has a Boy's and Girl's Club. All of the stores and restaurants are located on U.S. Hwy 6.

== Education ==
South Haven has a public library, a branch of the Porter County Public Library System.

South Haven has 2 Elementary schools (K-5). Paul Saylor Elementary and South Haven Elementary. They are part of the Portage Township Schools.
