= Leigh Lassen =

American actress

- Occupation: Television actress

Leigh Lassen is an American actress, best known for her role as Patti Tate on the soap opera Search for Tomorrow, from 1968 to 1976. While the ninth actress to play the role, she is one of the actresses who is most closely identified with it. She was born in New York City.

Lassen married actor Terry Logan. Her mother, Sigrid Lassen, was a society singer in the 1930s, whilst her grandmother was Ketto Mikeladze, a Georgian princess who appeared in the Ziegfeld Follies.
