= Lassen Hotel (Cedar Lake, Indiana) =

- U.S. National Register of Historic Places
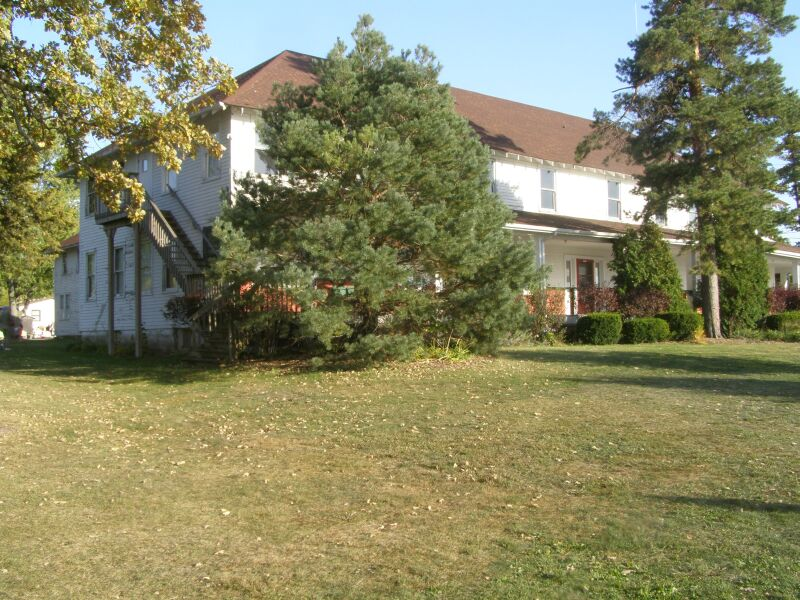
- Lassen Hotel, September 2012

- Location within Indiana Location within the United States
- Location: 7808 W. 138th Pl., Cedar Lake, Indiana
- Coordinates: 41°22′6″N 87°25′30″W
- Area: 1 acre (0.40 ha)
- Built: 1890, 1920
- NRHP reference No.: 81000019
- Added to NRHP: July 7, 1981

Lassen Hotel is a historic hotel building located at 7808 West 138th Place in Cedar Lake, Indiana. It is a two-story, T-shaped frame building sheathed in clapboard. It has a hipped roof and features a wraparound verandah overlooking Cedar Lake. The eastern section of the building was built about 1890. It was moved to its present location during mid-winter of 1919 and the lakefront section was built onto it in 1920. Its grand opening was on May 7, 1921. It is home to the Red Cedars Lake History Museum, now the Museum at Lassen's Resort on Cedar Lake. A restoration project was underway in 2013. It was listed in the National Register of Historic Places in 1981.
