= Portage, Indiana =

- City
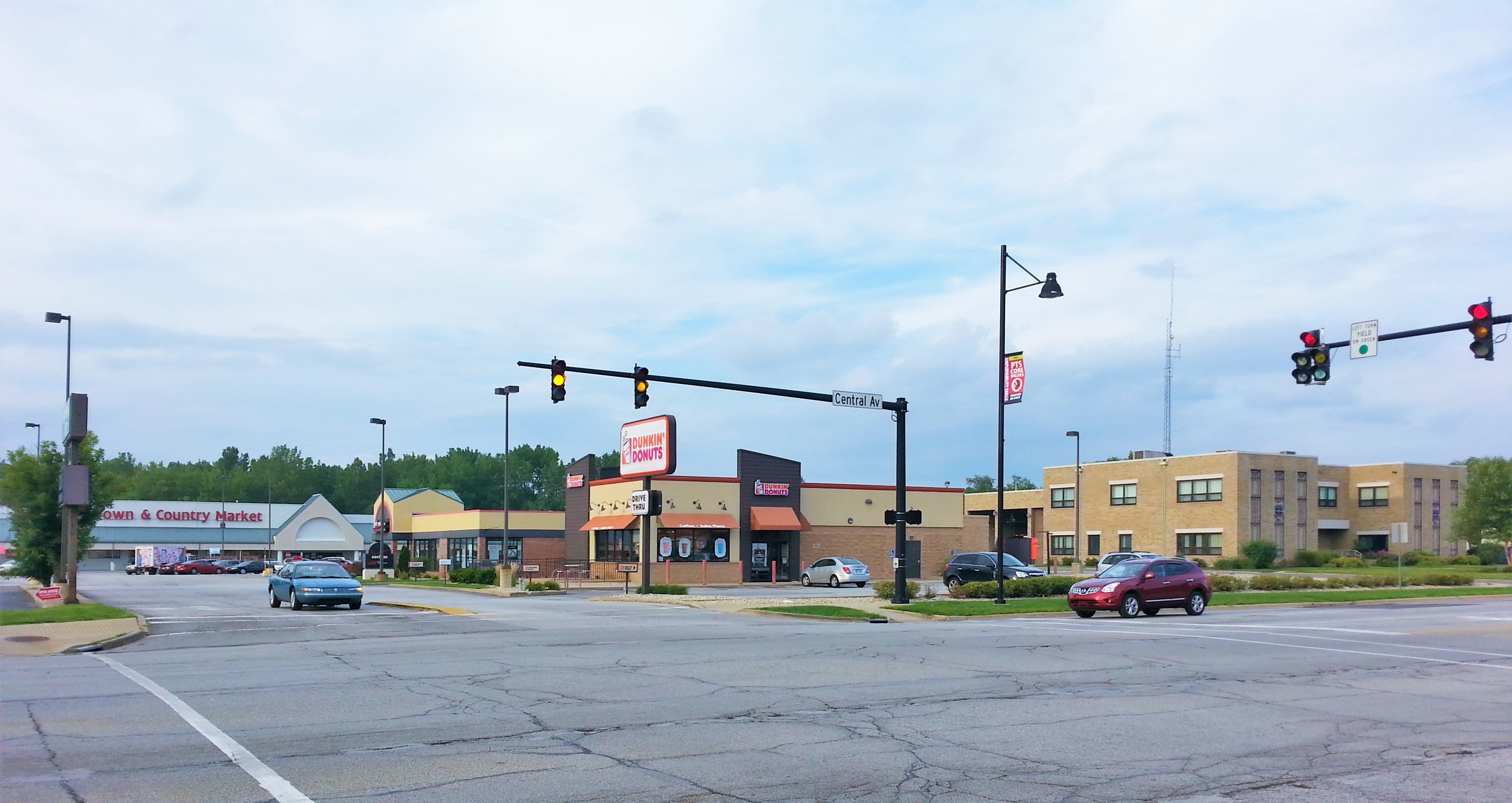
- Downtown Portage in 2016

- Flag Seal
- Nickname(s): The Port City, The Port of Opportunity
- Interactive map of Portage, Indiana
- Location within Indiana Location within the United States
- Coordinates: 41°36′20″N 87°10′12″W
- Country: United States
- State: Indiana
- County: Porter
- Townships: Portage, Westchester
- Established: 1967

Government
  - Type: Strong Mayor-Council
  - Mayor: Austin Bonta (R)
  - Clerk-Treasurer: Elizabeth Modesto (D)
  - City Council: Members: Melissa A. Weidenbach (R, AL); Ferdinand Alvarez (D, AL); Gina Giese-Hurst (D, 1st); Bob Parnell (R, 2nd); Victoria Gresham (R, 3rd); Penny Ambler (R, 4th); Collin Czilli (D, 5th)

Area
  - Total: 27.64 sq mi (71.60 km^{2})
  - Land: 25.55 sq mi (66.17 km^{2})
  - Water: 2.10 sq mi (5.43 km^{2})
- Elevation: 633 ft (193 m)

Population (2020)
  - Total: 37,926
  - Density: 1,484.4/sq mi (573.13/km^{2})
- Time zone: UTC−6 (CST)
  - Summer (DST): UTC−5 (CDT)
- ZIP code: 46368
- Area code: 219
- FIPS code: 18-61092
- GNIS feature ID: 2396254
- Website: www.portagein.gov

Historical population
Census	Pop.	Note	%±
1950	2,116		—
1960	11,822		458.7%
1970	19,127		61.8%
1980	27,409		43.3%
1990	29,060		6.0%
2000	33,496		15.3%
2010	36,828		9.9%
2020	37,926		3.0%
Source: US Census Bureau

Portage (/ˈpɔːrtɪdʒ/ POR-tij) is a city in Porter County, Indiana, United States. The population was 37,926 as of the 2020 census. It is the largest city in Porter County and third largest in Northwest Indiana. Portage lies within Portage and Westchester townships, on the border with Lake County, Indiana.

== History ==
=== Pre-European settlement ===
Prior to European settlement, Native Americans lived in Northwest Indiana. Mound Builders left a mound in the area now known as McCool, though the mound was destroyed in the early 1900s. Following the Mound Builders, the Wea tribe inhabited the area. The Wea were forced south by the Potawatomi.

=== Early explorers and settlers ===
Jacques Marquette, Louis Jolliet, Louis Hennepin or François Pétis de la Croix may have explored the area. Potawatomi chief, Leopold Pokagon, encouraged his tribe to sell tribal lands to European settlers. In 1812, Garyton became one of the first communities in Portage Township.

Samuel Putnam Robbins was among the first settlers, coming from Hocking County, Ohio, and he settled near modern-day Robbins Road between McCool Road and Indiana Highway 149. In 1834, Joseph Wolf squatted on land currently near the modern-day community of South Haven and operated dairy and beef farms there. Other early settlers included Berret Door, Reuben Hurlburt, Wilford Parrott, the Spurloch brothers, William McCool, Benjamin James (and his son, Allen James), and William Holmes. Jacob Blake arrived in Portage in 1833.

=== Early communities ===
Before Portage became a town, it consisted primarily of three separate communities in addition to much farmland. They were named McCool, Crisman and Garyton. In 1950, those communities only had 2,116 residents. La Porte County maintained jurisdiction over Porter County in 1835, and founded Portage Township that year.

=== Railroads ===
Portage Township was primarily a farming community until railroad development began in the 1850s and 1860s. The first railroad to build in the area was the Michigan Central, completed in 1852. The Michigan Central connected Detroit to Chicago. This enabled local farmers to easily ship livestock, dairy and crops to Chicago and any other stop along the way. It was a boon to the farmers of the area at the time and enabled them to buy more land for farming. The Michigan Central was later bought by the New York Central Railroad.

The next railroad to build through the Portage area was the Baltimore and Ohio in 1874. This railroad crossed the Michigan Central at Willow Creek, near the village of Crisman. The Willow Creek Confrontation occurred in 1874, when the Michigan Central refused to allow the Baltimore and Ohio to cross its track. The situation was eventually resolved peacefully, and a crossing was made. Sand was also an industry in Portage due to demand in the growing city of Chicago. The railroads enabled sand to be delivered to Chicago more efficiently.

=== Depression era and the world wars ===
Between the 1870s and the depression era, Portage did not grow very much. It has been estimated that between 1880 and 1950, the growth rate averaged only about 64 people per year. This is despite the growth of towns to the west such as Gary, Hammond and East Chicago due to the industrialization of steel mills. Portage was not unaffected by the Great Depression. Due to the steel mills being in economic trouble, the farmers of Portage did not have demand to produce their products. As a result of this, the farmers had food, but no money. Many even lost their farms.

Like with many communities in the country, World Wars I and II affected the economy of Portage in a big way. Steel mills geared into high production and labor was in high demand, thus drawing many people to the area.

=== Post-World War II ===
After the war, the economy remained strong because of the high demand for automobiles and appliances, for both of which the steel was produced at the steel mills. The population of post-war Portage grew very quickly. In the early 1950s, people came from Kentucky, southern Indiana and Illinois. Most were seeking the steady salary available in the steel mills and related industries.

National Steel opened a plant along the shore of Lake Michigan in Portage in 1959. This brought in about 1,600 new jobs. The Port of Indiana was also built in 1961 to accommodate trade with the world via Lake Michigan. In 1963, Bethlehem Steel began construction of a plant which was located partly in Portage. This project brought about 6,000 jobs to the area.

In 1959, Portage was incorporated as a town. Ogden Dunes and South Haven were excluded because the residents of these areas did not wish to be included in the town. Due to the surge of population after the war, many farmers were selling land to be subdivided into lots for families to build homes. In 1967, Portage officially became a city. During the 1950s and 1960s, the city of Gary began to experience white flight. Portage saw an influx of white residents from Gary seeking to escape racial integration.

Portage is still a heavily industrial city. While primarily dependent on the steel industry, the 1980s brought a decline in the steel industry. As a result, C.O.I.L. (the Community Organization on Industrial Location) was formed. This organization promotes diversified industry in the area. They have had part in developing the Coca-Cola bottling plant and further development of the Port of Indiana. Very few farms are still active in the Portage area. However, many original descendants of founding families are still in the area.

Portage has seen many new green technology industries locate to the community since the early 2000s including Fronius USA. In 2016, the City opened a new police station and Fire Station in the downtown corridor. The new police station is triple the size of the former station on Irving Street.

== Politics ==
Mayors of Portage, IN
Name	Term	Party	Notes
Arthur Olson	1968-1972	Democrat	
Robert Goin	1972-1980	Republican	
John Williams	1980-1984	Democrat	
Robert Goin	1984-1988	Republican	
Samuel Maletta	1988-2000	Democrat	
Doug Olson	2000-2008	Democrat	Son of Portage's first mayor.
Olga Velazquez	2008-2012	Democrat	
James Snyder	2012-2019*	Republican	In early 2019 Snyder was convicted of felony charges, causing him to vacate office. The conviction was overturned by the U.S. Supreme Court on June 26, 2024, in Snyder v. United States.
John Cannon	2019-2020*	Republican	In March 2019 Cannon won the Republican caucus and became mayor for the remainder of Snyder's elected term.
Suzanne Lynch	2020–2024	Democrat	
Austin Bonta	2024–Present	Republican	

== Geography ==
According to the 2010 census, Portage has a total area of 27.614 square miles (71.52 km^{2}), of which 25.63 square miles (66.38 km^{2}) (or 92.82%) is land and 1.984 square miles (5.14 km^{2}) (or 7.18%) is water.

== Demographics ==
=== 2020 census ===
As of the 2020 census, Portage had a population of 37,926. The median age was 39.1 years. 22.6% of residents were under the age of 18 and 16.1% of residents were 65 years of age or older. For every 100 females there were 93.7 males, and for every 100 females age 18 and over there were 91.3 males age 18 and over.

99.0% of residents lived in urban areas, while 1.0% lived in rural areas.

There were 14,767 households in Portage, of which 31.6% had children under the age of 18 living in them. Of all households, 44.5% were married-couple households, 19.0% were households with a male householder and no spouse or partner present, and 28.1% were households with a female householder and no spouse or partner present. About 26.3% of all households were made up of individuals and 10.3% had someone living alone who was 65 years of age or older.

There were 15,600 housing units, of which 5.3% were vacant. The homeowner vacancy rate was 1.5% and the rental vacancy rate was 5.6%.

Racial composition as of the 2020 census
Race	Number	Percent
White	26,260	69.2%
Black or African American	4,456	11.7%
American Indian and Alaska Native	199	0.5%
Asian	393	1.0%
Native Hawaiian and Other Pacific Islander	19	0.1%
Some other race	2,083	5.5%
Two or more races	4,516	11.9%
Hispanic or Latino (of any race)	7,192	19.0%

=== 2010 census ===
As of the census of 2010, there were 36,828 people, 13,992 households, and 9,751 families living in the city. The population density was 1,436.9 inhabitants per square mile (554.8/km^{2}). There were 14,807 housing units at an average density of 577.7 per square mile (223.1/km^{2}). The racial makeup of the city was 83.6% White, 7.3% African American, 0.4% Native American, 0.9% Asian, 5.2% from other races, and 2.6% from two or more races. Hispanic or Latino of any race were 16.4% of the population.

There were 13,992 households, of which 36.3% had children under the age of 18 living with them, 49.0% were married couples living together, 14.6% had a female householder with no husband present, 6.1% had a male householder with no wife present, and 30.3% were non-families. 24.3% of all households were made up of individuals, and 9% had someone living alone who was 65 years of age or older. The average household size was 2.61 and the average family size was 3.10.

The median age in the city was 36.4 years. 25.7% of residents were under the age of 18; 8.5% were between the ages of 18 and 24; 27.5% were from 25 to 44; 26.2% were from 45 to 64; and 12.1% were 65 years of age or older. The gender makeup of the city was 48.4% male and 51.6% female.

=== 2000 census ===
As of the census of 2000, there were 33,496 people, 12,746 households, and 9,011 families living in the city. The population density was 1,315.8 inhabitants per square mile (508.0/km^{2}). There were 13,375 housing units at an average density of 525.4 per square mile (202.9/km^{2}). The racial makeup of the city was 92.52% White, 1.45% African American, 0.27% Native American, 0.64% Asian, 0.06% Pacific Islander, 3.20% from other races, and 1.86% from two or more races. Hispanic or Latino of any race were 9.94% of the population.

There were 12,746 households, out of which 34.7% had children under the age of 18 living with them, 53.7% were married couples living together, 12.2% had a female householder with no husband present, and 29.3% were non-families. 23.9% of all households were made up of individuals, and 9.1% had someone living alone who was 65 years of age or older. The average household size was 2.60 and the average family size was 3.09.

In the city, the population was spread out, with 26.0% under the age of 18, 9.4% from 18 to 24, 29.9% from 25 to 44, 22.8% from 45 to 64, and 11.8% who were 65 years of age or older. The median age was 35 years. For every 100 females, there were 94.2 males. For every 100 females age 18 and over, there were 91.0 males.

The median income for a household in the city was $47,500, and the median income for a family was $54,316. Males had a median income of $46,224 versus $25,428 for females. The per capita income for the city was $20,146. About 5.8% of families and 7.5% of the population were below the poverty line, including 10.6% of those under age 18 and 5.6% of those age 65 or over.

== Transportation ==
The commercial airport nearest Portage is the Gary/Chicago International Airport in Gary. Chicago's O'Hare International Airport and Chicago Midway International Airport are also in close proximity and provide the bulk of flights servicing Portage.

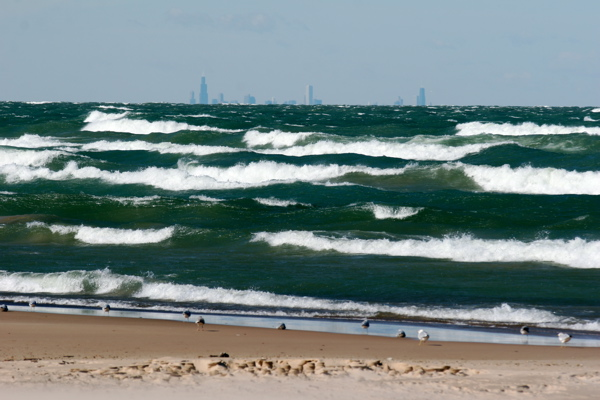
The Chicago skyline as viewed from the Portage Lake Michigan skyline

Coach USA's Airport SuperSaver service stopped at Central & Irving intersection, connecting Portage to Chicago's airports and several other northern Indiana cities and town. Riders used to take westbound buses to Highland, Crestwood and O'Hare and Midway Airport and eastbound buses to Michigan City, South Bend and Notre Dame. Eastbound buses to Michigan City ran every hour while eastbound buses to South Bend and Notre Dame ran every two hours. Coach USA ceased all operations of its Indiana Airport SuperSaver service effective January 1, 2020.

Portage is also connected to Chicago, Illinois and South Bend, Indiana by the South Shore Line. Passengers can board the train at the Portage/Ogden Dunes Station, which is located immediately east of Ogden Dunes in Portage.

Portage is intersected by several major highways, including Interstate 94 and Interstates 80/90 (Indiana Toll Road) as well as U.S. Route 6, U.S. Route 12, U.S. Route 20, and Indiana 149 and Indiana 249.

Also located on the shores of Lake Michigan is the Port of Indiana.

== Education ==
=== Public schools ===
The Portage Township School system comprises 11 public schools: 8 elementary schools (grades K–5), 2 middle schools (grades 6–8), and one senior high school (grades 9–12). Portage Township Schools is an Indiana Exemplary District and has two Four Star schools in the district.

Elementary Schools	Middle Schools	Senior High School
Aylesworth	Fegely	Portage High School
Central	Willowcreek	
Crisman		
Jones		
Kyle		
Myers		
Saylor		
South Haven		

=== Private schools ===
There are two private schools in Portage:

- Portage Christian School – A Christian school servicing children in grades Pre-K–12
- Nativity of Our Savior School – A Roman Catholic school servicing children in grades Pre-K–8

There was a third private school, Maranatha Christian Academy, but it is now closed.

=== Public library ===
Portage has a public library, a branch of the Porter County Public Library System.

== Local media ==
=== Newspapers ===
- The Times of Northwest Indiana (or NWI Times), was founded in 1906 and is the second largest of Indiana's 76 daily newspapers.
- The Post-Tribune of Northwest Indiana was founded in 1907, serving the Northwest Indiana region. The Post-Tribune is owned by the Sun Times Media Group.

=== Magazines ===
- Shore Magazine is a magazine produced by the NWI Times, which also produces ShoreLines, a weekly newsletter.

=== Websites ===
- PortageLife.com, a website launched in early 2010, which publishes information about community and city events and initiatives for Portage, Indiana.
- Greater Portage Chamber of Commerce Website is a website provided by the Greater Portage Chamber of commerce for residents living, visiting, or moving to Portage.

== Notable people ==
- Darren Elkins (born 1984), Indiana State Champion wrestler; professional mixed martial artist for the UFC's Featherweight Division
- Gable Steveson (born 2000), professional wrestler, former NFL player for the Bills, former WWE star. 2x NCAA division one national champion. Most notably winning the 2020 Olympic Games at freestyle wrestling at Heavyweight (125 kg)
