= Larson =

Larson may refer to:

== People and fictional characters ==
- Larson (footballer), full name Larson Torna Ferreira dos Santos, Brazilian footballer
- Larson (surname)

== Places in the United States ==
- Larson, North Dakota, United States, a census-designated place and former city
- Larson Creek, Oregon, United States
- Larson Crag, Victoria Land, Antarctica
- Larson Nunataks, Queen Elizabeth Land, Antarctica
- Larson Valley, Ellsworth Land, Antarctica

== Military ==
- Larson Air Force Base, Moses Lake, Washington, a former United States Air Force base
- USS Everett F. Larson, the name of two United States Navy ships, one proposed but never built

== Other uses ==
- Larson D-1, an agricultural biplane first flown in 1955

== See also ==
- Larson Site, a prehistoric archaeological site in Fulton County, Illinois, United States
- Larsen (disambiguation)
- Larsson
- Larsons Landing
