= Larsen =

Larsen may refer to:

== People ==
- Larsen (surname)
- Larsen Jensen (born 1985), American swimmer
- Larsen Marape (born 1986), Papua New Guinea rugby league footballer
- Larsen Thompson (born 2000), American actress, model, and dancer
- Larsen Touré (Born 1984), Guinean professional footballer

== Geography ==
- Larsen Bay, in Alaska, United States
- Larsen Channel, in Antarctica
- Larsen Ice Shelf, in Antarctica
- Larsen Islands, in Antarctica
- Larsen, Wisconsin, in United States
- Cape Larsen and Larsen Bay in American Samoa

== Other ==
- "Larsen", song by Zazie
- Larsen effect, special kind of feedback which occurs when a loop exists between an audio input and an audio output
- Larsen syndrome, a rare congenital disorder of affecting joints and facial features
- Larsen & Toubro, an Indian engineering and construction conglomerate

== See also ==
- Larson (disambiguation)
- Larsson

== Distinguish from ==
- Larceny, a form of theft
