= List of tornadoes in the outbreak and derecho of June 9–11, 2026 =

From June 9–11, 2026, a major tornado outbreak and derecho affected the Northern Plains, Upper Midwest and Ohio Valley.

== Confirmed tornadoes ==
Daily statistics
Date	Total	EFU	EF0	EF1	EF2	EF3	EF4	EF5	Deaths	Injuries
June 9	7	4	1	1	0	1	0	0	0	0
June 10	26	3	15	7	1	0	0	0	0	0
June 11	69	13	19	30	4	3	0	0	0	17
Total	102	20	35	38	5	4	0	0	0	17

=== June 9 event ===
List of confirmed tornadoes – Tuesday, June 9, 2026 (Note: All dates are based on the local time zone where the tornado touched down; however, all times are in Coordinated Universal Time for consistency.)
EF#	Location	Region	State/Province	Start coord.	Time (UTC)	Path length	Max. width
EF0	Western Grand Ledge	Eaton	MI	42.726°N 84.781°W	14:30–14:37	3.21 mi (5.17 km)	50 yd (46 m)
EF0	Trees were damaged, a storage outbuilding was destroyed, and some additional minor property damage occurred, mainly due to fallen trees.						
EF1	Eastern Freeland	Saginaw	MI	43.5229°N 84.1094°W	17:11–17:14	1.43 mi (2.30 km)	100 yd (91 m)
EF1	This tornado touched down in Freeland, damaging up to forty homes and several commercial buildings. Tree and outbuilding damage were observed along the path, along with several recreational vehicles that were flipped and moved.						
EFU	NE of Montrose	Genesee	MI	43.21°N 83.85°W	17:19	0.1 mi (0.16 km)	10 yd (9.1 m)
EFU	A tornado was observed over farmland by a storm spotter. No damage occurred.						
EFU (Note: The NTP rating for a tornado that does no known damage is EF0-default, which is equivalent to EFU on the American EF Scale.)	SW of St-Pierre-Jolys	De Salaberry	MB	49.38°N 97.14°E	20:40	Unknown	Unknown
EFU	This tornado caused no damage.						
EFU	N of Ste. Anne	Taché	MB	49.715°N 96.65°E	00:15	Unknown	Unknown
EFU	A tornado was recorded. No damage occurred.						
EFU	ESE of Noonan	Divide	ND	48.8802°N 102.9438°W	00:20–00:22	0.25 mi (0.40 km)	50 yd (46 m)
EFU	This brief tornado was reported by a storm chaser.						
EF3	E of North Portal to S of Oxbow	Coalfields, Enniskillen	SK	49°N 102.4565°E	00:55–?	20 mi (32 km)	610 yd (560 m)
EF3	This intense tornado tracked northeast primarily across rural land but still caused significant damage to a farmstead where a home and an outbuilding were destroyed. Grain bins, multiple vehicles, and trees were also damaged, while additional damage along the path included snapped power poles, damage to a pump jack at a battery site, and scattered tree and minor structural damage. Damage continued to the U.S. border, but the extent of the tornado's path into North Dakota could not be surveyed.						

=== June 10 event ===
List of confirmed tornadoes – Wednesday, June 10, 2026
EF#	Location	Region	State/Province	Start coord.	Time (UTC)	Path length	Max. width
EFU	NE of Henry	Codington	SD	44.88°N 97.46°W	05:06	0.05 mi (0.080 km)	1 yd (0.91 m)
EFU	A brief tornado caused no damage.						
EFU	NE of Sunburg	Kandiyohi	MN	45.41°N 95.17°W	07:07		
EFU	A tornado was recorded. No damage occurred.						
EF0	Lomira	Dodge	WI	43.591°N 88.4501°W	20:01–20:02	0.72 mi (1.16 km)	75 yd (69 m)
EF0	Several homes and mobile homes sustained roof damage. Trees were also damaged, including a few that were uprooted.						
EF0	SE of Maple Park	Kane	IL	41.8818°N 88.5594°W	20:01–20:03	1.35 mi (2.17 km)	50 yd (46 m)
EF0	This tornado severely damaged an outbuilding at a family farm and snapped several small trees on the property. Afterwards, a large pole barn was damaged at a winery.						
EF0	SSE of Eden	Fond du Lac	WI	43.6507°N 88.3469°W	20:10–20:12	0.94 mi (1.51 km)	75 yd (69 m)
EF0	Several trees were damaged, including a few that were uprooted, along with numerous limbs downed. A barn was also damaged, with roofing material blown hundreds of yards downwind.						
EF1	E of Mercer to SW of Cleopatra	Mercer	MO	40.5085°N 93.4576°W	20:29–20:35	2.54 mi (4.09 km)	100 yd (91 m)
EF1	This tornado destroyed a garage and a barn, inflicted minor roof damage to a home, and snapped numerous trees.						
EF0	N of Princeton to S of Mercer	Mercer	MO	40.4397°N 93.5758°W	20:43–20:46	3.52 mi (5.66 km)	100 yd (91 m)
EF0	This high-end EF0 tornado crossed US 65 as it moved northeastward, damaging trees and leaning power poles.						
EF0	Alsip	Cook	IL	41.6717°N 87.7589°W	20:56–20:58	1.48 mi (2.38 km)	175 yd (160 m)
EF0	Several trees and power poles downed.						
EF0	NNW of Weatherby to NE of Alta Vista	DeKalb, Daviess	MO	39.9214°N 94.2511°W	20:56–21:03	4.35 mi (7.00 km)	75 yd (69 m)
EF0	This tornado damaged trees before dissipating along Route KK.						
EF2	SSE of Lucerne to SW of Unionville	Putnam	MO	40.422°N 93.2685°W	20:57–21:12	8.38 mi (13.49 km)	300 yd (270 m)
EF2	This strong tornado formed south-southeast of Lucerne and moved east-northeastward, initially snapping tree limbs. Shortly afterward, the tornado hit a farmstead at EF1 intensity, inflicting minor damage to the house, damaging three metal pole barns, destroying a chicken coop and two empty grain bins, damaging trees, and snapping two wooden power poles. After causing some additional tree damage as it moved through Terre Haute and crossed Route K, the tornado briefly reached low-end EF2 intensity, damaging or destroying an expansive pole barn and two of three grain bins. The tornado then gradually turned eastward, damaging more outbuildings and trees. The tornado then reached its peak intensity of mid-range EF2 as it crossed Route EE, obliterating a mobile home. Afterwards, the tornado rapidly weakened, causing some additional tree damage before lifting shortly after south of US 136.						
EF0	N of Lake Viking to SE of Jameson	Daviess	MO	39.9656°N 94.0735°W	21:13–21:22	5.45 mi (8.77 km)	75 yd (69 m)
EF0	This tornado formed shortly after the Alta Vista tornado dissipated. It moved east-northeastward and crossed Route DD, damaging trees and a manufactured home along its path.						
EF1	ESE of Jameson to NNE of Jamesport	Daviess	MO	39.9934°N 93.9621°W	21:25–21:39	10.48 mi (16.87 km)	200 yd (180 m)
EF1	This tornado formed just east of Route 13, moved northeastward, and crossed Route P. It destroyed a pole barn and damaged trees before dissipating shortly after crossing Route 190.						
EF0	S of Chariton	Putnam	MO	40.5682°N 92.7872°W	21:49–21:51	0.66 mi (1.06 km)	75 yd (69 m)
EF0	This weak tornado caused minor roof damage to a home and an outbuilding and inflicted sporadic damage to trees.						
EF0	NNW of Laredo	Grundy	MO	40.064°N 93.483°W	22:09–22:10	0.93 mi (1.50 km)	50 yd (46 m)
EF0	Trees suffered minor damage.						
EF0	Western Galt	Grundy	MO	40.1301°N 93.4062°W	22:18–22:19	0.67 mi (1.08 km)	100 yd (91 m)
EF0	Trees and a few grain bins were damaged.						
EF0	SW of Bloomfield	Davis	IA	40.66°N 92.50°W	22:23–22:26	0.54 mi (0.87 km)	25 yd (23 m)
EF0	An EF0 tornado was confirmed by NWS Des Moines. Preliminary information.						
EF0	W of Millard to S of Bullion	Adair	MO	40.1075°N 92.5914°W	23:36–23:43	6.79 mi (10.93 km)	75 yd (69 m)
EF0	This tornado initially inflicted minor damage to a solar panel array and trees as it traveled northeastward. It then turned east-northeastward and crossed US 63, moving through open country before turning back to the northeast. It then caused some minor tree damage before dissipating south of Route 6.						
EF0	E of Abilene to WNW of Enterprise	Dickinson	KS	38.9119°N 97.1786°W	00:12–00:15	1.48 mi (2.38 km)	50 yd (46 m)
EF0	A weak tornado damaged trees.						
EF0	N of Navarre	Dickinson	KS	38.84°N 97.11°W	00:45–00:48	1.48 mi (2.38 km)	50 yd (46 m)
EF0	Minor property and tree damage occurred.						
EF1	E of Shady Brook	Dickinson	KS	38.7414°N 96.9764°W	01:17–01:20	0.46 mi (0.74 km)	75 yd (69 m)
EF1	A garage door was blown in and an outbuilding and surrounding trees were damaged.						
EFU	N of Nickerson	Reno	KS	38.1779°N 98.0937°W	02:21–02:23	0.05 mi (0.080 km)	20 yd (18 m)
EFU	A brief tornado was captured on video.						
EF1	NE of Tallula to ESE of Lewisburg	Menard	IL	39.9737°N 89.9013°W	03:49–03:55	4.82 mi (7.76 km)	150 yd (140 m)
EF1	A tornado began by damaging several trees and a grain bin. It tracked due east through Lincoln's New Salem State Park, damaging numerous trees and removing shingles from a home. The tornado then crossed IL 97, damaging more trees in a neighborhood before lifting.						
EF1	Southwestern Athens	Menard	IL	39.9655°N 89.7606°W	03:59–04:03	2.53 mi (4.07 km)	200 yd (180 m)
EF1	Numerous trees were snapped.						
EF1	Northern Springfield to Mechanicsburg to NW of Mount Auburn	Sangamon	IL	39.8403°N 89.7409°W	04:04–04:30	24.04 mi (38.69 km)	250 yd (230 m)
EF1	This high-end EF1 tornado began west of Abraham Lincoln Capital Airport and moved almost due east, initially snapping trees and tree branches. The tornado then struck the airport, lofting 6,000 lb (2,700 kg) aircraft hangars and rolling an enclosed trailer as it crossed IL 29. After snapping more trees, turning east-southeastward, and crossing IL 4/IL 29, the tornado inflicted significant damage at an animal shelter, where a large metal building had the entire southern part of its roof removed, while the main office had part of its roof removed along with a partially collapsed exterior wall with debris strewn downwind in a field. It also snapped more trees along with wooden power poles. The tornado then crossed I-55 Bus./IL 29 and continued to snap and uproot trees and inflict minor damage to homes as it moved east-southeastward through neighborhoods in the northern part of Springfield. It then crossed I-55 and IL 54 as it exited Springfield and continued east-southeastward, inflicting minor damage to a church and snapping more trees and power poles as it moved through the Camp Butler National Cemetery. The tornado then crossed I-72 and the Sangamon River and struck a small community southeast of Riverton, damaging or destroying outbuildings, flipping and throwing a small trailer 30 ft (9.1 m), snapping more trees, and strewing debris through open fields and into trees. Continuing east-southeastward, the tornado caused minor tree damage as it moved through rural farmland before striking Mechanicsburg, where it snapped more trees and power poles, partially destroyed a farm outbuilding, and inflicted minor damage to homes. The tornado then continued to damage, snap, or uproot trees and snap power poles as it moved further east-southeastward before dissipating just north of the Sangamon River.						
EF1	NNW of Mount Pulaski to N of Forsyth	Logan, Macon	IL	40.051°N 89.3085°W	04:19–04:42	19.58 mi (31.51 km)	170 yd (160 m)
EF1	Trees were damaged, wooden power poles were leaned, and outbuildings suffered minor damage.						
EF0	Argenta to S of Cisco	Macon, Piatt	IL	39.9961°N 88.86°W	04:50–04:57	7.57 mi (12.18 km)	100 yd (91 m)
EF0	Trees and outbuildings were damaged.						

=== June 11 event ===
List of confirmed tornadoes – Thursday, June 11, 2026
EF#	Location	Region	State/Province	Start coord.	Time (UTC)	Path length	Max. width
EF1	E of Cerro Gordo to SSW of Ivesdale	Piatt	IL	39.8823°N 88.6514°W	05:02–05:08	9.93 mi (15.98 km)	70 yd (64 m)
EF1	A camper was flipped and destroyed, a grain storage building was unroofed, a couple of outbuildings, a grain bin, and trees were damaged, two power poles were snapped, and rotational marks were left in corn fields.						
EF1	E of Weeping Water (1st tornado)	Cass	NE	40.8793°N 96.1308°W	10:10–10:14	1.97 mi (3.17 km)	40 yd (37 m)
EF1	A farm building had its walls collapsed and trees were damaged.						
EF0	E of Weeping Water (2nd tornado)	Cass	NE	40.8634°N 96.0847°W	10:15–10:16	0.34 mi (0.55 km)	20 yd (18 m)
EF0	A very brief, weak tornado caused some light tree damage.						
EF1	N of Union	Cass	NE	40.8513°N 95.9324°W	10:21–10:24	2 mi (3.2 km)	40 yd (37 m)
EF1	At its touchdown point, this low-end EF1 tornado damaged a home and caused extensive tree damage in the surrounding area. More sporadic and weak tree damage occurred as the tornado moved southeastward and crossed US 34 before dissipating.						
EF1	WNW of McPaul	Fremont	IA	40.8298°N 95.8327°W	10:29–10:31	1.54 mi (2.48 km)	30 yd (27 m)
EF1	This tornado initially produced minor tree damage as it tracked east-southeastward. Right before reaching I-29, the tornado reached high-end EF1 intensity, ripping a large section of the roof off a residence, with some exterior walls also being knocked down. The tornado then quickly weakened and dissipated after crossing I-29 and causing some more tree damage.						
EF0	NW of Tabor	Mills	IA	40.9492°N 95.7373°W	10:33–10:35	1.65 mi (2.66 km)	20 yd (18 m)
EF0	A very brief, weak tornado produced sporadic tree damage.						
EF1	ESE of Coburg to NNW of Hepburn	Page	IA	40.8971°N 95.1789°W	10:58–11:08	7.1 mi (11.4 km)	100 yd (91 m)
EF1	This low-end EF1 tornado inflicted minor damage to one outbuilding, ripped the roof off another one and tossed it and grain bins out into fields, and damaged, snapped, or uprooted trees.						
EF1	ESE of Stanton to NNE of Villisca	Montgomery	IA	40.9725°N 95.0495°W	11:08–11:16	5.16 mi (8.30 km)	75 yd (69 m)
EF1	This tornado touched down and moved eastward into the Viking Lake State Park, snapping tree limbs and uprooting trees. The tornado then crossed Viking Lake and intensified, uprooting two large trees, snapping tree limbs, inflicting minor roof and siding damage to a home, and snapping 10 pine trees. The tornado then intensified further to its peak intensity as it continued eastward, collapsing an outbuilding, snapping another large tree, and downing power lines. The tornado then lofted grain bins for over a mile before depositing them at the US 34 interchange with US 71. The tornado then partially removed the roof of another home before abruptly dissipating.						
EF1	SSE of Villisca	Page	IA	40.8875°N 94.9672°W	11:11–11:13	1.87 mi (3.01 km)	50 yd (46 m)
EF1	A low-end EF1 tornado destroyed a carport, removed part of the roof and a wall from an outbuilding, and damaged trees.						
EF2	SSE of Corning to SSE Prescott	Adams	IA	40.93°N 94.69°W	11:26–11:32	6.02 mi (9.69 km)	200 yd (180 m)
EF2	This strong tornado touched down about 5 mi (8.0 km) southeast of Corning, ripping much of the roof off a home and destroying its attached garage. Moving northeast, it caused sporadic tree damage, snapped wooden power poles near Notchwood, and broke several dual-legged power poles. Additional tree and minor structural damage occurred before the tornado dissipated north of US 34.						
EFU	NNW of Ainsworth	Washington	IA	41.319°N 91.572°W	21:05–21:06	0.05 mi (0.080 km)	10 yd (9.1 m)
EFU	A thin tornado remained over a field.						
EFU	N of Middle Creek	Hancock	IL	40.402°N 91.047°W	21:15–21:17	0.22 mi (0.35 km)	10 yd (9.1 m)
EFU	Multiple chasers and spotters reported a brief tornado that caused no damage.						
EFU	NW of Macomb	McDonough	IL	40.487°N 90.738°W	21:54–21:55	0.08 mi (0.13 km)	10 yd (9.1 m)
EFU	A storm chaser recorded a short-lived condensation funnel. No damage occurred.						
EF3	E of Rome to SSW of La Rose	Woodford, Marshall	IL	40.8796°N 89.4295°W	21:56–22:15	10.97 mi (17.65 km)	930 yd (850 m)
EF3	See section on this tornado						
EF0	Ipava	Fulton	IL	40.3348°N 90.3564°W	22:17-22:22	2.36 mi (3.80 km)	30 yd (27 m)
EF0	Numerous storm chasers and storm spotters observed a very weak tornado that tossed a few solar panels at a solar farm before continuing into Ipava, where it dissipated and caused no damage in the village.						
EFU	NW of Canton	Fulton	IL	40.58°N 90.09°W	22:31–22:32	0.16 mi (0.26 km)	20 yd (18 m)
EFU	A brief tornado tracked through an open field, causing no damage.						
EF1	ESE of Wenona to S of Garfield	LaSalle	IL	41.0421°N 89.0116°W	22:31–22:41	4.4 mi (7.1 km)	500 yd (460 m)
EF1	The high-end EF1 tornado struck farmsteads outside of the town of Wenona, shattering windows, snapping trees and power poles, and leveling a garage.						
EF3	Long Point to Ancona to Eastern Streator	Livingston, La Salle	IL	40.9986°N 88.8961°W	22:32-22:59	11.9 mi (19.2 km)	600 yd (550 m)
EF3	See section on this tornado – Seven people were injured.						
EF1	N of Pontiac to Odell to WNW of Reddick	Livingston	IL	40.9463°N 88.6575°W	22:44-23:32	22.8 mi (36.7 km)	900 yd (820 m)
EF1	This long-tracked tornado moved across central Livingston County, producing mostly weak damage that consisted of downed tree limbs and other minor tree damage, including as it crossed I-55 and moved through Odell. After leaving Odell, the tornado strengthened south of Dwight, where it damaged the roofs and siding of several homes and destroyed a couple of barns. The tornado then weakened and dissipated just north of IL 17.						
EFU	WNW of Blackstone	Livingston	IL	41.089°N 88.7282°W	22:55–22:56	0.8 mi (1.3 km)	250 yd (230 m)
EFU	This brief tornado caused no recorded damage.						
EFU	NNW of Blackstone	LaSalle	IL	41.1113°N 88.6999°W	22:58–22:59	0.3 mi (0.48 km)	100 yd (91 m)
EFU	A tornado documented by storm chasers remained over open fields.						
EF1	S of Groveland to southern Morton to NE of Deer Creek	Tazewell, Woodford	IL	40.5676°N 89.5334°W	23:08-23:18	12.91 mi (20.78 km)	300 yd (270 m)
EF1	This tornado touched down and moved northeast along the southern edge of Morton, snapping numerous tree trunks, some of which fell onto vehicles. As it continued through residential areas, it caused extensive damage to tree limbs and minor roof damage to homes. After crossing I-74, the tornado damaged an outbuilding at a farmstead and continued to produce scattered tree damage until it dissipated after crossing into Woodford County.						
EF1	NW of Kenosha	Kenosha	WI	42.625°N 87.9036°W	23:12–23:13	0.49 mi (0.79 km)	75 yd (69 m)
EF1	Two barn outbuilding structures were damaged, with metal roofing material lofted and deposited several hundred yards downwind. Several trees also sustained large limb damage or were damaged or uprooted.						
EFU	SSE of Normandy to W of Walnut	Bureau	IL	41.54°N 89.64°W	23:12–23:14	1.39 mi (2.24 km)	10 yd (9.1 m)
EFU	A tornado was photographed and recorded as it caused no damage.						
EFU	NE of Compton to NE of Lee	Lee, DeKalb	IL	41.769°N 89.0249°W	00:01–00:09	6 mi (9.7 km)	50 yd (46 m)
EFU	This tornado caused no recorded damage as it tracked through fields.						
EFU	NE of Smyer	Hockley	TX	33.65°N 102.1°W	00:03	Unknown	Unknown
EFU	A brief landspout was reported.						
EF0	SE of Saybrook to S of Elliott	McLean, Ford	IL	40.3962°N 88.4796°W	00:06–00:16	10.91 mi (17.56 km)	100 yd (91 m)
EF0	This weak tornado damaged power poles, trees, and an outbuilding in the community of Harpster.						
EFU	E of Leesville	Kankakee	IL	41.0329°N 87.5949°W	00:08–00:09	0.6 mi (0.97 km)	50 yd (46 m)
EFU	This brief tornado caused no recorded damage.						
EF0	St. John to Schererville	Lake	IN	41.4409°N 87.5183°W	00:11-00:21	6 mi (9.7 km)	150 yd (140 m)
EF0	Several structures had exterior wall and roofing damage and trees were damaged.						
EF1	Northern Champaign to NW of Mayview	Champaign	IL	40.1539°N 88.2979°W	00:20-00:30	8.95 mi (14.40 km)	170 yd (160 m)
EF1	Many homes, businesses, outbuildings, and a warehouse suffered roof, solar panel, and fence damage. A small metal tower was knocked over, wooden power poles were snapped, and trees were damaged, snapped, or uprooted.						
EF1	NW of Paxton to SSE of Loda	Ford, Iroquois	IL	40.4788°N 88.1263°W	00:23–00:30	6.9 mi (11.1 km)	100 yd (91 m)
EF1	This tornado touched down northwest of Paxton and moved northeastward. An outbuilding was destroyed, ejecting debris and wooden boards onto a nearby field. The tornado then crossed I-57, inflicting minimal tree damage. The tornado later leveled another outbuilding, though its structural integrity was likely weakened by a tornado a year earlier. The tornado continued afterwards, unroofing and partially collapsing another outbuilding and peeling shingles off a home before dissipating south-southeast of Loda.						
EF2	Merrillville to Hobart	Lake	IN	41.5029°N 87.3819°W	00:25–00:37	6.6 mi (10.6 km)	700 yd (640 m)
EF2	See section on this tornado – One person was injured.						
EF1	E of Ludlow to SE of Paxton	Champaign, Ford	IL	40.3945°N 88.0808°W	00:26–00:29	2.99 mi (4.81 km)	150 yd (140 m)
EF1	This tornado touched down near the Champaign–Ford County line, where it partially removed the roof of an outbuilding and damaged solar panels. After crossing into Ford County, it intensified and caused significant damage at a farmstead, including partial roof loss from a residence, near-destruction of an outbuilding, and numerous snapped trees. The tornado then weakened and dissipated shortly afterwards.						
EF0	Southern Cedar Lake	Lake	IN	41.3445°N 87.4586°W	00:32–00:38	4.1 mi (6.6 km)	150 yd (140 m)
EF0	This tornado tracked northeastward through a subdivision, inflicting roof and siding damage to homes and tossing outdoor furniture and trash cans. The tornado then tracked east-northeastward through the south side of Cedar Lake, causing primarily tree damage before dissipating.						
EF0	NE of Schneider to S of Hebron	Lake, Porter	IN	41.2141°N 87.4111°W	00:36-00:58	12.6 mi (20.3 km)	200 yd (180 m)
EF0	This northeastward-moving tornado caused mainly tree damage.						
EF1	WNW of Fithian to western Danville	Vermilion	IL	40.1276°N 87.9106°W	00:39–00:53	13.49 mi (21.71 km)	100 yd (91 m)
EF1	A tornado paralleled I-74, where it caused significant tree damage in the Kickapoo State Recreation Area. Approximately 250 trees were snapped or uprooted. The tornado continued east and lifted just after entering Danville.						
EF1	Southern Hoopeston to Cheneyville	Vermilion	IL	40.4521°N 87.7022°W	00:44-00:52	8.07 mi (12.99 km)	100 yd (91 m)
EF1	A tornado touched down south of IL 9 where it overturned an irrigation pivot before crossing IL 1 and damaging the roof of a tractor dealership. As it skirted the southern edge of Hoopeston, it caused tree and roof damage, then strengthened as it continued east, snapping tree trunks, damaging a home's roof, and flattening an outbuilding. Additional tree damage occurred in Cheneyville, while severe wind damage to several buildings near IL 9 was also observed. The tornado weakened and dissipated before reaching the Indiana border.						
EF0	Southern Watseka	Iroquois	IL	40.7685°N 87.7354°W	00:45-00:47	2.1 mi (3.4 km)	250 yd (230 m)
EF0	Mainly tree damage occurred. A personal weather stationed measured a wind gust of 78 mph (126 km/h).						
EF3	NW of Demotte to S of South Wanatah	Lake, Porter, LaPorte	IN	41.2422°N 87.2768°W	00:48–01:24	21.81 mi (35.10 km)	450 yd (410 m)
EF3	See section on this tornado						
EF1	NE of Wellington	Iroquois	IL	40.5598°N 87.6261°W	00:48–00:49	1.2 mi (1.9 km)	50 yd (46 m)
EF1	This brief, weak tornado destroyed an outbuilding and downed power poles.						
EF1	Bartlett	DuPage	IL	41.9712°N 88.2209°W	00:53-00:57	2.24 mi (3.60 km)	400 yd (370 m)
EF1	This tornado rapidly intensified after developing near Pratt's Wayne Woods and moved into Bartlett, where it caused a concentrated area of damage at a commercial center. Several buildings lost roofing material. Brick columns and metal fencing were blown down and all of the gas pumps at a gas station were overturned. The tornado then continued east-northeast through nearby residential areas, causing extensive tree damage before dissipating in eastern Bartlett.						
EF1	SW of Boswell to Atkinson	Benton	IN	40.5022°N 87.4092°W	00:58–01:10	12.3 mi (19.8 km)	250 yd (230 m)
EF1	This tornado touched down and moved east-northeastward, damaging an outbuilding and peeling roof shingles off of a house. The tornado then crossed US 41 and blew down a barn and power lines before curving northeastward, blowing a press box off the bleachers at the Daugherty Speedway and flinging it into a power pole and then a field. The tornado then reached its peak intensity as it moved into Chase and crossed a railroad line, destroying a grain elevator and multiple grain bins and snapping a couple of trees along with multiple rows of power poles along SR 352. Another row of power poles was downed as the tornado struck Atkinson after crossing SR 55 and US 52. Northeast of there, the tornado blew down another set of power poles and a few trees, damaged the roof, chimney, and gutters of a home, and blew a chicken coop into a field, killing 30 chickens. The tornado then dissipated shortly thereafter.						
EF0	Ade to SE of Mount Ayr	Newton, Jasper	IN	40.8371°N 87.4956°W	00:58–01:12	15.5 mi (24.9 km)	200 yd (180 m)
EF0	This high-end EF0 tornado initially snapped branches off of trees and ripped roofing panels off an outbuilding before impacting the community of Ade. Multiple trees had their tree limbs ripped away and an outbuilding sustained significant roof damage. After snapping four power poles, the tornado impacted another farmstead, partially collapsing an outbuilding and inflicting shingle damage to the main farmhouse. A personal weather station at the farmstead recorded an 85 mph (137 km/h) wind gust. The tornado then leveled another outbuilding, snapped tree branches, and snapped a wooden power pole. It then struck another farmstead, destroying a grain bin and throwing the debris into another barn, damaging it. Afterwards, the tornado mainly caused minor to moderate tree damage before dissipating southeast of Mount Ayr.						
EF0	Morocco to SW of Fair Oaks	Newton	IN	40.9256°N 87.5081°W	00:58–01:10	12.6 mi (20.3 km)	200 yd (180 m)
EF0	The tornado impacted a farmstead southwest of Morocco at high-end EF0 intensity, removing multiple panels from an outbuilding and downing trees and a power pole. Then the tornado went through the town of Morocco, mainly inflicting moderate tree debranching. After exiting town, the tornado mainly caused moderate tree damage and damaged or flipped over irrigation pivots before dissipating.						
EF0	NW of Brisco to NE of Pine Village	Warren	IN	40.44°N 87.4002°W	00:59–01:10	10.53 mi (16.95 km)	75 yd (69 m)
EF0	This fast-moving, high-end EF0 tornado initially uprooted softwood trees after touching down. Afterwards, light damage was inflicted on an outbuilding before going through Hooker Corner, uprooting a tree and flattening crops. The tornado continued inflicting minimal damage to trees and an outbuilding before dissipating just short of the Warren/Benton county line.						
EF0	Eastern Naperville to southern Lisle	DuPage	IL	41.7622°N 88.1216°W	01:04–01:06	1.3 mi (2.1 km)	150 yd (140 m)
EF0	Extensive tree damage occurred, with some trees being snapped or uprooted.						
EF2	S of Willow Springs to Bridgeview to southwestern Chicago	Cook	IL	41.719°N 87.8638°W	01:15-01:22	8.4 mi (13.5 km)	350 yd (320 m)
EF2	A strong tornado touched down in the Spears-Pioneer Woods Forest Preserve, initially damaging trees before moving northeast through northern Hickory Hills, where additional trees and utility poles were damaged and homes sustained minor roof damage. After crossing I-294, the tornado strengthened, completely removing the roofs of two apartment buildings in southeastern Justice and causing six injuries on the top floor of one building. Another apartment building lost its roof in Bridgeview, while numerous other buildings sustained at least minor roof damage and widespread tree and utility-pole damage continued. The tornado weakened as it entered Chicago, but continued damaging roofs, siding, and trees through the Clearing and Garfield Ridge neighborhoods and just north of Midway International Airport before dissipating.						
EFU	NW of La Crosse	Porter	IN	41.3658°N 86.9345°W	01:23–01:24	0.24 mi (0.39 km)	10 yd (9.1 m)
EFU	This satellite tornado of the 0048 UTC EF3 tornado did not produce any known damage.						
EF0	E of Caledonia	Kent	MI	42.784°N 85.467°W	01:31–01:34	4.24 mi (6.82 km)	70 yd (64 m)
EF0	Trees were significantly damaged.						
EF0	S of Middleville to W of Hastings	Barry	MI	42.659°N 85.460°W	01:31–01:34	2.95 mi (4.75 km)	50 yd (46 m)
EF0	Trees were extensively damaged and a house was left covered in branches.						
EF0	S of Yeoman	Carroll	IN	40.6064°N 86.7644°W	01:31–01:35	3.38 mi (5.44 km)	75 yd (69 m)
EF0	A brief tornado touched down near the Tippecanoe River, causing tree and home damage to several properties. The tornado then turned east, impacting two more homes and a hog farm before dissipating.						
EF0	NE of Lockport	Carroll	IN	40.717°N 86.5511°W	01:43–01:44	0.27 mi (0.43 km)	25 yd (23 m)
EF0	A weak tornado downed large tree limbs.						
EF1	N of Georgetown	Cass	IN	40.7511°N 86.5132°W	01:46–01:48	0.84 mi (1.35 km)	250 yd (230 m)
EF1	The tornado touched down in a forested area north of Georgetown, snapping and uprooting several hardwood trees. An outbuilding sustained significant roof damage. The tornado continued snapping or uprooting trees. The tornado then impacted a farmstead, damaging or demolishing outbuildings and a grain bin, tossing debris into a treeline. The tornado dissipated shortly afterwards.						
EF1	NNW of Adamsboro	Cass	IN	40.8106°N 86.2947°W	01:58–02:01	1.49 mi (2.40 km)	100 yd (91 m)
EF1	A tornado initially damaged the roof of a barn before moving northeast and leaving a noticeable swath of crop scouring. It then destroyed a large pole barn and caused additional roof damage to several agricultural buildings along its path. The tornado weakened as it continued, producing only minor tree damage before dissipating.						
EF0	Argos	Marshall	IN	41.2278°N 86.255°W	02:11–02:15	2.87 mi (4.62 km)	125 yd (114 m)
EF0	This weak tornado inflicted moderate tree damage.						
EF1	E of Plymouth	Marshall	IN	41.3516°N 86.2623°W	02:11–02:12	0.73 mi (1.17 km)	125 yd (114 m)
EF1	This tornado briefly touched down and uprooted or snapped multiple trees while also damaging a barn. As it moved northeast, it overturned a center-pivot irrigation system and snapped additional trees within a grove before inflicting significant damage to another barn. The tornado then quickly weakened and lifted.						
EF1	Southern Wabash	Wabash	IN	40.7671°N 85.8551°W	02:22-02:27	4.66 mi (7.50 km)	110 yd (100 m)
EF1	This high-end EF1 tornado began on the southwest side of Wabash, where it snapped multiple wooden power poles before moving northeast into residential areas and damaging numerous homes. Damage included shingle loss, sections of roof decking removed, debris lofted into nearby tree lines, and an overturned camper. Further along its path, the tornado destroyed an outbuilding and reached peak intensity when it damaged several more homes, blowing out windows, removing roof decking, and shifting a manufactured home off its foundation, resulting in two injuries. Afterwards, the damage diminished to mainly downed trees, branches, and power lines before the tornado dissipated.						
EF1	NE of Bourbon	Marshall, Kosciusko	IN	41.3301°N 86.0746°W	02:22–02:27	3.34 mi (5.38 km)	300 yd (270 m)
EF1	This tornado began by inflicting minor tree damage. It then impacted a farmstead, demolishing two old barns and damaging another one on the property. Several trees were snapped and metal roofing material was torn off. Then the tornado entered Kosciusko County, flipping over a travel trailer and snapping multiple softwood trees before dissipating.						
EF1	W of Harlansburg to ENE of Andrews	Huntington	IN	40.8146°N 85.6399°W	02:33-02:41	5.83 mi (9.38 km)	75 yd (69 m)
EF1	A tornado damaged multiple properties along its path. Several homes sustained loss of shingles, siding, and roof panels, while numerous trees were damaged or snapped. Additional damage included an outbuilding that lost sections of its roof and a mobile home that lost its roof entirely. The tornado weakened before reaching the Wabash River, with only isolated tree branch damage observed near the end of its path.						
EF1	N of Pleasant Plain to W of Plum Tree	Huntington	IN	40.6993°N 85.5487°W	02:39–02:48	7.9 mi (12.7 km)	50 yd (46 m)
EF1	This tornado touched down north of Pleasant Plain and produced sporadic tree damage along much of its path, including numerous damaged trees and several trunks snapped well above their bases. Near SR 5 and just northwest of I-69, the tornado reached peak intensity and nearly destroyed a newly built barndominium, leaving only one wall standing and scattering debris more than 100 yd (91 m) into adjacent fields. Additional tree damage occurred as it continued east-northeast before the tornado crossed I-69 and dissipated.						
EF2	Northeastern Elkhart to Bristol	Elkhart	IN	41.7122°N 85.9333°W	02:42–02:50	6.12 mi (9.85 km)	100 yd (91 m)
EF2	A strong tornado began on the eastern edges of Elkhart, causing minor roof damage to homes and uprooting trees before intensifying as it moved northeast. At its strongest, it destroyed a garage, caused significant roof damage to a nearby residence, displaced a shed, nearly removed the roof from another home, and injured one person. The tornado continued through residential areas and open fields, snapping and uprooting numerous trees and causing minor roof damage to additional homes. Damage lessened to scattered downed branches and trees, although the tornado would continue into Bristol before dissipating.						
EF1	NE of Huntington	Huntington	IN	40.9122°N 85.4743°W	02:44-02:45	0.65 mi (1.05 km)	25 yd (23 m)
EF1	This tornado briefly touched down east of SR 9, causing severe damage to a single residence where the entire roof was removed and debris was scattered into nearby fields. A detached garage was also destroyed and intense dirt and insulation splatter were observed around the property. The tornado lifted shortly afterward, with little to no damage noted beyond the immediate area.						
EF1	NW of Shipshewana to W of Howe	LaGrange	IN	41.7223°N 85.6466°W	02:59–03:06	9.89 mi (15.92 km)	1,300 yd (1,200 m)
EF1	This large tornado snapped and uprooted numerous trees, inflicted major roof damage to outbuildings, and flipped or twisted a few irrigation pivots.						
EF0	Balbec	Jay	IN	40.5144°N 85.1644°W	03:00–03:02	1.14 mi (1.83 km)	75 yd (69 m)
EF0	This tornado began by blowing the roof off a barn and damaging the roof of a nearby home. Several trees were also snapped. The tornado moved northeast, causing further damage to roofs and trees before lifting just as it crossed SR 1.						
EF1	SSE of Rocklane to ENE of Fairland	Johnson, Shelby	IN	39.5979°N 86.0018°W	03:03–03:19	11.94 mi (19.22 km)	200 yd (180 m)
EF1	This tornado impacted and damaged several homes and outbuildings.						
EF1	E of South Milford to northwestern Angola	LaGrange, Steuben	IN	41.5288°N 85.2302°W	03:12–03:28	15.12 mi (24.33 km)	250 yd (230 m)
EF1	This tornado caused damage only to trees and power poles as it tracked through rural areas and the western and northern sides of Angola.						
EF0	N of Maxville	Randolph	IN	40.1809°N 85.1112°W	03:17–03:18	0.32 mi (0.51 km)	25 yd (23 m)
EF0	A home had an awning ripped off, an RV was rotated and pushed, and a 500-gallon propane tank was ripped off a concrete block.						

== See also ==
- Tornadoes of 2026
- List of United States tornadoes from May to June 2026
