= Michael Aylesworth =

American politician (born 1943)

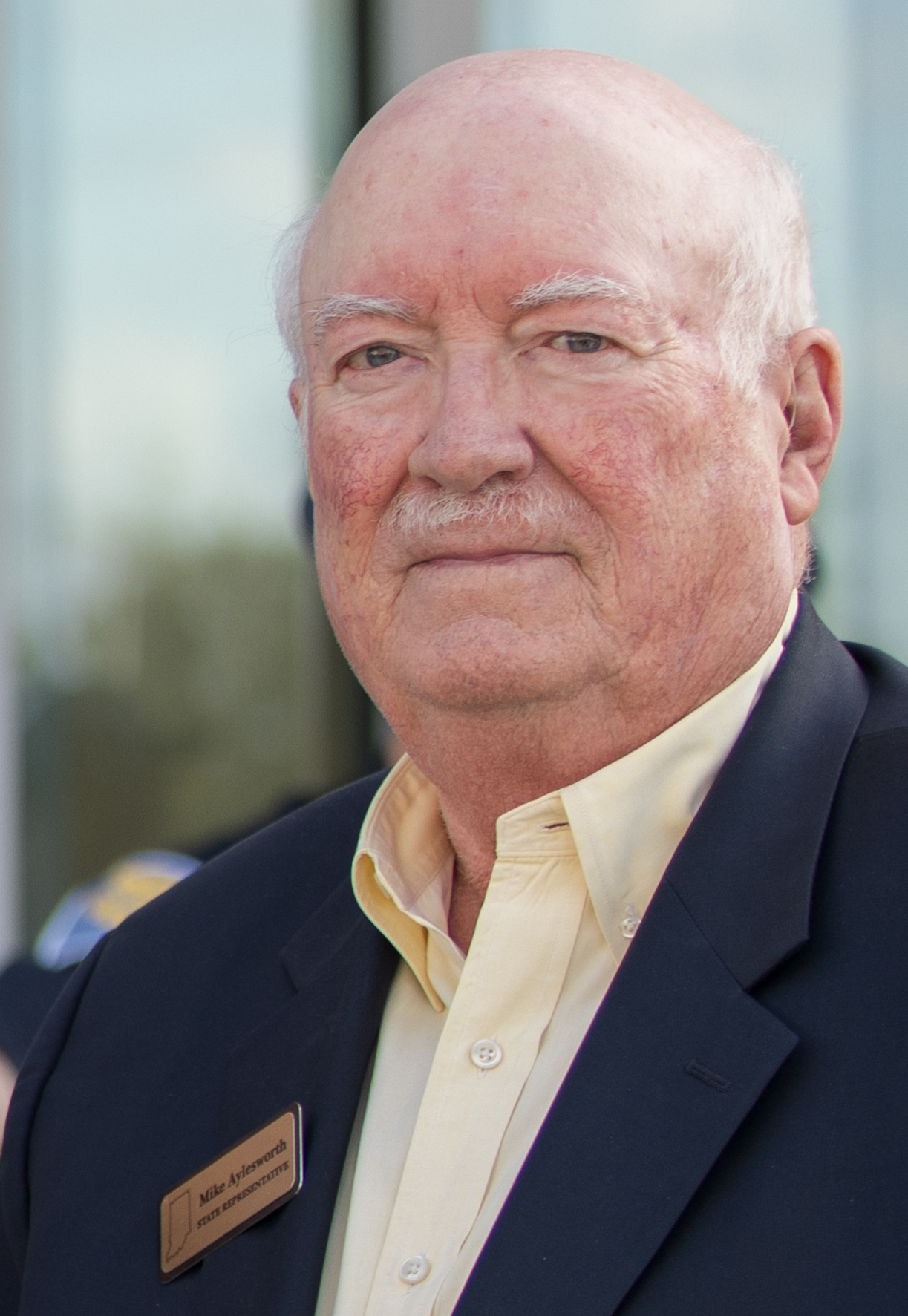

Member of the Indiana House of Representatives from the 11th district
- Incumbent
- Assumed office November 19, 2014
- Preceded by: Rick Niemeyer

Personal details
- Born: Michael J. Aylesworth; March 24, 1943 (age 83) Hebron, Indiana
- Party: Republican
- Spouse: Dolores RaeHaberlin
- Children: Three sons
- Education: Indiana University (B.S.); Valparaiso University (M.A.)
- Profession: Represantive

Michael Jerome Aylesworth (born March 24, 1943) is an American politician who is a current member of the Indiana House of Representatives. A member of the Republican Party, Aylesworth was elected to the Indiana House on November 4, 2014, and was subsequently sworn in on November 19 of that year. Elected to represent the 11th district, Aylesworth's district represents southern Lake and Porter County. He previously served on the Porter County board of commissioners from 1977 to 1984 and on the Porter County Council from 1988 to 1992.

== Early life, education and career ==
Michael Jerome Aylesworth was born in Hebron, Indiana to parents Mary Jane (née Olson) and John Cylde Aylesworth. He is a fifth generation resident of Porter County, after his great-great-grandfather settled in Boone Township from Wayne County in the mid-1840s and purchased farmland which is still partially owned by the Aylesworth today. Aylesworth grew up on his family farm with his seven brothers and sisters, attending Hebron Elementary School and graduating from Hebron High School in 1961.

After graduating high school, he attended Saint Joseph's College in Rensselaer, Indiana and graduated from Indiana University Bloomington with his Bachelor of Science in secondary education in 1966. Aylesworth later went on to receive his Master of Arts in liberal studies from Valparaiso University in 1989.

Upon graduating from Indiana University, Aylesworth worked at Boone Grove High School in Valparaiso, Indiana, where he taught social studies for one year. He was then drafted into the United States Army in 1968, being trained in communications and specializing in morse code and teletype. He was stationed in Korea and attained the rank of a Sergeant before being relieved from active duty in 1969 and being honorably discharged in 1973. After his Army service, Aylesworth began agricultural pursuits in Porter County and operated Aylesworth Farms, Inc, leasing three small farms in the area that were involved in corn and soybean production. He subsequently purchased 165 acres of his family's farm in 1973 with the help of Farmers Home Administration beginner farmer loan guarantees. By 1998, under his operation, Aylesworth's Farms amassed over 2400 acres of agricultural land. It remained under his ownership until 2003.

== Business and political career ==
Aylesworth entered politics in 1976, upon being elected to the Porter County board of commissioners. He served eight years in this position from January 1977 to December 1984, where he spent part of this time serving his first two of three nonconsecutive terms as the chairman of the Porter County Republican Party from 1982 to 1991. He later served one term on the Porter County Council from January 1988 to December 1992.

He began his final term as Porter County Republican Party chairman in 1997, holding the position until 2002. During his time as county GOP chair, Aylesworth became the president of the Indiana Corn Growers Association from 1997 to 2002 and also served two years as the president of the Indiana Corn Marketing Council from the start of its creation in 2001. He was also appointed to the national policy team of the National Corn Growers Association in 1998, serving in this position until his term as president of the ICGA expired.

In April 2002, Aylesworth co-founded Iroquois Bio Energy Company, an ethanol company based in Rensselaer, where he served on the company's board of directors and was its first president. He was appointed to serve as the northern director of the Indiana Department of Environmental Management, serving in the position under the administrations of Indiana Governors Mitch Daniels and Mike Pence from June 1, 2005, until his election to the statehouse in 2014. Aylesworth also served on the Porter County drainage board for twelve years, where he served as its chairman.

== Indiana House of Representatives ==
After incumbent Republican state representative Rick Niemeyer opted to run for the Indiana State Senate, Aylesworth filed to run for his seat and declared his candidacy for the Indiana House of Representatives on February 2, 2014. In the Republican primary, Aylesworth defeated Lowell, Indiana town council member Michael Mears 1,027 to 313 votes, or 76.6% to 23.3%. He went on to face Democrat Jim Metro, a former member of the Cedar Lake, Indiana zoning board, in the general election. On November 4, 2014, Aylesworth won in the general election, with 8,526 votes to Metro's 6,511 votes, or 56.7% to 43.3%. He was sworn into office on November 19, 2014.

== Personal life ==
Aylesworth lives in Hebron, Indiana with his wife Delores Rae (née Haberlin), a practicing attorney, whom he has been married to since 1971. They have three adult sons and eight grandchildren. Aylesworth is a practicing Roman Catholic and attends services at St. Mary's Catholic Church in Kouts, Indiana.
