= Tornado outbreak and derecho of June 9–11, 2026 =

Tornado outbreak

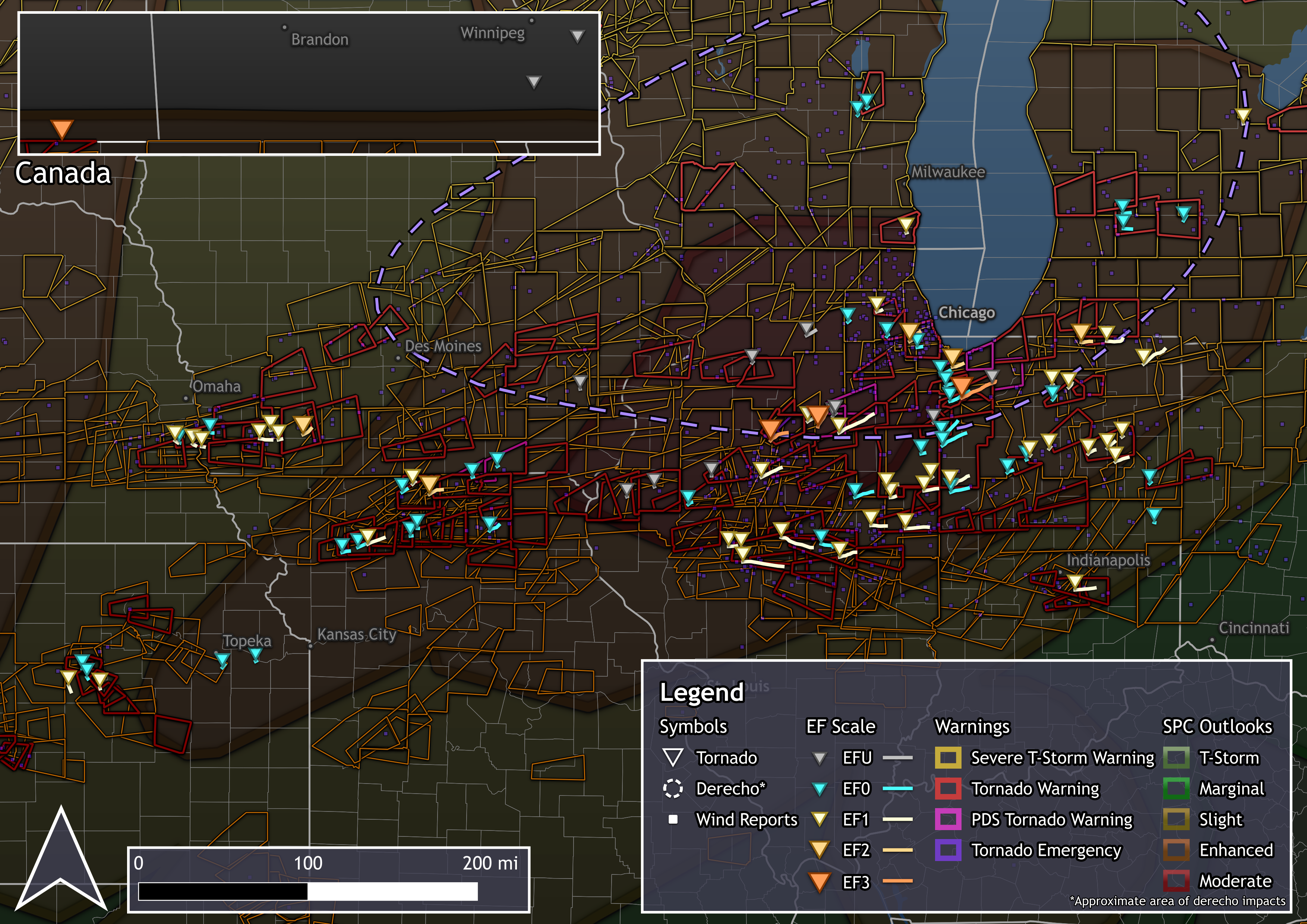
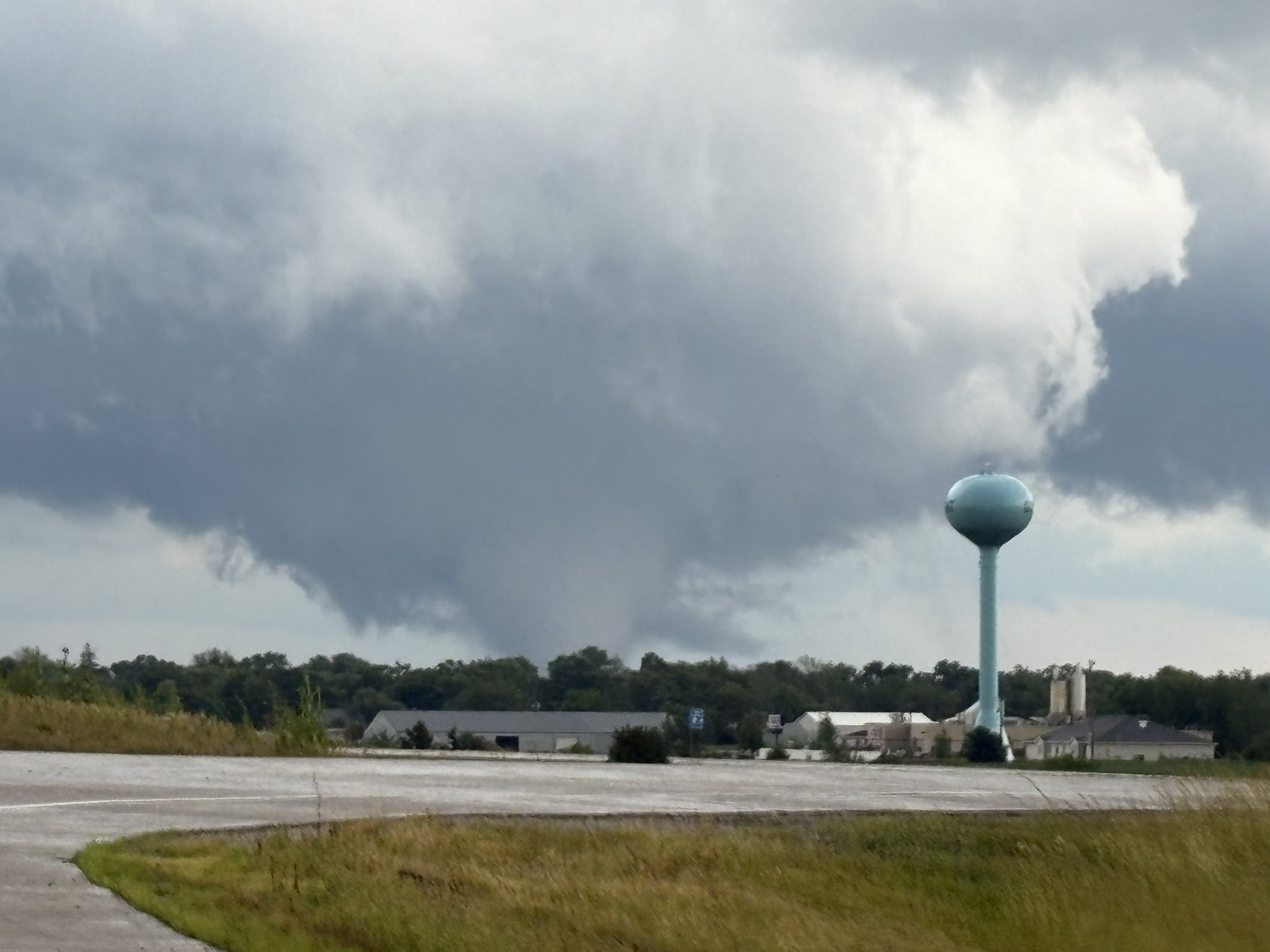
- Clockwise from top: Map of confirmed tornadoes, severe thunderstorm warnings, and tornado warnings during the outbreak; A house that was completely destroyed by a high-end EF3 tornado near Kouts, Indiana; Radar imagery of an EF3 tornado outside of Washburn, Illinois; An EF3 tornado approaching Streator, Illinois; Significant damage to a home in Merrillville, Indiana, following an EF2 tornado; An EF1 tornado in rural areas near Dwight, Illinois

Meteorological history
- Duration: June 9–11, 2026

Tornado outbreak
- Tornadoes: 102
- Max. rating: EF3 tornado
- Duration: 2 days, 22 hours, 16 minutes
- Highest winds: Tornadic – 165 mph (266 km/h) (Kouts, Indiana EF3 on June 11)
- Highest gusts: Non-tornadic – 94 mph (151 km/h) in Wittman Field, Wisconsin on June 10
- Largest hail: 3.5 inches (8.9 cm) near Yorktown, Iowa on June 10

Overall effects
- Fatalities: 3 (non-tornadic)
- Injuries: 17
- Areas affected: Southern Canada, Central and Midwestern United States
- Power outages: 650,000
- Part of the Tornadoes of 2026

From June 9–11, 2026, a major tornado outbreak and associated derecho occurred across the Central and Midwestern United States and southern portions of Canada, causing significant damage in its wake. The Storm Prediction Center (SPC) first issued an enhanced risk for severe weather on June 9 for the regions of North and South Dakota as well as Nebraska, though only a few tornadoes occurred, including an EF3 tornado that touched down near Oxbow, Saskatchewan, severely damaging a farmstead. Continued activity occurred on June 10 with multiple tornadoes occurring across Missouri and Iowa, including an EF2 tornado that caused significant damage to rural areas near Unionville, Missouri.

The bulk of the activity took place on June 11, where the SPC issued a moderate risk for severe weather with a heightened chance for strong tornadoes. The states of Illinois and Indiana saw multiple long-lived and intense tornadoes touch down. In Illinois, a large EF3 tornado demolished a log home, severely damaged numerous trees, and triggered a tornado emergency for Toluca. Another EF3 tornado struck eastern portions of Streator, damaging dozens of residences and injuring seven people, and a long-tracked EF1 tornado moved across rural areas near Dwight, inflicting damage to multiple structures.

Later that afternoon, an EF2 tornado tracked through Merrillville, Indiana, damaging hundreds of structures and injuring one person. A high-end EF3 tornado, the strongest of the outbreak, traveled near Kouts, Indiana, completely destroying multiple homes, severely damaging trees, and shearing transmission towers from their bases. An EF2 tornado significantly damaged several apartments and injured six people after tracking through Bridgeview, Illinois, and one person was injured after another EF2 tornado inflicted significant damage to homes in Elkhart, Indiana.

Accompanying the tornado outbreak was a significant derecho event that traveled more than 400 mi (640 km) across the states of Iowa, Wisconsin, Illinois and Indiana on June 10, producing wind gusts well over 75 mph (121 km/h) and causing significant damage. Combined, the two events caused more than 264,000 customers to lose power at the height of the storms.

During the three-day period, 102 tornadoes touched down across nine US states and two Canadian provinces, injuring 17 people and causing significant damage. Additionally, three people were killed due to being struck by trees that were downed by straight-line wind.

== Meteorological synopsis ==
=== June 9 ===
On June 4, the Storm Prediction Center outlined a 15% probability of a severe thunderstorm within 25 miles (40 km) of a point for June 9, with the area covering a large portion of western North Dakota, stretching from the northern state border to the southern one. A mid-level trough was likely to be draped over the western US, with an area of stronger upper-level winds moving across the Northern Plains. A low-pressure system was expected to strengthen over the northern High Plains, with a trough stretching from the central to southern High Plains, and along with low-level convergence, supported the development of severe thunderstorms.

On June 5, the Storm Prediction Center expanded the 15% severe weather area to include more of North Dakota, encompassing most of the central part of the state, along with a narrow portion of northern South Dakota. A short-wave trough with a mid-level jet streak extending from the base were expected to develop, along with a strengthening low-pressure area over the northern High Plains, with the low moving into the Dakotas by June 10. Alongside the low-pressure area, a Pacific or cold front was expected to move from the Rockies, with ample atmospheric moisture and sufficient wind shear forecasted to be present ahead of the low-pressure area and front, creating an environment conductive to the formation of severe weather.

On June 6, the 15% severe weather area was significantly expanded, enveloping nearly all of North Dakota, a slim portion of western Minnesota, and a large portion of central-northeastern South Dakota. The low-pressure area was expected to form over western North Dakota before moving over eastern Minnesota by the afternoon. The warm sector ahead of the low-pressure area and front was expected to have steep low and mid-level lapse rates, and along with dew points around 60 °F (16 °C), supported the development of thunderstorms during the later afternoon and evening hours of June 9. Intensifying vertical wind shear and associated jet streaks were expected to favor the formation of supercells capable of producing large hail and strong winds, with a tornado threat being possible in the late evening when the low-level jet streak strengthens, increasing low-level wind shear.

On June 9, a low-pressure system that formed over Montana was expected to move east-northeastward and pass over portions of southeastern Saskatchewan, southwestern Manitoba, and northwestern North Dakota during the afternoon hours. Isolated storms were forecasted to form in southwestern portions of Manitoba, bringing a threat for hail and tornadoes. Additionally, linear storms were expected to develop along a cold front or dry line across Saskatchewan and North Dakota later in the evening and track quickly to the east, potentially meeting the criteria to be classified as a derecho.

=== June 10 ===
An enhanced risk for severe weather was issued on June 10 for parts of the Upper Midwest, including a risk for strong tornadoes and wind. At around 12:45 PM, a derecho was spotted over Northern Illinois and Southern Wisconsin traveling west for over 400 miles, causing consistent 80 mph (128 kph) straight-line winds. This collapsed the Culver's Blue Barn in Beaver Dam, WI and the Sandusky State Theater in Sandusky, OH. Later that day, a large long tracked EF2 tornado struck near the town of Unionville, Missouri. This storm was tagged with multiple PDS tornado warnings.

=== June 11 ===
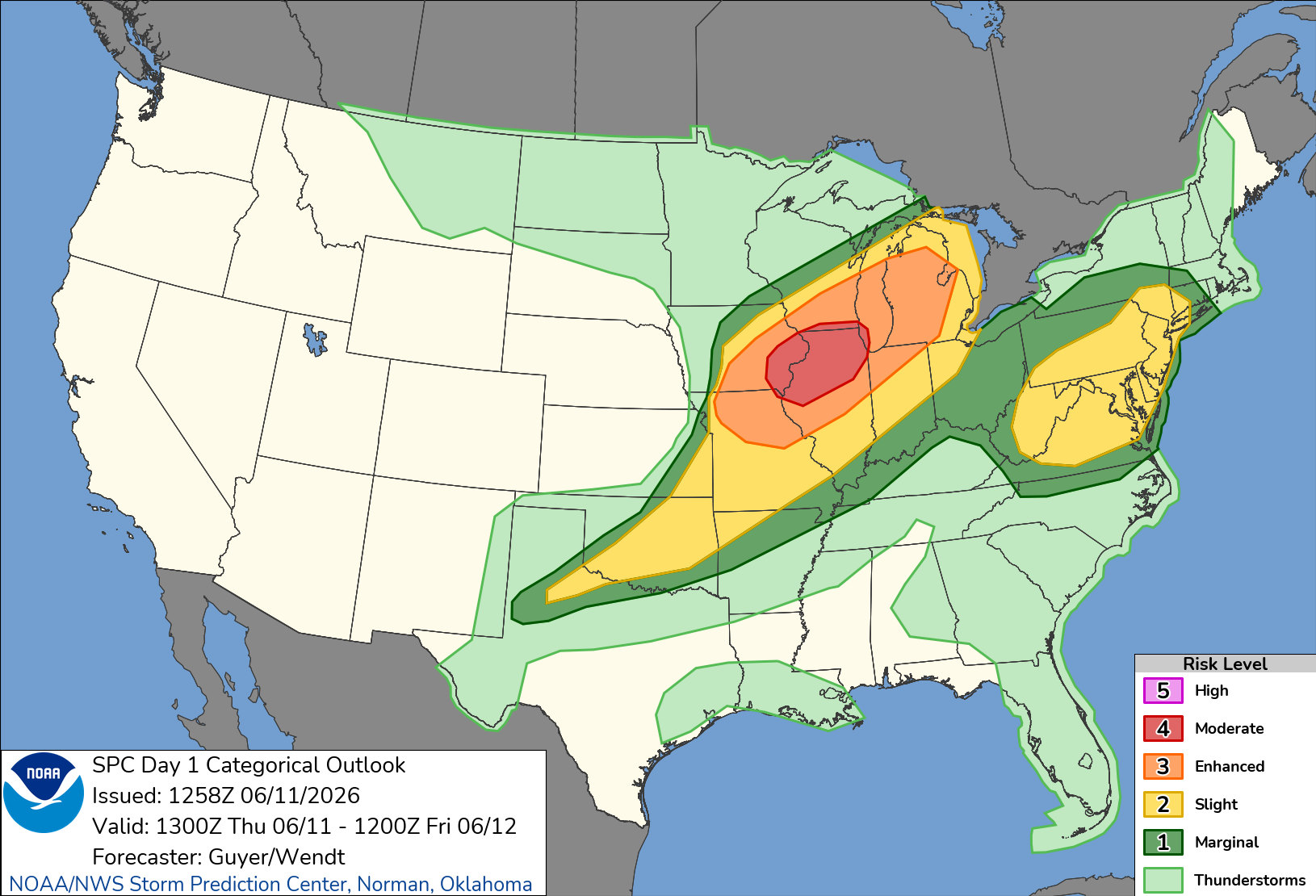
SPC Day 1 Outlook issued at 1300 UTC on June 11

The first instance that a severe weather event was possible for June 11 was evident four days earlier on June 7, when the Storm Prediction Center (SPC) highlighted a 15% risk of severe weather over the lower Great Lakes and Midwest, citing a shortwave trough expected to move through the region. It was upgraded to a 30% risk of severe weather the following day from northeastern Missouri through the northern half of Illinois, citing increased confidence. On the Day 3 outlook at 07:30 UTC on June 9, an enhanced risk was issued by the SPC for Missouri to western Michigan, as an unseasonably strong 500-mb jet with mid-level winds near 70–80 kn (81–92 mph; 130–150 km/h) was expected to be present. The evolving question regarding tornadic potential was whether the airmass over the risk area would recover enough and destabilize sufficiently following a mesoscale convective system (MCS) that was expected to pass through the risk area during the morning hours of the event.

On June 11, the risk was upgraded to a moderate (4/5) risk for severe weather during the 1300z outlook cycle. This was driven by a risk of tornadoes with a 15% risk contour and CIG2 hatching, denoting a probable max tornado intensity of at least EF3, and a risk of straight-line winds with a 60% risk contour and CIG 1 hatching. As the shortwave approached, a low-level jet in excess of 30–40 kn (35–46 mph; 56–74 km/h) were expected to intensify to coincide with the destabilizing atmosphere in the maximum risk corridor, which would allow for supercells to develop along the advancing cold front of the parent system. Tornadic activity began later that evening. A tornado emergency was issued for Toluca, Illinois due to a large wedge tornado, rated EF3. That same supercell would eventually spawn another EF3 tornado that hit the south-southeastern parts of Streator, where at least four people were injured. A damaging EF1 tornado touched down in Dwight but missed most structures in the path. A low-end EF2 tornado impacted Merrillville and Hobart, Indiana, prompting a PDS Tornado Warning. An EF1 tornado touched down near Hebron prompting another PDS tornado warning, followed by a high-end EF3 tornado touching down in Kouts.

== Confirmed tornadoes ==
Confirmed tornadoes by Enhanced Fujita rating
EFU	EF0	EF1	EF2	EF3	EF4	EF5	Total
20	35	38	5	4	0	0	102

=== Wilbern–Washburn, Illinois ===
Wilbern–Washburn, Illinois
- A photo of the large tornado near Washburn

Meteorological history
- Formed: June 11, 2026, 4:56 p.m. CDT (UTC–05:00)
- Dissipated: June 11, 2026, 5:15 p.m. CDT (UTC–05:00)
- Duration: 19 minutes

EF3 tornado
- on the Enhanced Fujita scale
- Highest winds: 155 mph (249 km/h)

Overall effects
- Fatalities: 0
- Injuries: 0

This large and intense tornado first touched down at 4:56 pm CDT in Woodford County, just north of Banta Road and to the east of the Illinois River, uprooting and damaging trees at EF1 intensity. The tornado tracked northeastward, mainly damaging trees over forested areas before tracking over Bricktown Road, where it impacted several outbuildings, including one that was completely destroyed. The tornado turned more to the east, crossing Dry Creek and tracking along Columbia Road to the south. An outbuilding had its walls collapse, and various trees were snapped and damaged. The tornado crossed Columbia Road just to the west of the Columbia Road/County Road 810 East intersection, where a home had several windows shattered. Power poles along Columbia Road were snapped, and several hardwood trees were damaged at EF2 strength. The tornado continued northeastward, damaging and removing the roofs from a single-family home and two mobile homes before destroying another outbuilding. The tornado turned more to the north as it crossed Washburn Road, damaging a home and hardwood trees at EF2 intensity. A nearby corn field suffered extensive crop damage. The tornado tracked through rural areas, crossing Snag Creek and entering Marshall County as it caused EF1 damage to various trees. The tornado then tracked across the Pleasantview Road/Snag Creek Road intersection, damaging homes and outbuildings, with one mobile home having its entire roof structure removed. The tornado continued to track northeastward, crossing Pleasantview Road for the second time as it collapsed another outbuilding and damaged the roof of a mobile home. A Ford F350 in the area was tossed approximately 100 yards (91 m). The tornado tracked just south of Pleasantview Road, inflicting EF2 damage to a home on the northern side of the road before crossing it once again.

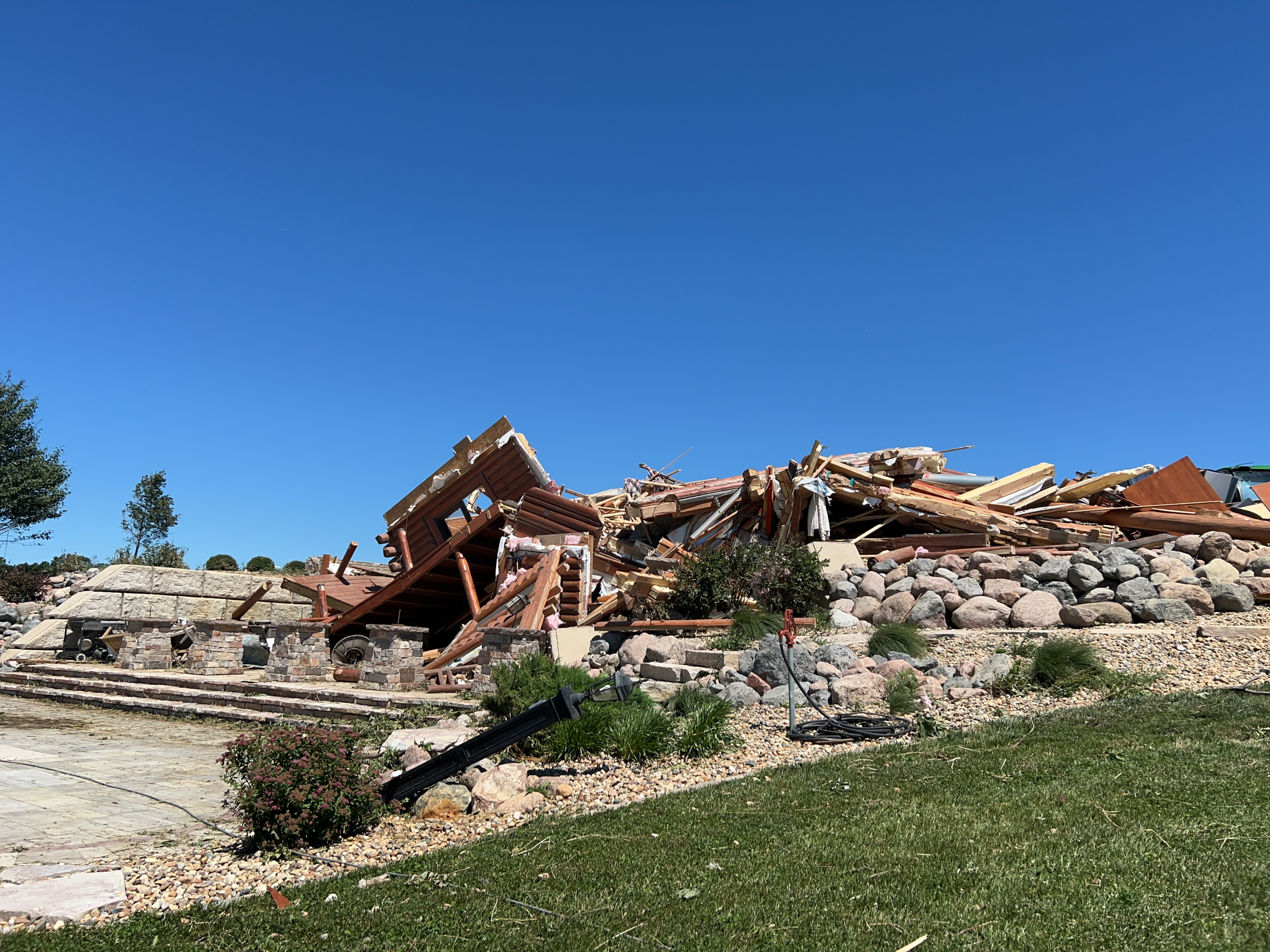
A log home near Washburn, Illinois, that had all its walls collapsed at EF3 intensity

The tornado tracked just north of Pleasantview Road, snapping hardwood trees at EF2 intensity. The tornado inflicted EF1 damage to a residence. To the north of this home, numerous trees were snapped and damaged, including several hardwoods that were stubbed and debarked at mid-range EF3 intensity. The tornado continued inflicting EF3 damage to trees as it crossed another road just north of Pleasantview Road. The tornado continued tracking northeast, damaging a grove of trees at EF2 strength before striking a log house at peak intensity southeast of Wilbern. This newly built, well-anchored log home had all its walls collapsed, with several exterior walls being pushed 10–20 feet (3.0–6.1 m) off the foundation. The structure lacked steel beam support throughout the construction. A nearby flag pole was bent at the base, a large propane tank that was completely filled was tipped over, and a car was tossed 30 feet (9.1 m) to the east of the garage. The tornado's maximum wind speeds of 155 miles per hour (249 km/h) were estimated at this location. The tornado weakened before crossing County Road 100, where a home sustained EF2 damage and an outbuilding was destroyed. Power poles along the road were snapped, and nearby trees sustained significant damage. The tornado maintained EF2 intensity as it struck another home, tearing off the entire roof and attic structure. Another outbuilding was destroyed, and more trees were damaged. The tornado continued to the northeast just north of Washburn, snapping power poles along Tax School Road and inflicting EF1 damage to various trees. As the tornado crossed IL 89, it bent steel poles at EF2 intensity before impacting a solar farm, with numerous solar panels being damaged. Around this time at 5:11 p.m. CDT, a tornado emergency was issued for Toluca, Wenona, and Varna as the tornado continued to track northeastward. The tornado tracked just south of County Road 150 North, dissipating right before crossing the road at 5:15 pm CDT. The tornado traveled for 11.23 miles (18.07 km) and reached a maximum width of 930 yards (850 m).

=== Long Point–Ancona–Streator, Illinois ===
Long Point–Ancona–Streator, Illinois
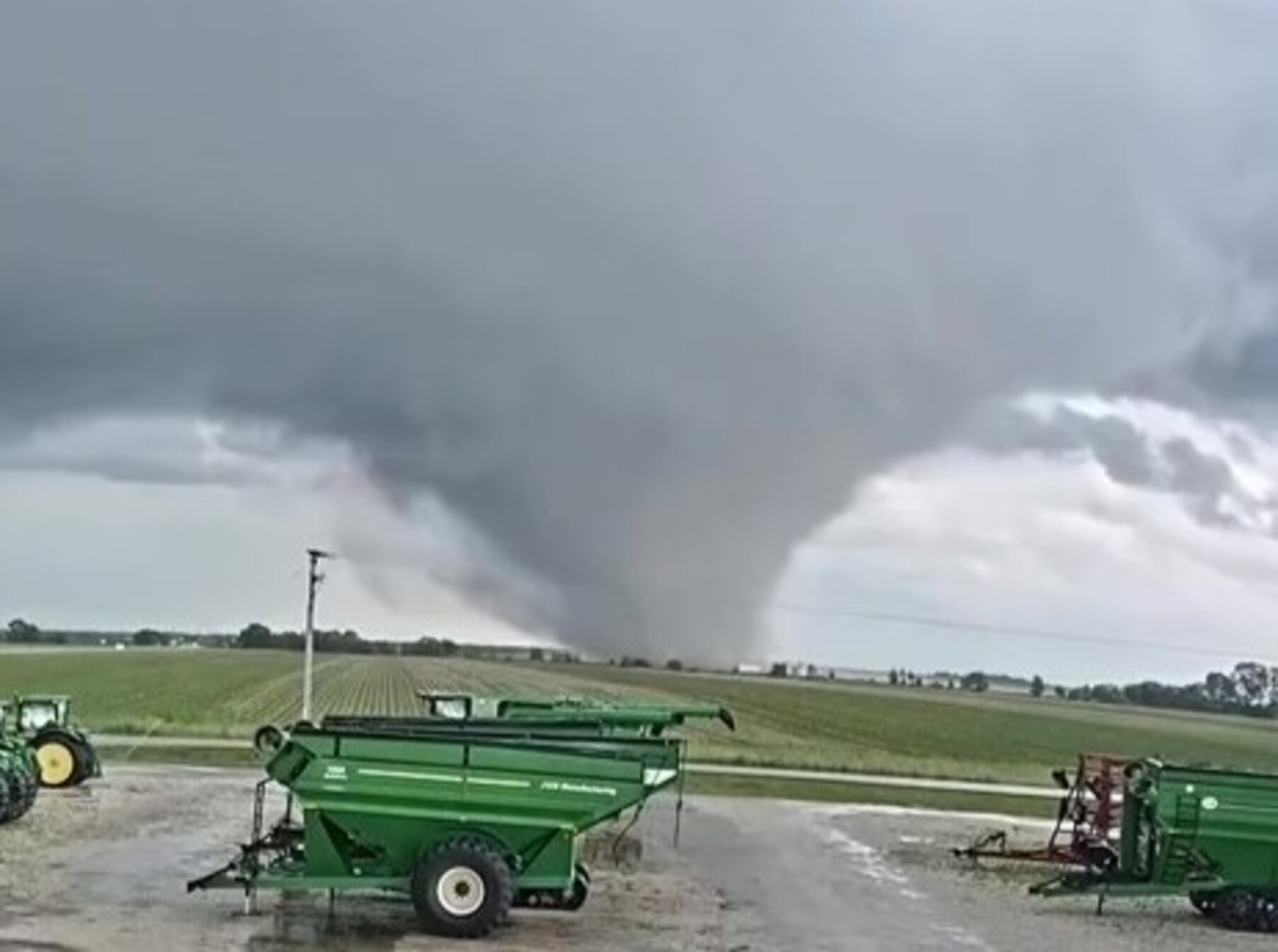
- The EF3 tornado near Streator

Meteorological history
- Formed: June 11, 2026, 5:32 p.m. CDT (UTC–05:00)
- Dissipated: June 11, 2026, 5:59 p.m. CDT (UTC–05:00)
- Duration: 27 minutes

EF3 tornado
- on the Enhanced Fujita scale
- Highest winds: 145 mph (233 km/h)

Overall effects
- Fatalities: 0
- Injuries: 7

This intense, multi-vortex tornado first touched down just south of Long Point in Livingston County at 5:32 pm CDT before moving just east of due north through the town, causing tree damage. More sporadic tree damage occurred as the tornado turned to the north-northeast, passed just east of Ancona, and crossed IL 17. As it reached and crossed IL 23 south of Streator the tornado intensified, blowing a grain bin off its foundation and dragging it along the ground for approximately 700 yd (640 m), possibly dragging a truck 200 yd (180 m) through a field, downing several power poles, and damaging crops. The tornado continued to intensify as it crossed the Vermillion River, and approached the La Salle County line, damaging more trees. A home was partially unroofed, with a trailer/camper flipped, and an outbuilding/garage destroyed; a nearby carport was also destroyed. Another home had most of its roof removed, almost all its windows broken, and it's front porch removed.

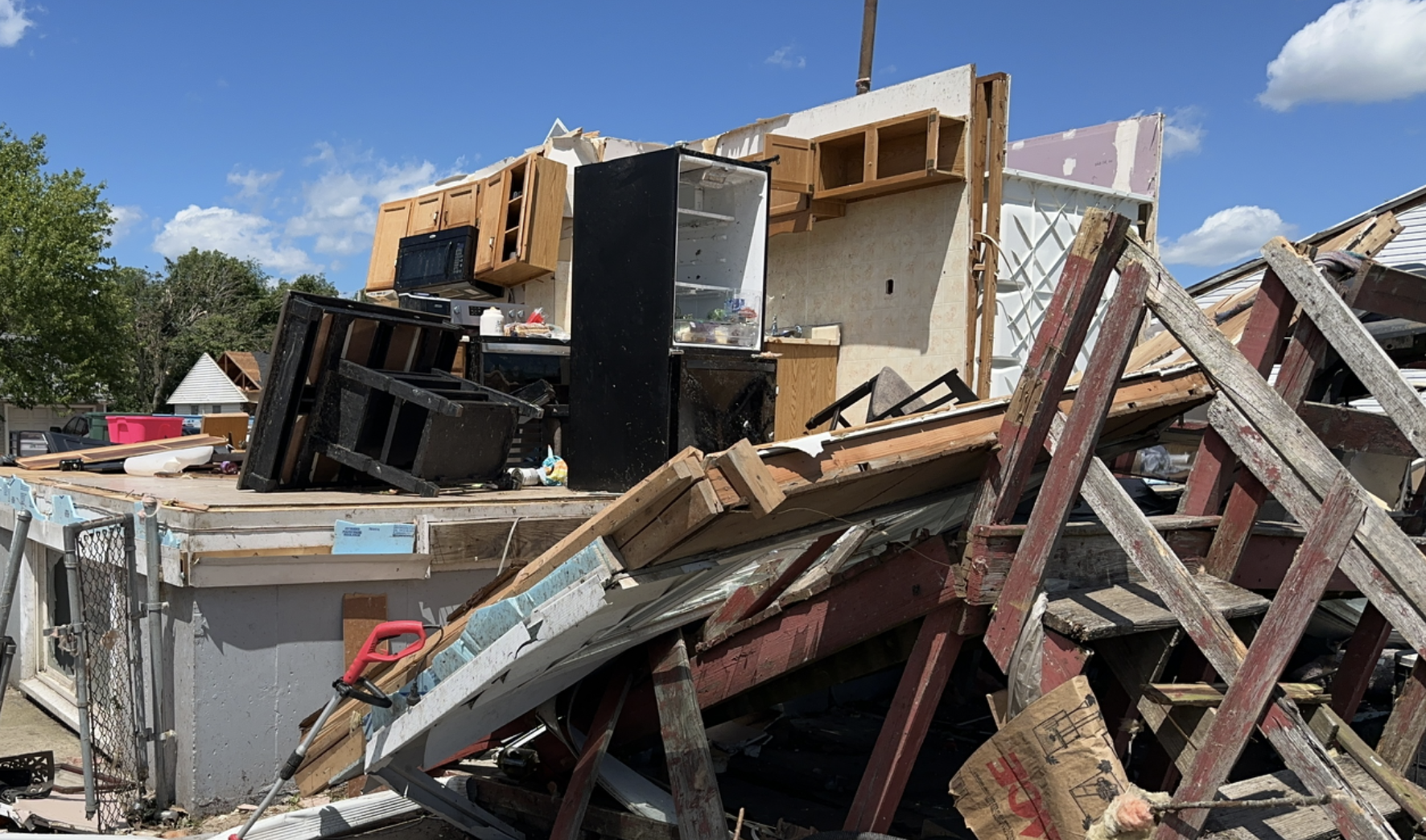
Low-end EF3 damage to a one-story house on a concrete basement foundation with all of the exterior walls collapsed

The tornado then reached its peak intensity as it crossed into LaSalle County and struck the southeastern part of Streator. Several poorly-anchored homes in a neighborhood were heavily damaged, including some that was left with only interior walls standing. One of the homes was given a low-end EF3 rating due to the debris being blown off the foundation; others received a maximum rating of high-end EF2 as the exterior walls just collapsed without being blown away. This included a home that was left with a single small room, with cars in an adjacent garage that was demolished sustaining broken windows. A man was injured at this residence after he became trapped in the debris and broke his ankle. Other homes suffered roof damage and trees were damaged as well. After turning northeastward and leaving swirl marks in a field, the tornado turned just east of due north as it crossed IL 18 and moved through the eastern part of Streator along East 19th Road at EF2 intensity with multiple homes suffering extensive roof damage and an outbuilding being destroyed.

Continuing northward at EF2 intensity, the tornado damaged or destroyed multiple outbuildings, leveled all but one steel-enforced section of a large garage, blew away six large grain silos, removed the top story of a two-story brick carriage house, and partially unroofed and tore off the back porch of another two-story home. Other nearby homes suffered roof damage, a caboose on railroad tracks was tipped over, and trees were also damaged. Northeast of Streator, a split-level single-family home was completely unroofed with multiple exterior walls removed, an external garage outbuilding was demolished, and softwood trees were snapped. The tornado then snapped power poles, snapped branches of trees, and almost completely unroofed and broke most of the windows of another home, with a garage being destroyed as a large trailer fell onto it. The tornado then weakened and dissipated shortly thereafter.

This tornado destroyed multiple homes and structures along its 27-minute-long path, with a total path length of 11.93 mi (19.20 km). It reached a maximum width of 600 yd (550 m), while damage surveys indicate the tornado peaked at low-end EF3 intensity with winds of 145 mph (233 km/h). Seven people were injured.

=== Merrillville–Hobart, Indiana ===
Merrillville–Hobart, Indiana
- The rain-wrapped tornado while dissipating near Hobart

Meteorological history
- Formed: June 11, 2026, 7:25 p.m. CDT (UTC–05:00)
- Dissipated: June 11, 2026, 7:37 p.m. CDT (UTC–05:00)
- Duration: 12 minutes

EF2 tornado
- on the Enhanced Fujita scale
- Highest winds: 120 mph (190 km/h)

Overall effects
- Fatalities: 0
- Injuries: 1

This strong and destructive tornado first touched down at 7:25 pm CDT in Ross Township in Lake County, just to the west of Hendricks Street. The tornado began to track northeastward as it strengthened to EF2 intensity, crossing Hendricks Street and entering western portions of Merrillville. The tornado tracked across West 63rd Pike and struck numerous homes, with several suffering EF2 damage and having their roofs torn away. The tornado then crossed West 63rd Avenue, inflicting EF2 damage to more homes on the north side of the road, with one having several exterior walls collapse. The tornado continued to track northeast as it crossed the CN Railway and entered more residential areas. An apartment building along West 61st Pike suffered EF2 damage to its roof, and several nearby homes were severely damaged. The tornado then crossed the road, damaging more homes at EF2 intensity before striking several homes at the Rutledge Street cul-de-sac. In this area, trees were snapped and several homes sustained major damage, with one residence suffering the worst damage from the tornado, having numerous exterior walls collapsed from estimated wind speeds of 120 mph (190 km/h). The tornado turned more to the east and inflicted damage to numerous homes along Taft Pike as it crossed, continuing through central Merrillville as it weakened to EF1 intensity, tracking over SR 55 as it damaged power poles and snapped trees.

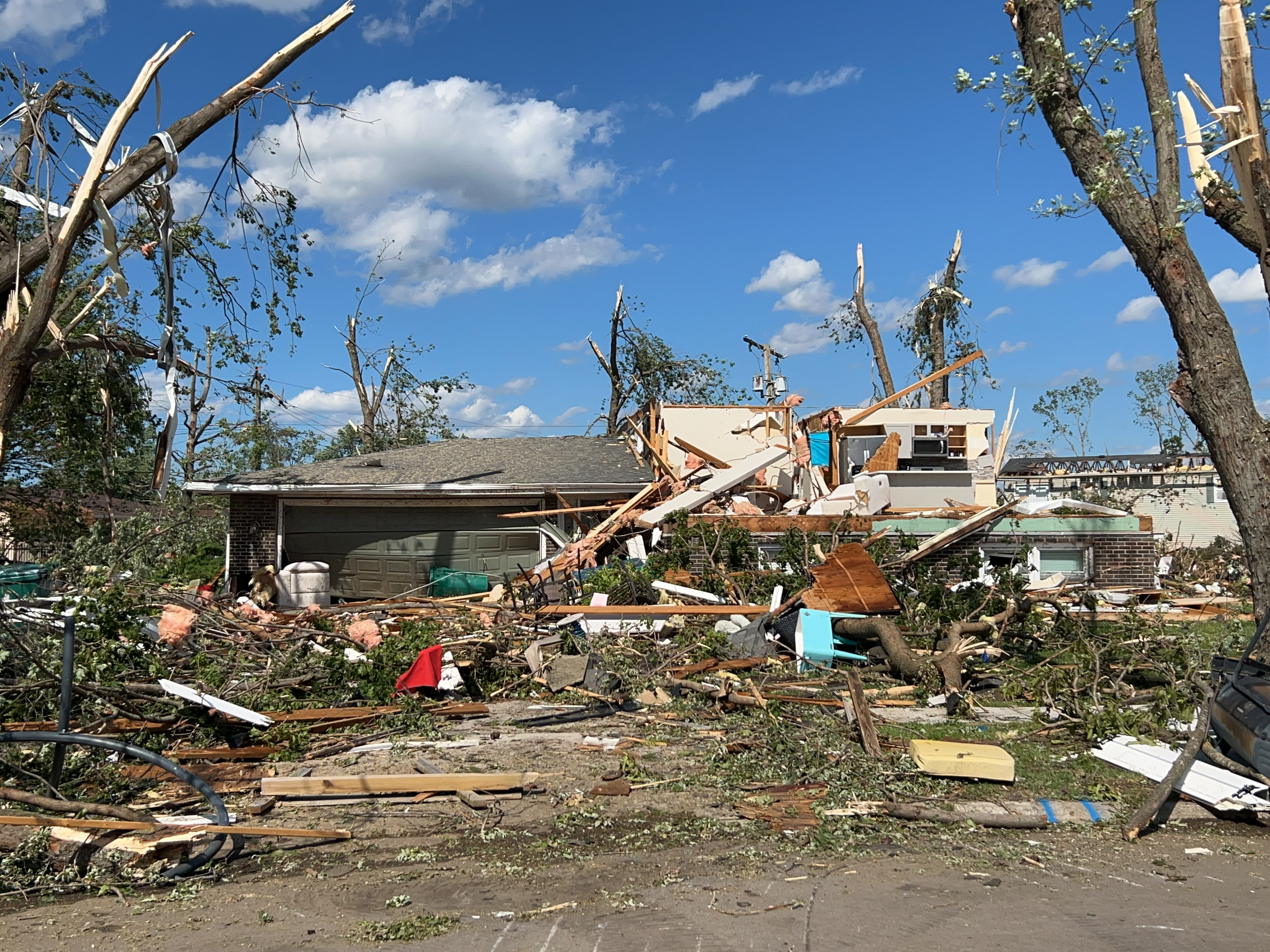
A home in Merrillville that was severely damaged at EF2 intensity

The tornado then crossed Cleveland Street and began to parallel West 61st Pike, inflicting EF1 damage to several homes and significantly damaging trees. The tornado turned to the northeast as it crossed West 61st Avenue just west of the West 61st Avenue/Hayes Street intersection, damaging more homes. The tornado then turned back to the east and crossed Grant Pike before briefly restrengthening to EF2 intensity along the eastern side of the road, where two homes suffered major damage. The tornado crossed Turkey Creek Branch before striking Harrison Middle School at EF1 intensity, tearing sections of the roofing over the gymnasium away. The tornado then curved to the southeast as it weakened to EF0 intensity, inflicting minor damage to homes and trees as it paralleled West 61st Avenue. The tornado tracked just north of Fieler Elementary School before turning to the northeast, crossing three residential streets and inflicting EF1 damage to homes and trees. The tornado then struck several multi-residential structures as it crossed Washington Street, causing roof damage. The tornado damaged several businesses and snapped power poles along SR 53 before tracking over the Andrean High School campus. The school had the majority of its roof membrane torn off, and several sections of room decking were removed. A large amount of windows were shattered, including the majority of the ones along the eastern side of the school, and nearby trees suffered significant damage. Just to the north of the school, several homes and multi-residential structures sustained roof damage.

The tornado crossed East 58th Avenue and entered a forested area, uprooting hardwood trees at EF1 intensity. The tornado tracked across I-65 and inflicted EF0 damage in residential areas just north of Glenwood Park, with shingles being removed from homes and trees being damaged. The tornado continued through forested areas, downing and damaging numerous trees before tracking over Lake George into southwestern portions of Hobart. The tornado inflicted EF0 damage to trees as it crossed the South Wisconsin Street bridge over Lake George before dissipating at 7:37 p.m. CDT after entering Lakeview Park, just south of the Norfolk Southern Railway. Along its track, the tornado damaged or destroyed around 200 homes and buildings, with one person being injured. The tornado reached a maximum width of 700 yards (640 m) and tracked for 6.55 miles (10.54 km).

=== Hebron–Kouts–South Wanatah, Indiana ===
Hebron–Kouts–South Wanatah, Indiana
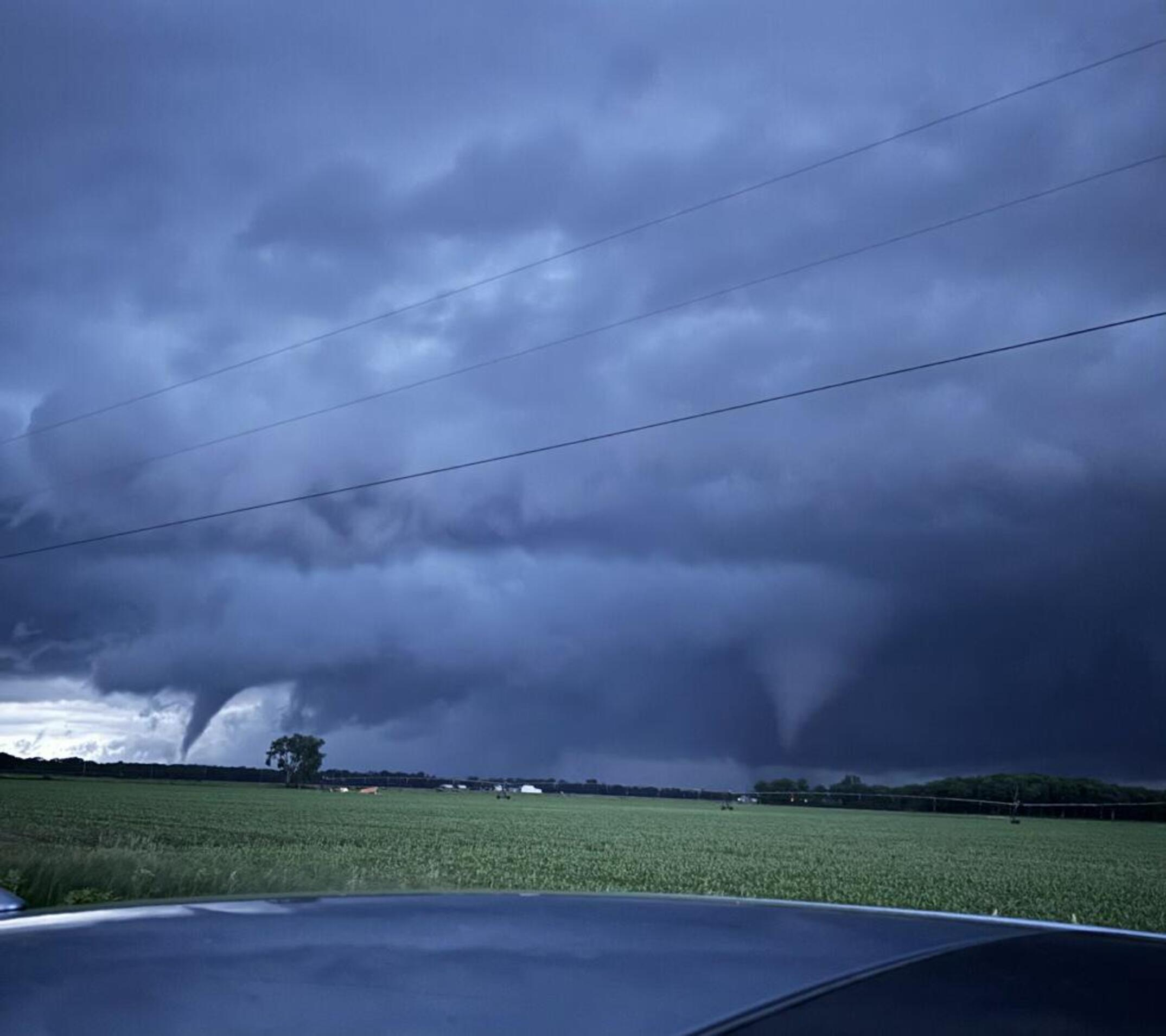
- Twin tornadoes north of Kouts, Indiana; The tornado on the right is the EF3 tornado

Meteorological history
- Formed: June 11, 2026, 7:48 p.m. CDT (UTC–05:00)
- Dissipated: June 11, 2026, 8:24 p.m. CDT (UTC–05:00)
- Duration: 36 minutes

EF3 tornado
- on the Enhanced Fujita scale
- Highest winds: 165 mph (266 km/h)

Overall effects
- Fatalities: 0
- Injuries: 0

While an ongoing EF0 tornado at the time was traversing through areas north of Shelby, the parent supercell put down a new tornado south of the initial tornado on Clay Street, southeast of the Apple Valley Estates mobile home park in Lake County. The tornado moved northeast, causing EF0 damage to trees and minor damage to crop fields. Additional but weak tree damage occurred as soon as the second tornado entered Porter County, with the EF0 tornado that preceded it soon dissipating after the two tornadoes tracked alongside each other for approximately 10 minutes.

Crossing US 231, the succeeding tornado strengthened to EF2 intensity as it snapped trunks off trees, before weakening to EF1 strength after it tracked through open farmland again. Persistent EF0-EF1 damage continued as the tornado moved past the south and east of Hebron, impacting many farmsteads and tree groves. Cycloidal marks were also produced by the tornado in this region. The tornado then approached Kouts from the west before moving northeast, striking a neighborhood but causing insignificant levels of damage.

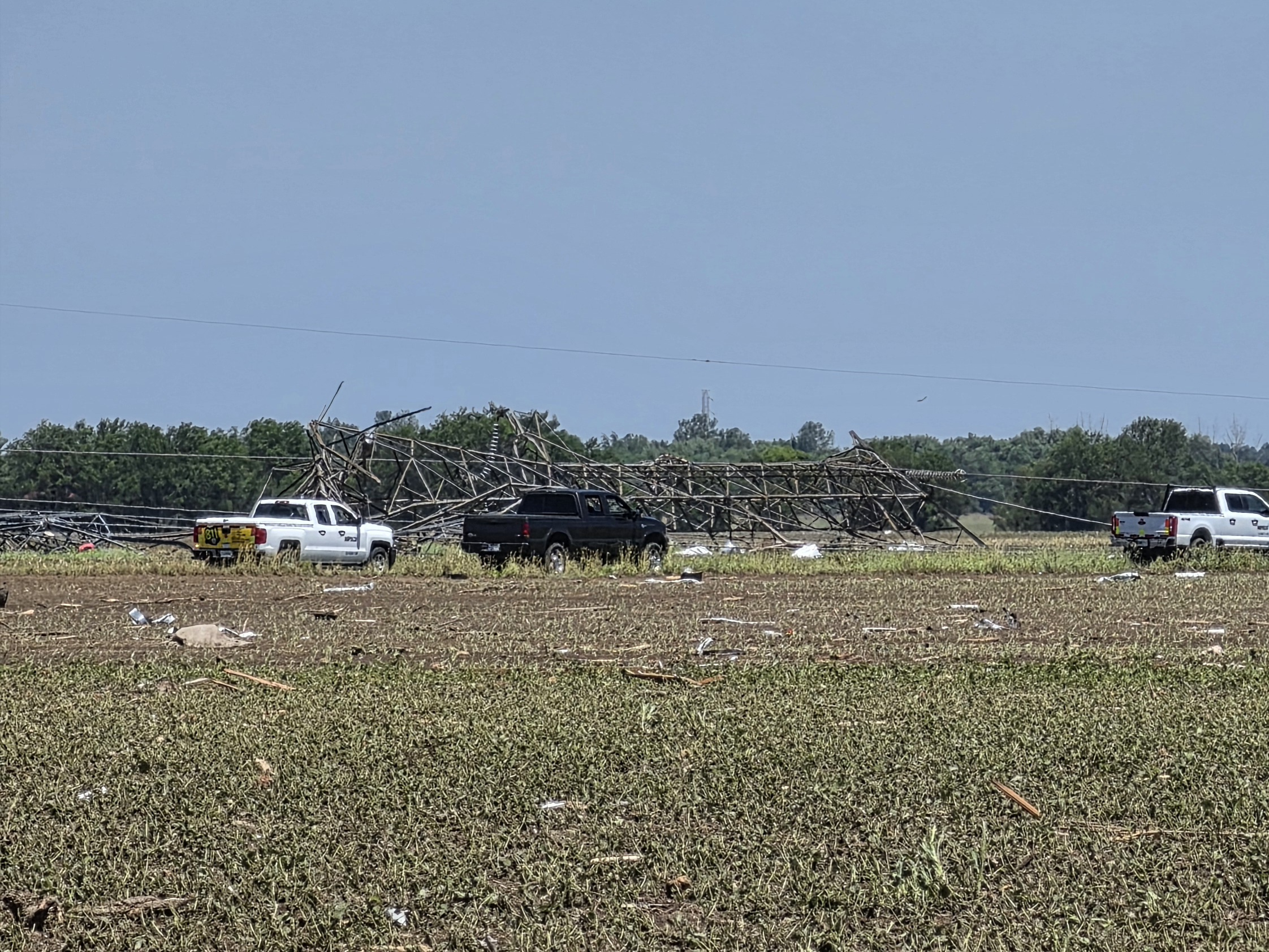
A transmission tower that was completely totaled by the tornado

After leaving the residential areas, the tornado began to rapidly intensify as it entered an open field, before causing EF3 damage to a home along IN 49 due north of Kouts. Traversing more open fields and leaving more cycloidal marks behind, the tornado encroached on a homestead on South 300 East. A farmhouse was completely leveled at high-end EF3 intensity, with EF3 tree damage inflicted as well as debarking occurred. EF2 damage was caused to a large storage outbuilding, with one pickup truck flipped and farm machinery damaged. Crossing over East 600 South, the intense tornado downed and sheared two transmission towers at high-end EF3 intensity. Swirling in fields was yet again noted as the tornado reached this exact point. The storm continued through open fields at a weakened state of EF2 strength as it moved through eastern Porter County. Just west of the Porter–La Porte County line, the intense tornado destroyed another farmhouse at low-end EF3 strength before the storm spawned a brief EFU tornado to the south of this one. It then weakened before crossing the county line into La Porte County, where the tornado weakened to EF1 strength, before occluding to north to the south of South Wanatah and dissipating.

This was the strongest tornado of the outbreak, with maximum estimated winds of 165 mph (266 km/h). The tornado was on the ground for 36 minutes, carved a path 22.28 mi (35.86 km) long and 450 yd (410 m) wide. No injuries or fatalities were reported from this tornado.

== Non-tornadic effects ==
=== Derecho ===
Multiple lines of thunderstorms were produced throughout the event, the most powerful of which was classified as a derecho. Through much of the afternoon on June 10, the derecho traveled a total of 438 miles (705 km) and 98,776 square miles (255,830 km^{2}) across the states of Iowa, Illinois, southern Wisconsin, and western Michigan. The maximum wind gust recorded from the derecho was a peak wind gust of 94 mph (151 km/h) at Wittman Regional Airport in Oshkosh, Wisconsin.

=== Other impacts ===
A man was found critically injured and would later die at a homeless encampment in Des Moines after a tree fell on him due to non-tornadic winds. The severe weather on June 10–11 delayed numerous Amtrak trains with the westbound and eastbound California Zephyr trains being delayed almost 20 hours and over 12 hours, respectively, with other trains experiencing 1–3.5 hour long delays.

Further east, severe storms in Maryland on June 11 caused two deaths. Quarter sized hail was observed as far east as Sherman, Connecticut.

== Aftermath ==
On June 17, the commissioners of Lake County, Indiana approved a disaster declaration following the storms. There were 2 fatalities and 21 injuries reported by the SPC, most of which on June 11th.

== See also ==
- Weather of 2026
- List of derecho events
- List of F3, EF3, and IF3 tornadoes (2020–present)
- List of North American tornadoes and tornado outbreaks
- List of United States tornadoes from May to June 2026
- List of Canadian tornadoes in 2026
- Tornado outbreak and derecho of June 21–22, 2026 – A tornado outbreak that occurred 2 weeks later in similar areas
