= Boone Township, Porter County, Indiana =

Boone Township
- Township
- Coordinates: 41°18′35″N 87°09′05″W
- Country: United States
- State: Indiana
- County: Porter

Government
  - Type: Indiana township

Area
  - Total: 36.24 sq mi (93.85 km^{2})
  - Land: 36.20 sq mi (93.76 km^{2})
  - Water: 0.035 sq mi (0.09 km^{2})
- Elevation: 682 ft (208 m)

Population (2020)
  - Total: 6,104
  - Density: 170/sq mi (65.7/km^{2})
- Time zone: UTC-6 (Central (CST))
  - Summer (DST): UTC-5 (CDT)
- ZIP code: 46992
- Area code: 219
- FIPS code: 18-06580
- GNIS feature ID: 453130

Boone Township is one of twelve townships in Porter County, Indiana. As of the 2010 census, its population was 6,160.

== History ==
Boone Township was organized in 1836.

Historical population
Census	Pop.	Note	%±
1890	1,357		—
1900	1,373		1.2%
1910	1,403		2.2%
1920	1,430		1.9%
1930	1,265		−11.5%
1940	1,585		25.3%
1950	1,882		18.7%
1960	2,308		22.6%
1970	2,715		17.6%
1980	4,492		65.5%
1990	4,909		9.3%
2000	5,884		19.9%
2010	6,160		4.7%
2020	6,104		−0.9%

The Clinton D. Gilson Barn was listed on the National Register of Historic Places in 1984.

== Cities and towns ==
The largest community in the township is Hebron.

== Education ==
Boone Township is served by the Metropolitan School District of Boone Township. Their high school is Hebron High School.

== Cemeteries ==
Name	Location	Picture	Ref pg	Ref pg
Hebron Cemetery	900 S and US 231, Hebron		pg 47	back
Cornell Cemetery	North of State Route 8, must north of 350W		pg 53	back
