= Eli Sigler House =

Historic house in Indiana, United States

- U.S. National Register of Historic Places
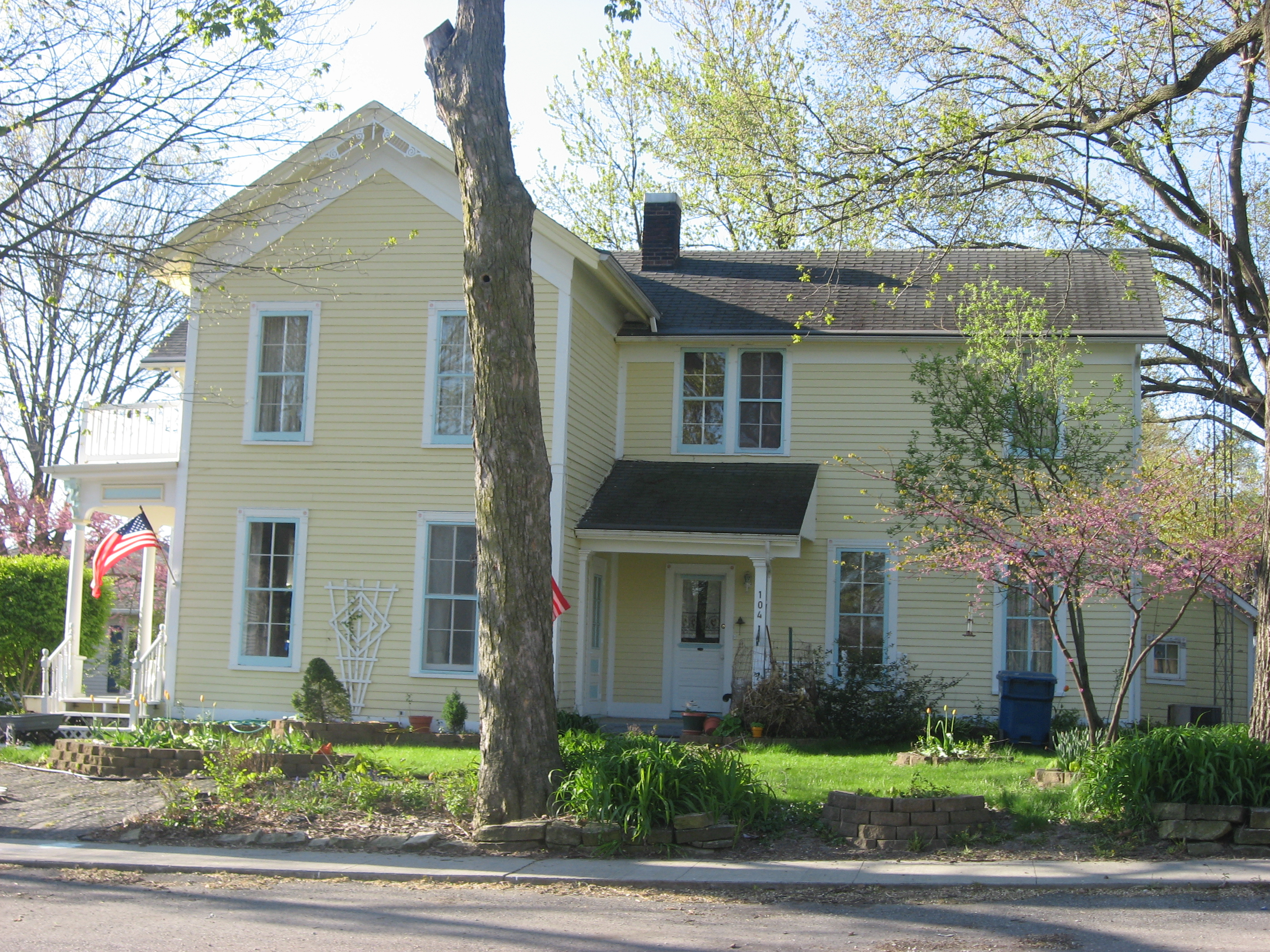
- Eli Sigler House, April 2012

- Location within Indiana Location within the United States
- Location: 104 W. Church St., Hebron, Indiana
- Coordinates: 41°19′03″N 87°12′01″W
- Area: 0.25 acres (0.10 ha)
- Built: c. 1867, 1935
- Architect: Dunn, Lyman
- Architectural style: Greek Revival, Italianate
- NRHP reference No.: 11000124
- Added to NRHP: March 21, 2011

Eli Sigler House, also known as the John Sigler House, is a historic home located at Hebron, Indiana. It was built about 1867, and is a two-story, vernacular frame dwelling with Greek Revival and Italianate style design elements. It has a gabled ell plan and a large two-story addition constructed about 1935.

It was listed on the National Register of Historic Places in 2011.

== History ==
The first pioneer to settle in Hebron arrived in 1836, settling at the crossroads of the north–south trail with an east–west trail, today's Sigler Street. Known as “The Corners.”, the town first house was the log cabin of ‘Bagley’ in 1845. The frame stagecoach stop was building in 1849 and the town was platted in 1855. The Sigler house is (0.125 miles (0.201 km)) south of the downtown at the corner of Main Street (U.S. 231) and Church Street. The house was built during Hebron's early years for a local businessman, Eli Sigler by Lyman Dunn, a local carpenter. The house is a contemporary Greek Revival and Italianate style using a gabled ell.

== Family ==
Eli Sigler was for many years a merchant at Hebron. In politics he was a republican but made no effort to gain election to any office. His wife was very much interested in the Methodist Episcopal Church. John A. Sigler enlisted in Company I of the Fifth Indiana Cavalry, in January 1864 and was mustered out at Indianapolis in August 1865. He had attended the local schools. After the war he established a general store at Kouts Station. Then a hardware business at Hebron several years.
