= Metropolitan School District of Boone Township =

School district in Indiana

Address
- 307 South Main Street Hebron, Indiana, 46341; United States

District information
- Type: Public
- Grades: K–12
- NCES District ID: 1800750

Students and staff
- Students: 1,071
- Teachers: 69.02 (FTE)
- Staff: 148.0 (FTE)
- Student–teacher ratio: 15.52

Other information
- Website: www.hebronschools.k12.in.us

The Metropolitan School District of Boone Township is the school system that serves Boone Township, Porter County, Indiana, USA. Boone Township's largest and only town is Hebron, Indiana. Jeff Brooks is the superintendent.

== Schools ==
- Hebron High School
- Hebron Middle School
- Hebron Elementary School
