= Sue Landske =

American politician

Member of the Indiana Senate from the 6th district
- In office November 7, 1984 – November 5, 2014
- Preceded by: Ernest F. Niemeyer
- Succeeded by: Rick Niemeyer

Personal details
- Born: September 3, 1937 Evanston, Illinois, U.S.
- Died: February 27, 2015 (aged 77) Cedar Lake, Indiana, U.S.
- Party: Republican
- Spouse: William
- Education: Indiana University

Military service
- Allegiance: United States: Indiana
- Branch/service: Indiana Guard Reserve
- Rank: Captain

Dorothy Suzanne "Sue" Landske (September 3, 1937 – February 27, 2015) was a Republican member of the Indiana State Senate who represented the 6th district. Landske was Center Township Assessor from 1978 to 1984. She joined the Indiana State Senate in 1984 and served until her retirement for health reasons in 2014. During her final term, Landske served as the Assistant President Pro Tempore.

Landske was a retired captain in the Indiana Guard Reserve.

Landske died of cancer on February 27, 2015, at the age of 77.
