= Clinton D. Gilson Barn =

- U.S. National Register of Historic Places
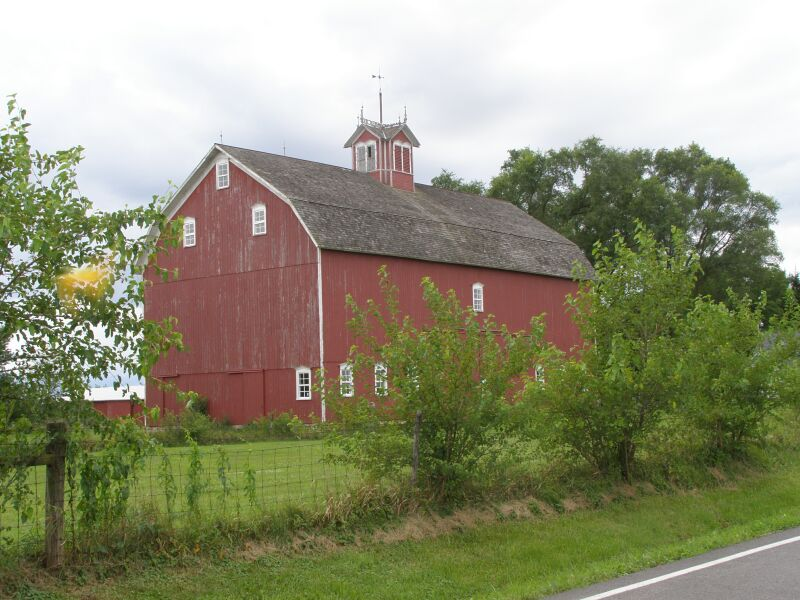
- Clinton D. Gilson Barn

- Location within Indiana Location within the United States
- Nearest city: Hebron, Indiana
- Coordinates: 41°20′22″N 87°9′59″W
- Area: 1 acre (0.40 ha)
- Built: 1892
- Built by: Gilson, Clinton David
- NRHP reference No.: 84001229
- Added to NRHP: September 20, 1984

The Clinton D. Gilson Farm is an outstanding example of a vernacular constructed farmstead for the late 19th century. The farm consists of outbuildings, the English barn, brooder houses, and a machine shop. The farm is located 3.5 miles (5.6 km) northeast of Hebron, Indiana. The Clinton D. Gilson Barn was built in 1892 and is on the National Register of Historic Places. It is the dominant structure on the Gilson Farm. A windmill was once located on the west end of the barn and an elevator on the east end.

== Exterior ==
The barn is a gambrel-roofed frame building. The barn is 80 feet (24 m) long by 40 feet (12 m) and 44 feet (13 m) high. The eaves are 27 feet (8.2 m) above the ground. A cupola is centered on the roof. The exterior of the barn was originally red siding with white trim along the roof and down the corners. In the 1950s a white gypsum siding was placed over the original wood siding. The foundation is built of cut stone hauled from Joliet Prison in Joliet, Illinois. There are two large sliding doors located in the middle of the north and south walls. These doors have been altered from their original position and several small doors have been added. All the windows are original. Each is a pedimented, double-hung sash windows with six over six lights. Fourteen are on the lower half of the barn (North 6, East 1, South 6, West 1) with the remaining 8 higher on the walls. A number of fixed sash windows were added in the 1950s, but have been removed by the summer of 2014. The gambrel roof is covered with cedar shake shingles. The cupola has shuttered windows all four directions with four gables. A metal trim tops each gable.

== Interior ==
The interior of the barn contains 12" x 12" pegged beams. The main floor is at ground level and divided east and west into two sections. The east area has used for milk cows and is whitewashed; the west area housed horses and young cattle. The upper level consists of several haymow areas and still contains a hook used in the transporting of hay. Gas pipe for the original gas lamps is still in place; several lamps are in storage. When the barn was used for housed cows and horses, the upper floor was used to store up to 100 long tons (100 t) of hay. It was loaded into the mow by a horse-drawn elevator.

== Significance ==
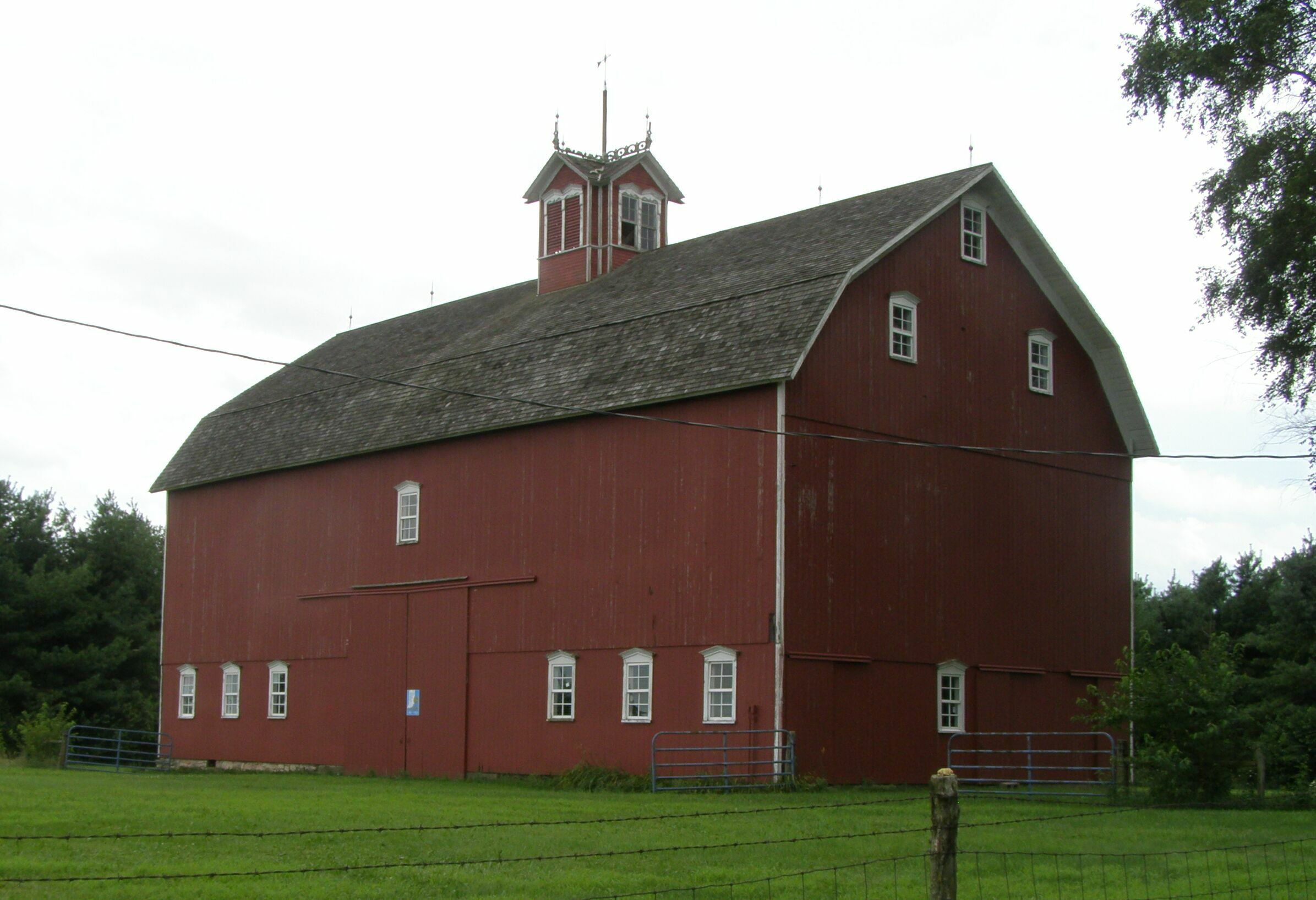
Gilson Farm is an outstanding example of a vernacular constructed farmstead for the late 19th Century.

The Gilson Barn is significant as one of the largest and most elaborate barns in Porter County, and as a representation of the work of Clinton D. Gilson, the original owner and builder. The barn took a year to build. It was constructed in 16 feet (4.9 m) sections and lifted into position by a pulley system pulled by a steam engine. Clinton Gilson was the builder hand traveled, with a crew, houses and barns. He installed a windmill to grind feed, an elevator to transport hay to the haymow, and gas lamps and piping: Two other barns in Boone Township have been identified Gilson barns. Neither the Maplehurst Farm Barn and the Arthur Gilson Barn have ornamental features.
