= Rick Niemeyer =

American politician

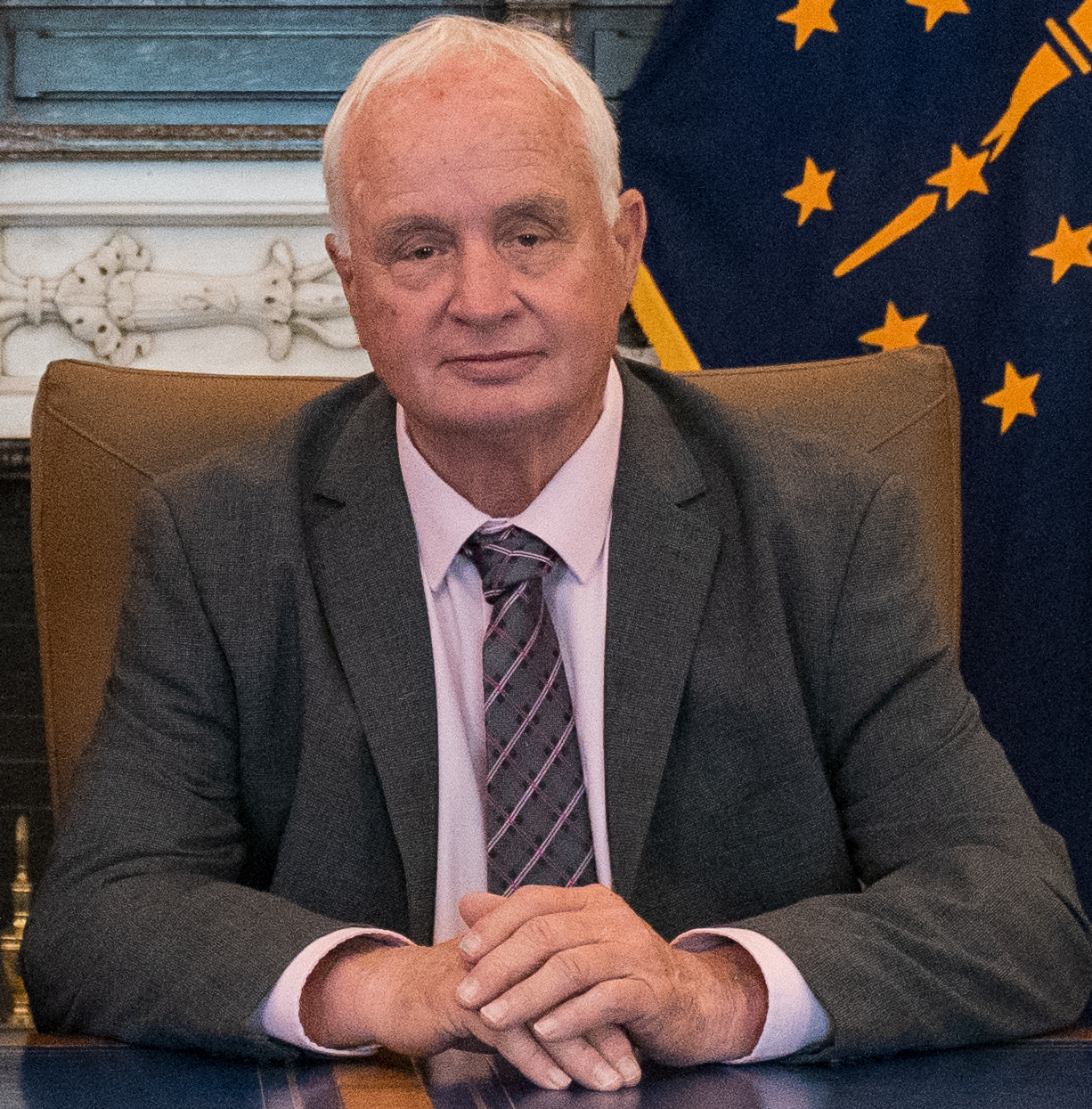

Member of the Indiana Senate from the 6th district
- In office November 5, 2014 – November 4, 2026
- Preceded by: Sue Landske
- Succeeded by: Jay Starkey

Member of the Indiana House of Representatives from the 11th district
- In office 2012–2014
- Preceded by: Dan Stevenson
- Succeeded by: Michael Aylesworth

Personal details
- Party: Republican
- Spouse: Connie
- Education: Indiana State University

Rick Niemeyer is a Republican member of the Indiana State Senate, elected in 2014. Representing the 6th district since November 14, 2014, Niemeyer also previously served one term in Indiana House of Representatives for district 11, from 2012 to 2014.

In 2025, Niemeyer drew national attention as one of 21 Republican senators to vote against mid-decade redistricting in Indiana, which would have net Republicans an additional 2 seats in the U.S. House of Representatives, prompting criticism from national and state Republicans.

In 2026, Niemeyer lost renomination to Jay Starkey, 43.9%–56.1%

== Personal life and career ==
Niemeyer is the owner and operator of Lowell Livestock Auction, and a managing broker of Niemeyer Realty. He is also an auctioneer and owner of Niemeyer Auction Services.

After the retirement of 30-year incumbent Sue Landske, Niemeyer opted to run for the Republican nomination for her old seat. After winning the Republican nomination, he went on to win on the November 4 general election.

In 2026, Niemeyer ran for re-election to the Indiana Senate. He lost re-nomination to Jay Starkey.

== Sources ==
- Indiana House bio
- Vote Smart bio of Niemeyer
- http://ballotpedia.org/Rick_Niemeyer
