= Jay Starkey =

American politician

Member of the Indiana Senate from the 6th district
- Incumbent
- Assumed office November 4, 2026
- Preceded by: Rick Niemeyer

Personal details
- Party: Republican

Jay Starkey is an American politician who is the member of the Indiana State Senate from the 6th district since 2026.
