= Rocklane, Indiana =

- Unincorporated community
- Location within Indiana Location within the United States
- Coordinates: 39°36′35″N 86°00′45″W
- Country: United States
- State: Indiana
- County: Johnson
- Township: Clark
- Elevation: 814 ft (248 m)
- ZIP code: 46143
- FIPS code: 18-65466
- GNIS feature ID: 442221

Rocklane is an unincorporated community in Clark Township, Johnson County, Indiana.

== History ==
A post office was established at Rocklane in 1873, and remained in operation until it was discontinued in 1902. The name Rocklane might indicate that their soil is rocky.
