= Terre Haute, Missouri =

Unincorporated community in Missouri, United States

Coordinates: 40°26′22″N 93°14′03″W

Terre Haute is an extinct town in Putnam County, in the U.S. state of Missouri. The GNIS classifies it as a populated place.

Terre Haute was platted in 1858, and named after Terre Haute, Indiana. A post office called Terre Haute was established in 1862, and remained in operation until 1891. The community once contained a schoolhouse, the Terre Haute School.
