= Hebron High School (Indiana) =

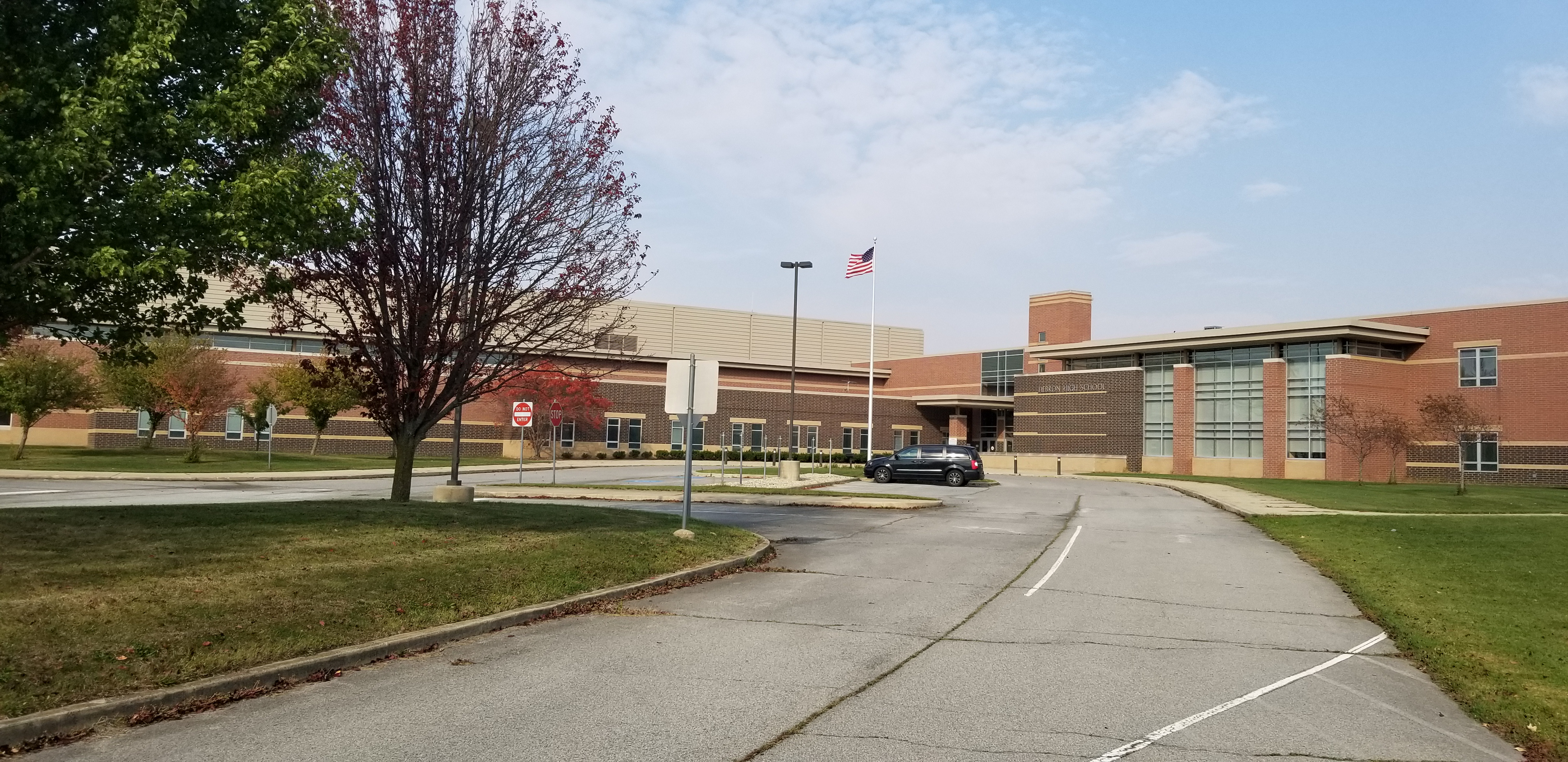

Location
- 509 South Main Street; Hebron, Porter County, Indiana 46341; United States; 41°18′57.85″N 87°11′56.12″W

Information
- Type: Public high school
- School district: MSD of Boone Township
- Superintendent: Jeff Brooks
- Principal: Allyson Kaegi
- Teaching staff: 25.50 (FTE)
- Grades: 9-12
- Enrollment: 339 (2023–2024)
- Student to teacher ratio: 13.29
- Color
- Athletics conference: Porter County Conference
- Team name: Hawks
- Website: Main Site

Hebron High School is a four-star public high school located in Hebron, Indiana. The school is operated by the MSD of Boone Township, also known as Hebron Schools. As of the 2023–24 school year, there were 339 students enrolled. The student:faculty ratio is approximately 10:1.

== Athletics ==
Hebron High school's team name is the Hawks. They operate within the Porter County Conference.

== See also ==
- List of high schools in Indiana
