= Hebron, Indiana =

- Town
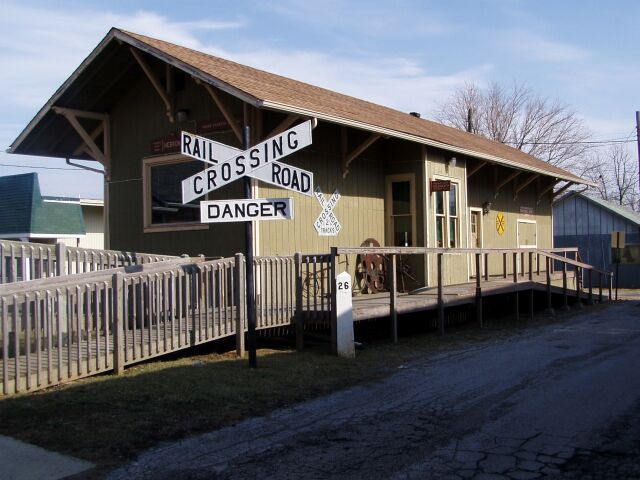
- Former Pittsburgh, Cincinnati, Chicago and St. Louis Railroad station in Hebron

- Seal
- Motto: "A Community Working Together"
- Location in Indiana Hebron, Indiana (the United States)
- Coordinates: 41°19′30″N 87°12′07″W
- Country: United States
- State: Indiana
- County: Porter
- Township: Boone
- Established: 1849

Government
  - Type: Town Council
  - President: John Spinks Jr (D)

Area
  - Total: 2.00 sq mi (5.18 km^{2})
  - Land: 2.00 sq mi (5.18 km^{2})
  - Water: 0 sq mi (0.00 km^{2})
- Elevation: 692 ft (211 m)

Population (2020)
  - Total: 3,755
  - Density: 1,951.2/sq mi (753.35/km^{2})
- Time zone: UTC-6 (CST)
  - Summer (DST): UTC-5 (CDT)
- ZIP code: 46341
- Area code: 219
- FIPS code: 18-32818
- GNIS feature ID: 2396993
- Website: www.hebronindiana.org

Hebron is a town in Boone Township, Porter County, Indiana, United States. The population was 3,755 as of the 2020 census.

== History ==
The first settler to Hebron was Judge Jesse Johnson (1st Judge of the Porter County Probate Court. The area of Hebron was an open prairie interspersed with small groves of trees. The prairie was about 2.5 miles (4.0 km) long by 0.75 miles (1.21 km) wide. About 0.5 miles (0.80 km) south was the Potawatomi village of Hauakiki. Locally the village was called "Indian Town."

The area chosen for settlement was referred to as "The Corners" as this was where two roads crossed. Hebron was laid out in 1841. The first homes were of log construction. In 1849, Mr. McCune built the "Tavern" as the first frame structure. The tavern continued in use as a tavern until 1936. In 1838, a Rev. Hannan organized the Bethlehem Church of Associate Reform Presbyterians. Later the church changed its name from "Bethlehem" to "Hebron." In 1845, Rev. Blain of the Hebron Church of Associate Reform Presbyterians petitioned for a post office named after his church. The post office was established that year and the town got its name.

In 1849, 1852, 1855, and 1864 lots were laid out to the west and south of "The Corners." It took the construction of the Pittsburgh, Cincinnati, Chicago and St. Louis Railroad in 1863 to open the town to growth. Completed just to support the Union effort during the American Civil War, the railroad spurred growth after the war ended. Hebron became a gateway to the rich hunting grounds of the Grand Kankakee Marsh.

The community was granted status as a "Town" on March 5, 1890. The advent of the draining of the Grand Kankakee Marsh in 1890 increased the traffic and the population of the entire area. Another spurt of growth occurred from 1900 to 1912 when the Hebron Opera House was built. By 1936, three passenger trains a day passed through Hebron headed for Chicago, making access to world markets possible.

The Eli Sigler House was listed on the National Register of Historic Places in 2011.

== Geography ==
According to the 2010 census, Hebron has a total area of 2.0 square miles (5.18 km^{2}), all land.

== Demographics ==
Historical population
Census	Pop.	Note	%±
1880	715		—
1890	689		−3.6%
1900	794		15.2%
1910	821		3.4%
1920	832		1.3%
1930	693		−16.7%
1940	949		36.9%
1950	1,010		6.4%
1960	1,401		38.7%
1970	1,624		15.9%
1980	2,696		66.0%
1990	3,183		18.1%
2000	3,596		13.0%
2010	3,724		3.6%
2020	3,755		0.8%
Source: US Census Bureau

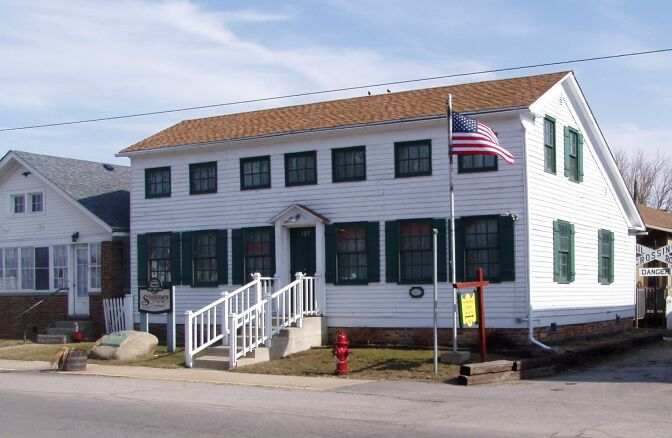
The Stagecoach Inn, built in 1849, is now a local history museum

=== 2020 census ===
As of the 2020 census, Hebron had a population of 3,755. The median age was 36.7 years. 25.8% of residents were under the age of 18 and 13.4% of residents were 65 years of age or older. For every 100 females there were 95.0 males, and for every 100 females age 18 and over there were 94.5 males age 18 and over.

0.0% of residents lived in urban areas, while 100.0% lived in rural areas.

There were 1,481 households in Hebron, of which 35.0% had children under the age of 18 living in them. Of all households, 44.4% were married-couple households, 19.9% were households with a male householder and no spouse or partner present, and 28.2% were households with a female householder and no spouse or partner present. About 27.4% of all households were made up of individuals and 11.2% had someone living alone who was 65 years of age or older.

There were 1,570 housing units, of which 5.7% were vacant. The homeowner vacancy rate was 0.6% and the rental vacancy rate was 9.3%.

Racial composition as of the 2020 census
Race	Number	Percent
White	3,321	88.4%
Black or African American	77	2.1%
American Indian and Alaska Native	6	0.2%
Asian	15	0.4%
Native Hawaiian and Other Pacific Islander	0	0.0%
Some other race	66	1.8%
Two or more races	270	7.2%
Hispanic or Latino (of any race)	332	8.8%

=== 2010 census ===
As of the census of 2010, there were 3,724 people, 1,449 households, and 990 families living in the town. The population density was 1,880.8 inhabitants per square mile (726.2/km^{2}). There were 1,539 housing units at an average density of 777.3 per square mile (300.1/km^{2}). The racial makeup of the town was 95.9% White, 1.1% African American, 0.2% Native American, 0.4% Asian, 0.0025% Canadian, 0.9% from other races, and 1.6% from two or more races. Hispanic or Latino of any race were 6.1% of the population.

There were 1,449 households, of which 37.5% had children under the age of 18 living with them, 50.6% were married couples living together, 12.8% had a female householder with no husband present, 4.9% had a male householder with no wife present, and 31.7% were non-families. 27.5% of all households were made up of individuals, and 11.1% had someone living alone who was 65 years of age or older. The average household size was 2.57 and the average family size was 3.15.

The median age in the town was 33.6 years. 27.4% of residents were under the age of 18; 8.5% were between the ages of 18 and 24; 30% were from 25 to 44; 23.3% were from 45 to 64; and 10.7% were 65 years of age or older. The gender makeup of the town was 48.3% male and 51.7% female.

=== 2000 census ===
As of the census of 2000, there were 3,596 people, 1,410 households, and 984 families living in the town. The population density was 2,321.5 inhabitants per square mile (896.3/km^{2}). There were 1,456 housing units at an average density of 940.0 per square mile (362.9/km^{2}). The racial makeup of the town was 96.38% White, 0.28% African American, 0.11% Native American, 0.28% Asian, 1.28% from other races, and 1.67% from two or more races. Hispanic or Latino of any race were 4.12% of the population.

There were 1,410 households, out of which 38.6% had children under the age of 18 living with them, 54.4% were married couples living together, 11.0% had a female householder with no husband present, and 30.2% were non-families. 27.5% of all households were made up of individuals, and 12.8% had someone living alone who was 65 years of age or older. The average household size was 2.55 and the average family size was 3.12.

In the town, the population was spread out, with 29.0% under the age of 18, 9.8% from 18 to 24, 29.7% from 25 to 44, 19.3% from 45 to 64, and 12.3% who were 65 years of age or older. The median age was 33 years. For every 100 females, there were 91.9 males. For every 100 females age 18 and over, there were 89.6 males.

=== Income and poverty ===
According to the 2020 census, the median income for a household in the town was $70,500. The median income for a family was $101,341, and the median income for married-couple families was $117,599. About 6.2% of the population were below the poverty line, including 14.6% of those under age 18 and 3.7% of those age 65 or over.

== Education ==
There are three public schools in Hebron: Hebron High School, Hebron Middle School, and Hebron Elementary School. Jeff Brooks is the superintendent of the Metropolitan School District of Boone Township. Hebron Christian Academy is also in the community.

Hebron has a branch of the Porter County Public Library System.

== Notable people ==
- Mike Aylesworth-Indiana State Representative
- Johnny Mantz - Indy car driver
- Chad Patrick - MLB Pitcher
- James "Jay" Starkey-Indiana State Senator
- Chris Wallace (musician) - Singer
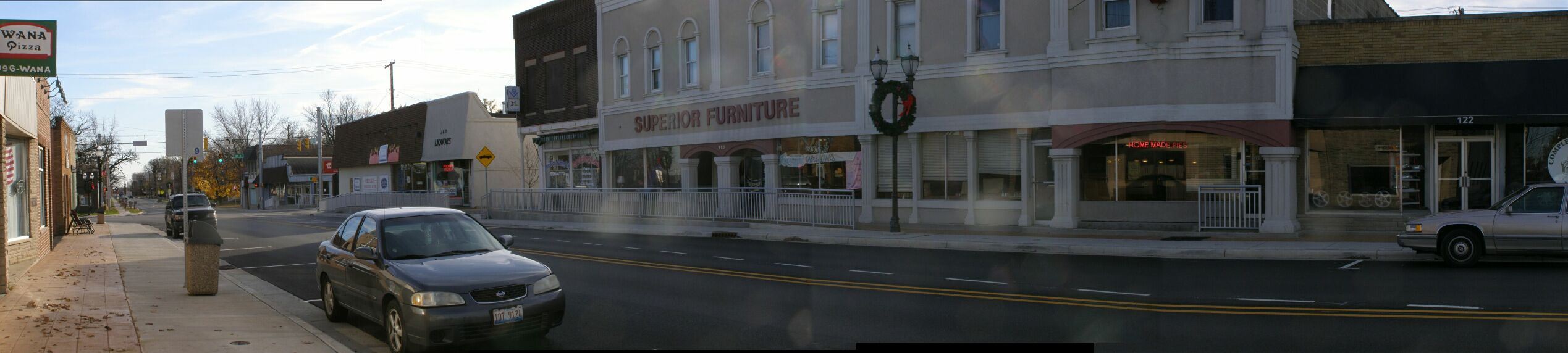
Downtown Hebron
