= National Register of Historic Places listings in Porter County, Indiana =

Location of Porter County in Indiana

This is a list of the National Register of Historic Places listings in Porter County, Indiana.

This is intended to be a complete list of the properties and districts on the National Register of Historic Places in Porter County, Indiana, United States. Latitude and longitude coordinates are provided for many National Register properties and districts; these locations may be seen together in a map.

There are 43 properties and districts listed on the National Register in the county, including one National Historic Landmark.

Properties and districts located in incorporated areas display the name of the municipality, while properties and districts in unincorporated areas display the name of their civil township. Properties and districts split between multiple jurisdictions display the names of all jurisdictions.

This National Park Service list is complete through NPS recent listings posted May 22, 2026.

== Current listings ==
	Name on the Register	Image	Date listed	Location	City or town	Description
1	Joseph Bailly Homestead	Joseph Bailly Homestead	October 15, 1966 (#66000005)	West of Porter on U.S. Route 20 on the Indiana Dunes National Lakeshore; 41°37′23″N 87°05′39″W	Porter	Joseph Bailly acquired the Homestead and surrounding lands during the 1830s when the Calumet was opened to white settlement. When he died in 1835, the Homestead went to his wife.
2	Bartlett Real Estate Office	Bartlett Real Estate Office	March 23, 2004 (#04000208)	500 S. Broadway; 41°40′24″N 86°59′12″W	Beverly Shores	Within Indiana Dunes National Park.
3	Beverly Shores South Shore Railroad Station	Beverly Shores South Shore Railroad Station	July 19, 1989 (#89000411)	Broadway Ave. and U.S. Route 12; 41°40′24″N 86°59′09″W	Beverly Shores	Beverly Shores Station is the last example of the "Insull Spanish" architecture style used for station houses along the electric railroad lines acquired by Samuel Insull in the first part of the twentieth century. Within Indiana Dunes National Park.
4	Beverly Shores-Century of Progress Architectural District	Beverly Shores-Century of Progress Architectural District	June 30, 1986 (#86001472)	208, 210, 212, 214, and 215 Lake Front Dr. 41°41′03″N 87°00′06″W	Beverly Shores	The Century of Progress Architectural District consists of five buildings, all from the Homes of Tomorrow Exhibition during the 1933 Century of Progress World's Fair which took place in Chicago. Within Indiana Dunes National Park.
5	Conrad and Catherine Bloch House	Conrad and Catherine Bloch House	June 23, 2011 (#11000386)	608 Academy St. 41°28′25″N 87°03′52″W	Valparaiso	
6	George Brown Mansion	George Brown Mansion	August 28, 1998 (#98001101)	700 W. Porter Ave. 41°36′25″N 87°03′41″W	Chesterton	
7	Chesterton Commercial Historic District	Chesterton Commercial Historic District	September 9, 1999 (#99001102)	109–193 N. Calumet Rd. and 130–134 N. Calumet Rd. 41°36′39″N 87°03′08″W	Chesterton	The town's location along the railroad helped industry to grow. Soon, there was a cooperage, sawmills, a washing machine factory, and an organ company. Among the better examples of the towns growth are the commercial building on the southwest corner of Broadway and Calumet Rd, and the old Chesterton Tribune Building.
8	Chesterton Residential Historic District	Chesterton Residential Historic District	December 24, 2009 (#09001134)	Roughly a two-block area between Lincoln and W. Indiana Aves. 41°36′32″N 87°03′13″W	Chesterton	
9	Chicago Mica Co.- Continental Diamond Fibre Co.-ANCO Factory		December 26, 2023 (#100009652)	350 South Campbell Street; 41°27′52″N 87°03′58″W	Valparaiso	
10	Patrick and Catherine Clifford House		November 16, 2021 (#100007173)	106 Washington St. 41°28′10″N 87°03′40″W	Valparaiso	
11	Norris and Harriet Coambs Lustron House	Norris and Harriet Coambs Lustron House	September 17, 1992 (#92001165)	411 Bowser Ave. 41°36′29″N 87°02′44″W	Chesterton	
12	Collier Lodge Site	Collier Lodge Site	December 24, 2009 (#09001133)	1099 Baum's Bridge Rd., southwest of Kouts; 41°16′32″N 87°04′18″W	Pleasant Township	
13	Cowles Bog	Cowles Bog	April 29, 2025 (#100011750)	1100 N. Mineral Springs Road (Indiana Dunes National Park); 41°38′15″N 87°05′32″W	Chesterton vicinity	
14	Dune Acres Clubhouse	Dune Acres Clubhouse	January 25, 2007 (#06001295)	Clubhouse Dr. 41°39′08″N 87°05′10″W	Dune Acres	
15	Clinton D. Gilson Barn	Clinton D. Gilson Barn	September 20, 1984 (#84001229)	522 W. 650S, northeast of Hebron; 41°20′22″N 87°09′59″W	Boone Township	
16	Good Fellow Club Youth Camp	Good Fellow Club Youth Camp	August 8, 2013 (#13000593)	700 Howe Rd. 41°37′36″N 87°06′02″W	Porter	Within Indiana Dunes National Park.
17	Haste-Crumpacker House	Haste-Crumpacker House	June 24, 2010 (#10000374)	208 N Michigan St. 41°28′14″N 87°03′31″W	Valparaiso	
18	Heritage Hall	Heritage Hall	July 12, 1976 (#76000016)	Campus Mall, S. College Ave. 41°27′43″N 87°03′15″W	Valparaiso	Heritage Hall is the oldest building on the campus of Valparaiso University. Erected in 1875, the building was named Flint Hall after the contractor. It was renamed after Richard Aaron Heritage, head of the music department from 1878–1894.
19	Imre and Maria Horner House	Imre and Maria Horner House	September 25, 1996 (#96001006)	2 Merrivale Ave. 41°41′32″N 86°58′46″W	Beverly Shores	
20	Hour Glass Cottage		August 31, 2023 (#100009294)	8 Lupine Ln. 41°37′26″N 87°11′35″W	Ogden Dunes	
21	Immanuel Lutheran Church	Immanuel Lutheran Church	February 19, 1982 (#82000028)	308 N. Washington St. 41°28′17″N 87°03′39″W	Valparaiso	The congregation was founded in 1862 by 45 German families. The church was erected in 1891 by Henry Lemster and his son Charles.
22	Dr. David J. Loring Residence and Clinic	Dr. David J. Loring Residence and Clinic	December 6, 1984 (#84000520)	102 Washington St. 41°28′09″N 87°03′38″W	Valparaiso	The Loring Residence and Clinic was the first facility built to provide medical services to the community. Dr Loring used his home as his medical office until his death in 1914.
23	William McCallum House	William McCallum House	January 25, 2007 (#06001293)	507 E. Lincolnway; 41°28′05″N 87°03′14″W	Valparaiso	
24	Charles S. and Mary McGill House	Charles S. and Mary McGill House	June 25, 2013 (#13000426)	505 N. Washington St. 41°28′22″N 87°03′41″W	Valparaiso	
25	Dr. John and Gerda Meyer House	Dr. John and Gerda Meyer House	November 28, 2012 (#12000974)	360 W. Fairwater Ave. 41°40′52″N 87°00′29″W	Beverly Shores	Within Indiana Dunes National Park.
26	New York Central Railroad Passenger Depot	New York Central Railroad Passenger Depot	August 28, 1998 (#98001103)	220 Broadway; 41°36′41″N 87°03′16″W	Chesterton	
27	Nike Missile Site C-32		September 11, 2025 (#100012210)	1100 N Mineral Springs Road & 1031–1035 North Wagner Road; 41°37′51″N 87°05′12″W	Porter	
28	Nike Missile Site C47	Nike Missile Site C47	January 21, 2000 (#99001669)	County Roads 600N and 700N, south of Portage; 41°31′24″N 87°10′40″W	Portage Township	One of 300 Nike missile bases, and one of a dozen located around Chicago. The sites were decommissioned and sold. This is one of the more complete sites. The administrative area is used as a paintball site, while the launch site remains in government ownership.
29	Porter County Jail and Sheriff's House	Porter County Jail and Sheriff's House	June 23, 1976 (#76000017)	153 Franklin St. 41°27′59″N 87°03′34″W	Valparaiso	The sheriff’s residence was built in 1860. The structure is Italianate in design. It is located on East Indiana Ave, which was Mechanic Street when the house was built. The Jail was added in 1871.
30	Porter County Memorial Hall	Porter County Memorial Hall	May 23, 1984 (#84001231)	104 Indiana Ave. 41°28′00″N 87°03′33″W	Valparaiso	Originally, the Chaplain Brown GAR Post No. 106. Designed in 1892 by local architect, Charles F. Lembke, using Romanesque styling, it was built in 1892-3 to seat 100 people. It was also used as the local opera house.
31	Porter Town Hall	Porter Town Hall	June 29, 2000 (#00000678)	303 Franklin St. 41°36′59″N 87°04′20″W	Porter	Replaced by a modern structure in 2006.
32	Read Dunes House	Read Dunes House	December 8, 2011 (#10000858)	1453 Tremont Rd., north of Chesterton; 41°38′40″N 87°02′52″W	Westchester Township	Within Indiana Dunes National Park.
33	David Garland Rose House	David Garland Rose House	July 17, 1980 (#80000030)	156 Garfield St. 41°27′59″N 87°03′06″W	Valparaiso	The David Garland Rose House was built circa 1860 in Valparaiso, Indiana, USA. This Gothic Revival house is unusual in that it is eight-sided, an octagon.
34	Eli Sigler House	Eli Sigler House	March 21, 2011 (#11000124)	104 W. Church St. 41°19′03″N 87°12′01″W	Hebron	
35	DeForest Skinner House	DeForest Skinner House	June 24, 2008 (#08000568)	208 Washington St. 41°28′14″N 87°03′39″W	Valparaiso	
36	Solomon Enclave	Solomon Enclave	April 27, 2011 (#11000220)	901, 903, 907 E. Lake Front Dr. 41°41′58″N 86°57′44″W	Beverly Shores	Within Indiana Dunes National Park.
37	Valparaiso Downtown Commercial District	Valparaiso Downtown Commercial District	February 23, 1990 (#90000327)	Roughly bounded by Jefferson, Morgan, Indiana, and Napoleon; also the northwestern corner of the junction of Lincolnway and Napoleon St. 41°28′02″N 87°03′37″W	Valparaiso	Second set of addresses represents a boundary increase of December 27, 2010
38	Valparaiso University Chapel of the Resurrection	Valparaiso University Chapel of the Resurrection	November 16, 2021 (#100007172)	1600 Chapel Dr. 41°27′48″N 87°02′32″W	Valparaiso	
39	Weller House	Weller House	April 22, 1982 (#82000029)	1200 North Rd., east of Chesterton; 41°36′26″N 86°57′04″W	Pine Township	
40	West Beach Historic District	West Beach Historic District	April 29, 2025 (#100011751)	376 North County Line Road (Indiana Dunes National Park); 41°37′17″N 87°12′39″W	Portage Township	
41	Edward Astoria and Margaret Wilson House		September 2, 2025 (#100012175)	1001 W. US 20; 41°37′17″N 87°05′16″W	Porter	
42	Josephus Wolf House	Josephus Wolf House	December 19, 2007 (#07001281)	453 W. 700N, northwest of Valparaiso; 41°32′11″N 87°09′14″W	Portage Township	
43	Martin Young House	Martin Young House	March 29, 2007 (#07000208)	324 2nd St. 41°36′29″N 87°03′15″W	Chesterton	

== See also ==
- List of National Historic Landmarks in Indiana
- National Register of Historic Places listings in Indiana
- Listings in neighboring counties: Berrien (MI), Jasper, Lake, LaPorte, Starke
- List of Indiana state historical markers in Porter County
