= Conrad and Catherine Bloch House =

Historic house in Indiana, United States

- U.S. National Register of Historic Places
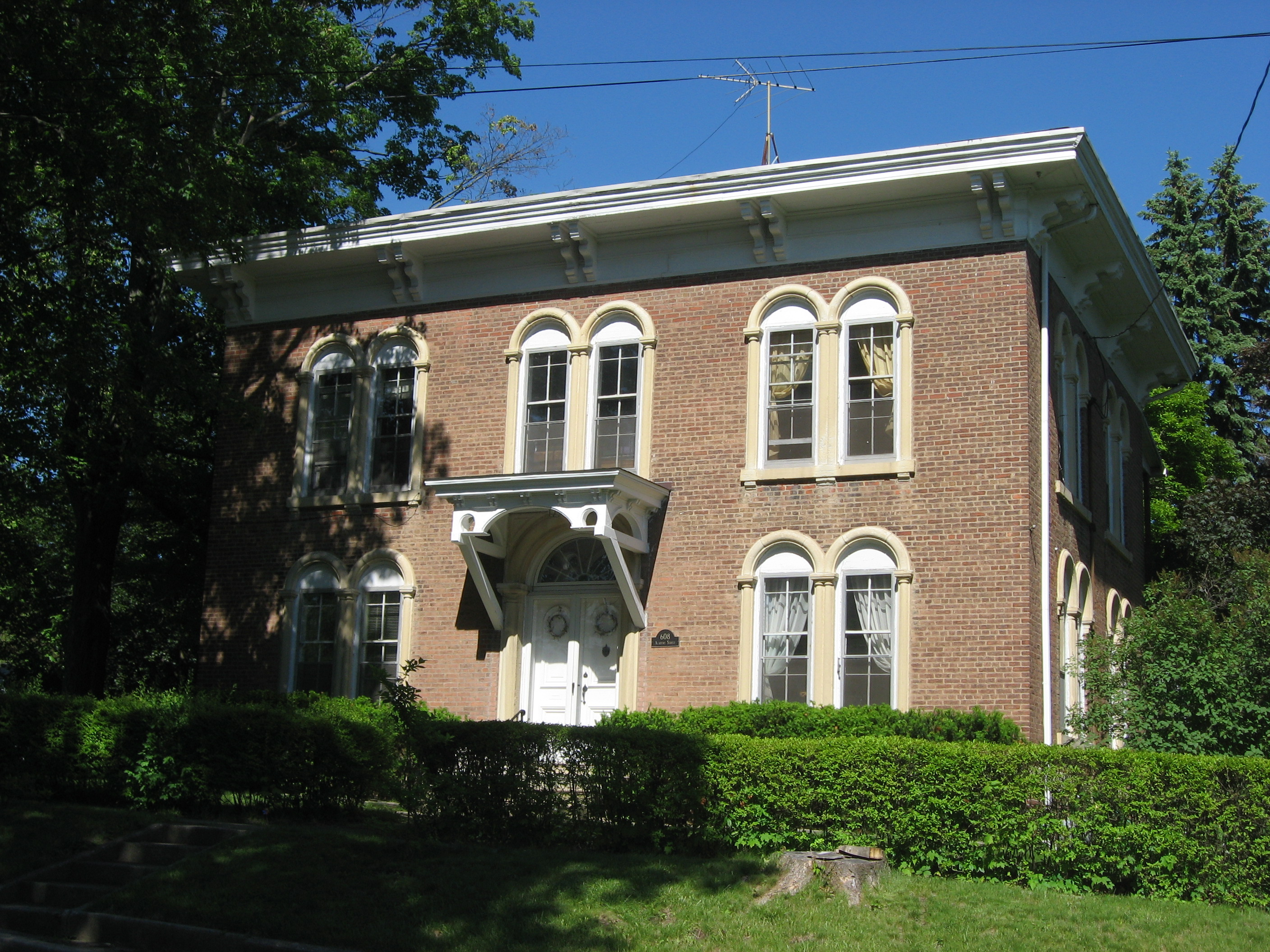
- Front of the Conrad and Catherine Bloch House, located at 608 N. Academy Street in Valparaiso, Indiana, United States.

- Location within Indiana Location within the United States
- Location: Valparaiso, Indiana
- Coordinates: 41°28′5″N 87°3′15″W
- Area: less than one acre
- Built: 1885
- Architect: Lemster, Henry
- Architectural style: Italianate
- NRHP reference No.: 11000386
- Added to NRHP: June 23, 2011

The Italianate House at 608 Academy Street, Valparaiso, Indiana was constructed by Conrad and Catherine Bloch in about 1873. The double-pile brick house has a commanding presence on a double lot at the corner of Park and Academy Streets. A brick woodhouse dates to about the same period as the house. The garage dates from about 1940. The house was converted to the Valparaiso Hospital and Sanitarium by Dr. Harvey Cook in about 1923. It has been converted back to a single family home.

Conrad and Catherine Bloch came to Valparaiso and opened a store. They built their brick home in the Italianate style. About 1923, Luther Bloch Jr., a grandson leased the building to Dr. Harvey Cook. Dr. Cook opened it as a hospital. The doctor lived east of the hospital at Morgan and Chicago Streets. Structural changes were made to accommodate the hospital. When it closed I the early 1930s, it was turned into apartments. It continued in use as apartments until 1975. In 1977, it was converted back to single-family use. A student apartment remains on the upper floor.

== Exterior ==
The house faces Academy Street to the west. The foundation is brick with a blend of colors using salmon, red, orange and tans. Stone trim forms a water table about 3 feet (0.91 m) above ground between the basement and the first floor. The main entry and front windows are trimmed in arched stone half-rounds and sills. The window arches rest on thin engaged stone columns. Some windows have paired engaged columns between. The other facades have less ornate trim. Paired scrolled wood brackets support a wide overhanging eave. The house is covered by a low-sloped hipped roof.

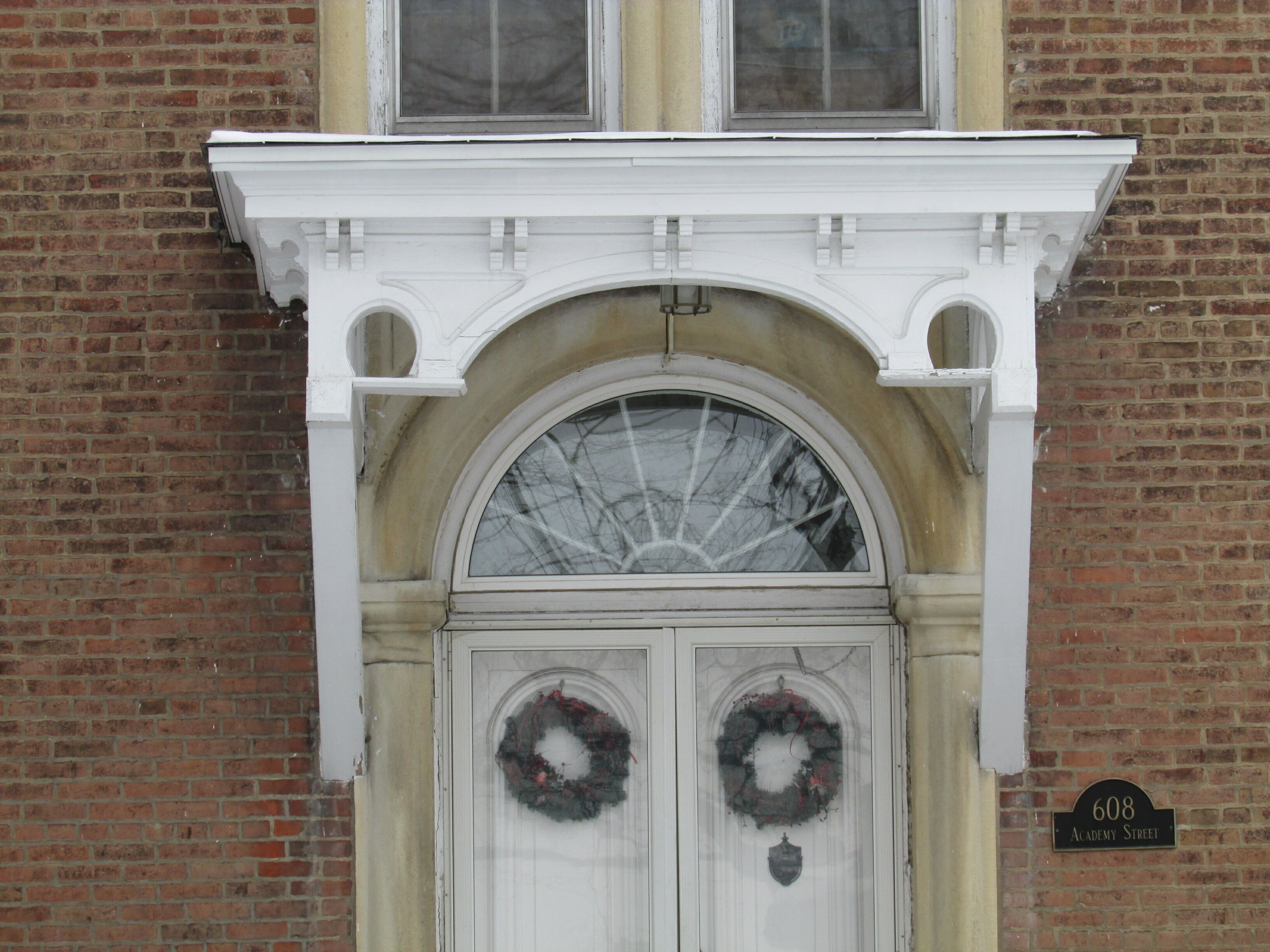
Main entry trimmed in arched stone half-rounds.

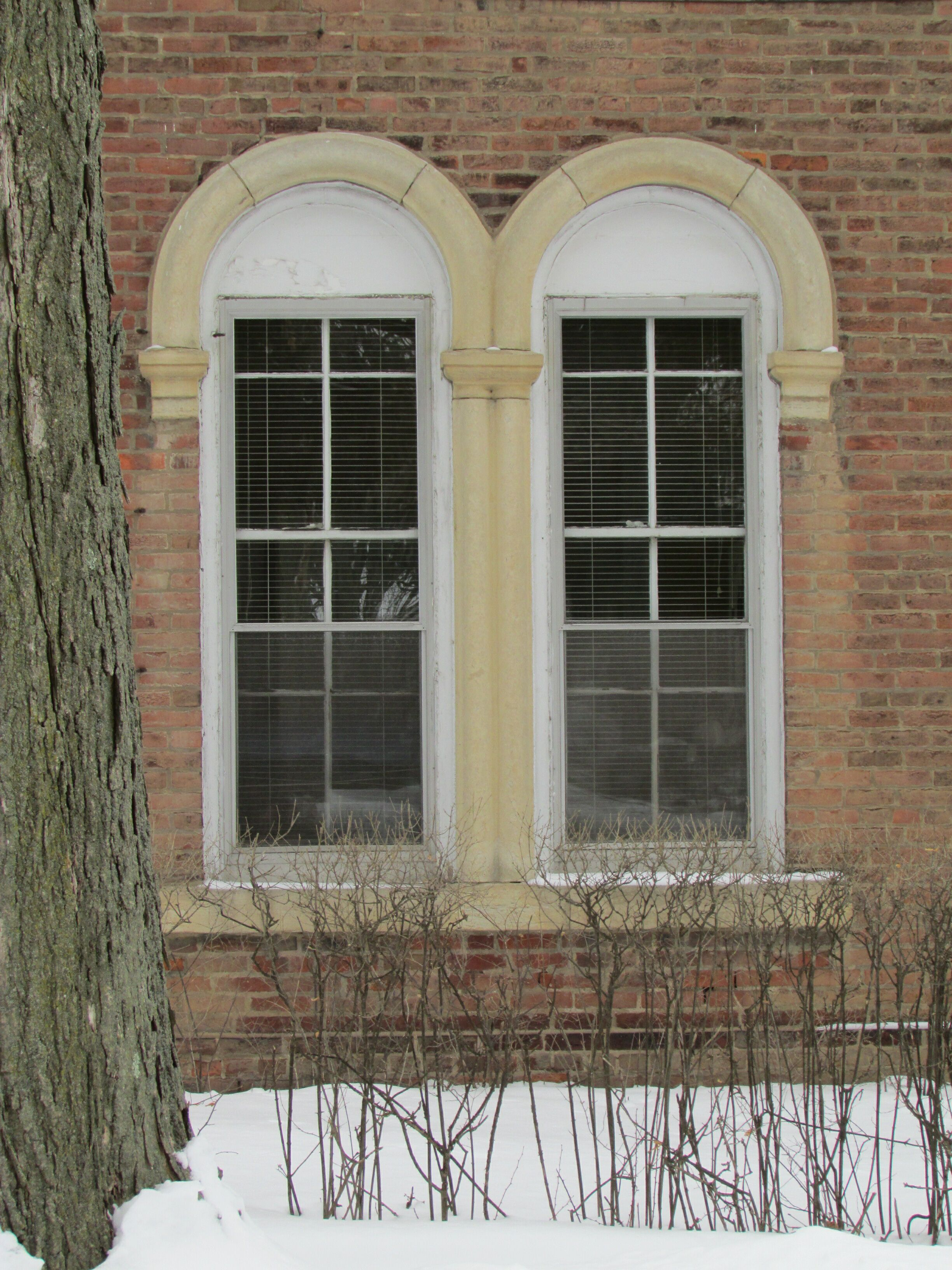
Front windows are trimmed in arched stone half-rounds and sills.

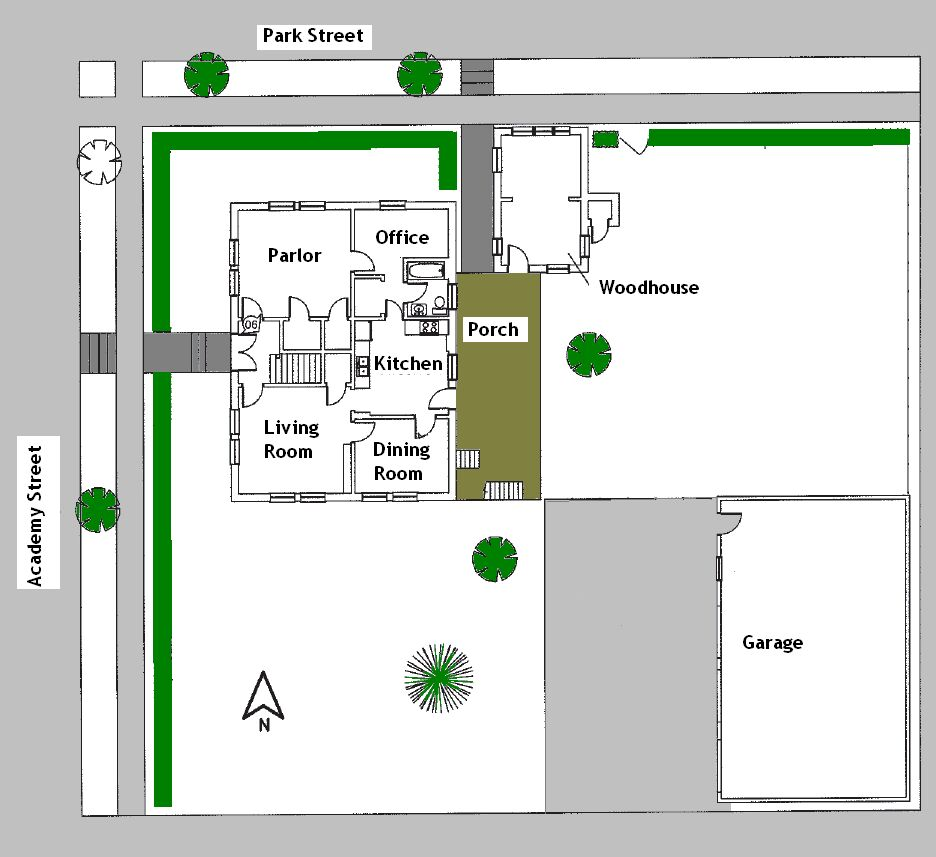
Site plan of the William Bloch House

=== Buildings and districts on the NRHP ===
- Haste-Crumpacker House
- Heritage Hall
- Immanuel Lutheran Church
- Dr. David J. Loring Residence and Clinic
- William McCallum House
- Charles S. and Mary McGill House
- Porter County Jail and Sheriff's House
- Porter County Memorial Opera Hall
- David Garland Rose House
- DeForest Skinner House
- Valparaiso Downtown Commercial District
- Washington Street Historic District (Valparaiso, Indiana)
