= William McCallum House =

Historic house in Indiana, United States

- U.S. National Register of Historic Places
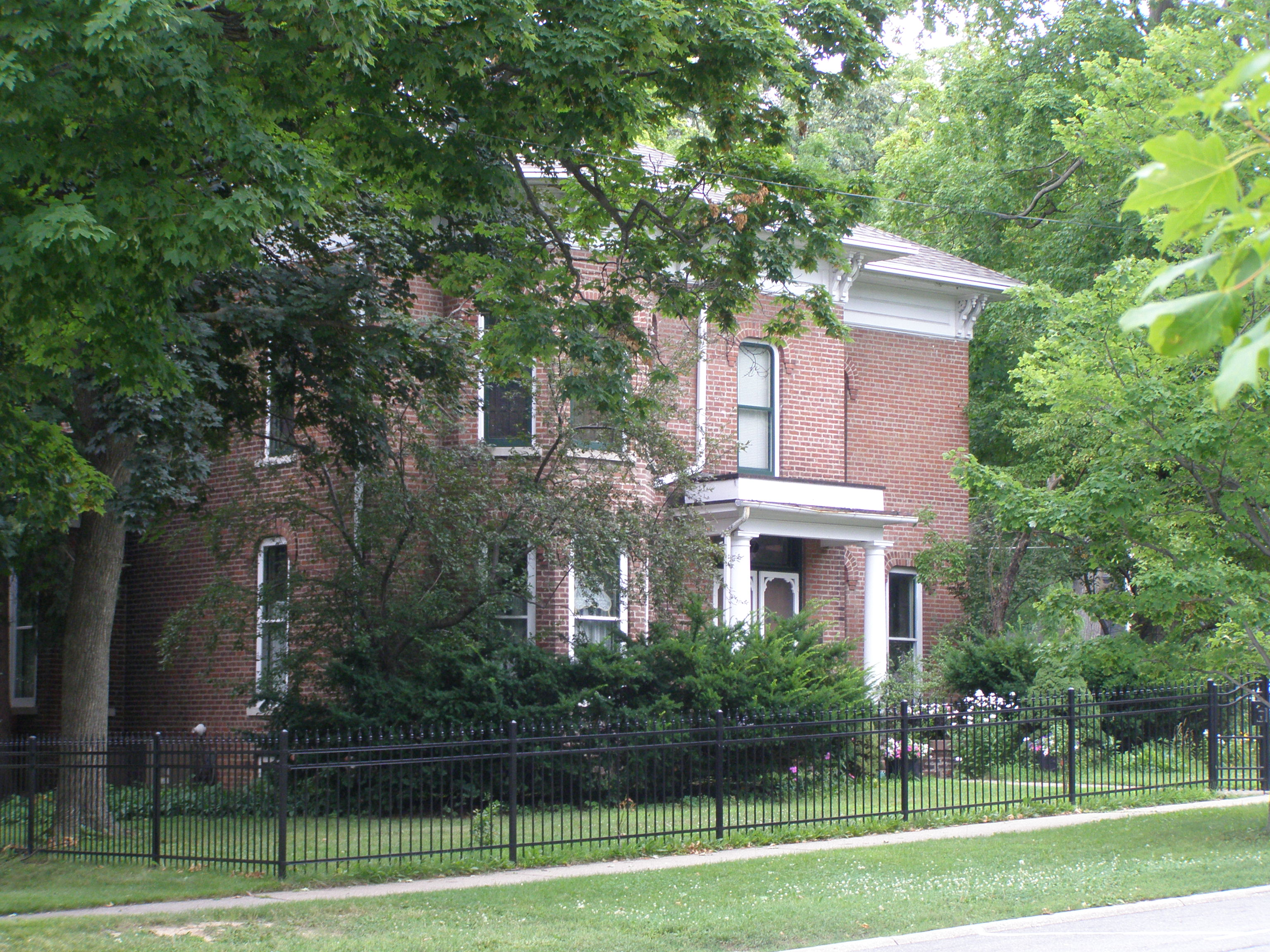

- Location within Indiana Location within the United States
- Location: 507 E. Lincolnway, Valparaiso, Indiana
- Coordinates: 41°28′5″N 87°3′15″W
- Area: less than one acre
- Built: 1885
- Architectural style: Italianate
- NRHP reference No.: 06001293
- Added to NRHP: January 25, 2007

The William B. McCallum House, built in 1887, is an Italianate Style house in Valparaiso, Indiana contains many of the basic elements of Italianate design, including brick masonry, deep eves, thick cornice features of wood and protruding flattened arch brick window lintels and a two-story bay window.

William McCallum, with his wife Susan and their two children came to United States from Canada in 1878. He is listed as a “dry goods merchant” in 1884 with a store at 13 East Main, a few blocks west of his home. In 1899–1900, the firm of Specht-Finney-Skinner opened a department store at 11 East Main. McCallum appeared to have joined that firm as he was no longer listed as self-employed. At age 84, according to the 1930 Census, McCallum was still working as a dry goods salesman. In that year, the house was valued at $12,000.

== History ==
In 1884, William McCallum and his wife Susan purchased the property on the northwest corner of Main and College Avenue, which was part of the Woodhull Addition. The following year, construction began on his house, designed and built by Henry Lemster. It cost about $10,500. Between 1893 and 1902, the city revised its street number system, such that the home was variously numbered: ‘’81 East Main’’. ‘’99 East Main’’ and ‘’507 East Main.’’ When the Lincoln Highway was dedicated in 1928 by the Boy Scouts, the city decided to rename Main Street as Lincolnway. Today, the McCallum’s address is “507 Lincolnway.”

The McCallums took in boarders for several years between the 1920 census and the 1930. Glen and Clara Dean purchased the house after 1930, but before 1938. Dean was the son of the founder of Valparaiso Plumbing Company, Lyman Dean. They were located at 210 East Lincolnway in the mid-twentieth century. The Lyman Deans lived at 502 College Avenue, a few block south. Dean's plumbing and heating firm installed the indoor plumbing.

Between 1938 and the 1950s, numerous renovations were made. The first was to create an apartment on the second floor, then a second apartment on that floor. Finally, a third apartment was created on the first floor. The Deans claimed also to have taken out all the poplar flooring in the house and replaced it with oak. During these years, they found the original interior shutters. After repairs and staining, they were reinstalled.

In 1947, the house to William and Ray Von Doehren. In the 1950s, Mrs. Von Doehren added a family room with a fireplace and a garage on the southside of the house, along with a white clapboard “bump-out” on the west side of the kitchen. The house remained divided into three apartments.

Upon the death of Mrs. Von Doehren the house was given to Harriet Troxel. She and her husband, Bob Troxel, moved in around 1980. She willed the house to her daughter, Sharon Swihart. She and her husband moved to the house in 2001. As the tenants have moved out, the Swiharts began to convert it back to a single-family residence.

== Architecture ==
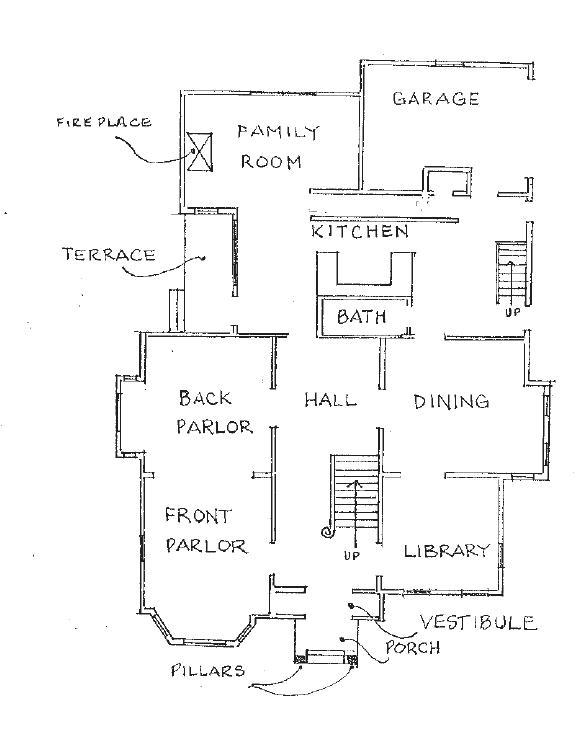
Floor Plan of the Wm McCallum Hse in Valparaiso, IN

The house was constructed circa 1885 as a two-story, double brick, asymmetrical Italianate residence with a low hip-and-gable roof system. The exterior walls are English bond brick. The neighborhood contains similar houses on tree-covered lots. The interior is approximately 5,000 sq ft.

The front façade, on the south, include a Colonial Revival porch and a two-story bay. Two wooden Tuscan columns support porch roof. Above the front door is a rectangular glass transom of beveled and leaded white glass with the house number backed in red. West of the porch is the two-story bay with floor to ceiling windows. The crowns are finished with a two-brick drop or pendant with sandstone sills. The cornice is most apparent on the south facade, but is complete all around the house. Eave brackets are in pairs, and applied to a tall paneled trim band.

The house has been placed on the National Register of Historic Structures for the Italianate architecture.

== Character-Defining Features ==
- Asymmetrical hipped roof,
- gabled roof pitch on north section,
- protruding flattened brick arches above the windows,
- wooden double brackets along the deep molded cornice,
- brick bay window on the front façade,
- Centered Federal style wooden entry porch supported by two wood Tuscan columns,
- wooden boxed window on the west façade, painted white,
- double-hung wooden sash windows,
- double door vestibule,
- rectangular transom window above entry door.
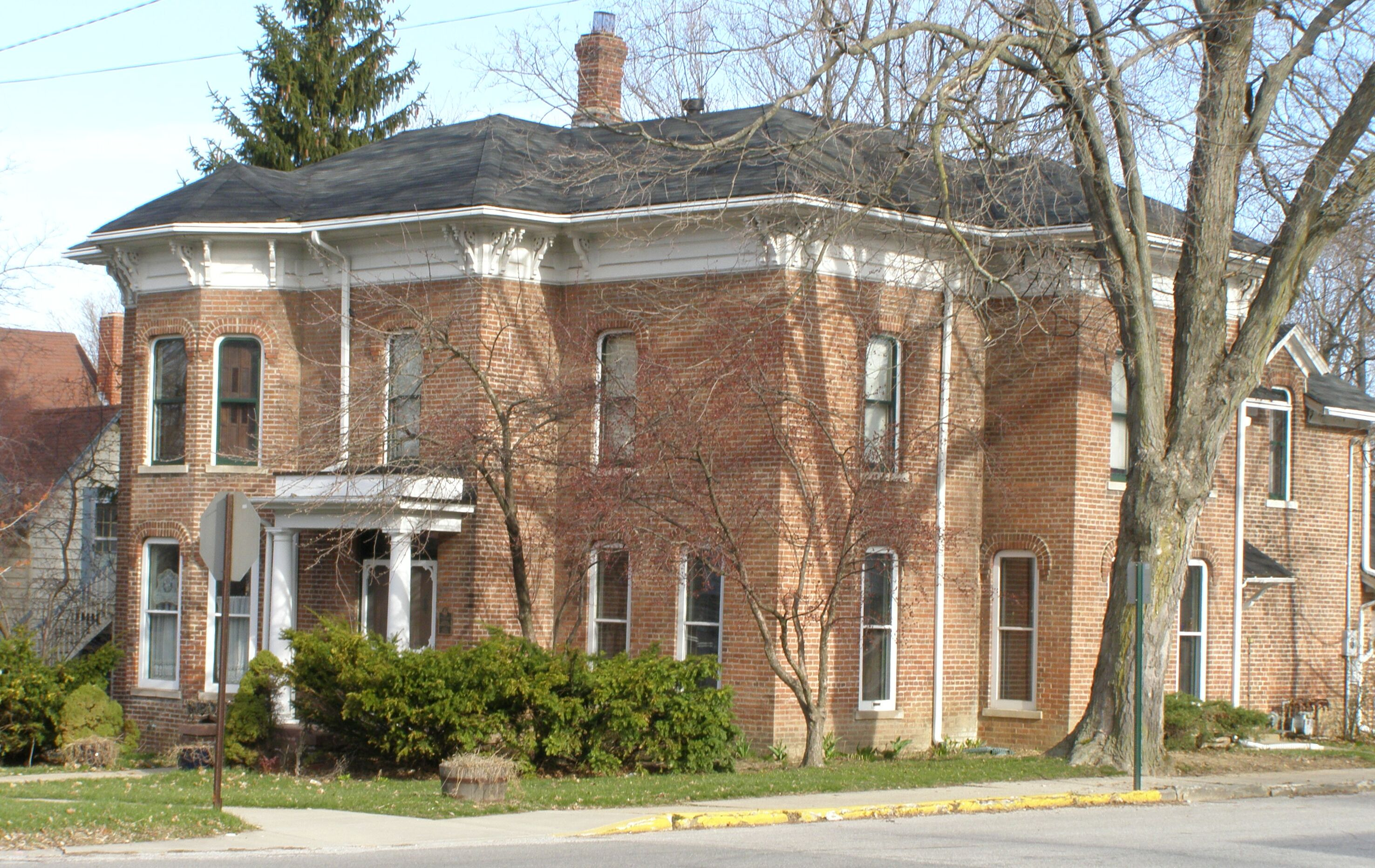
William McCallum House, Valparaiso, Indiana

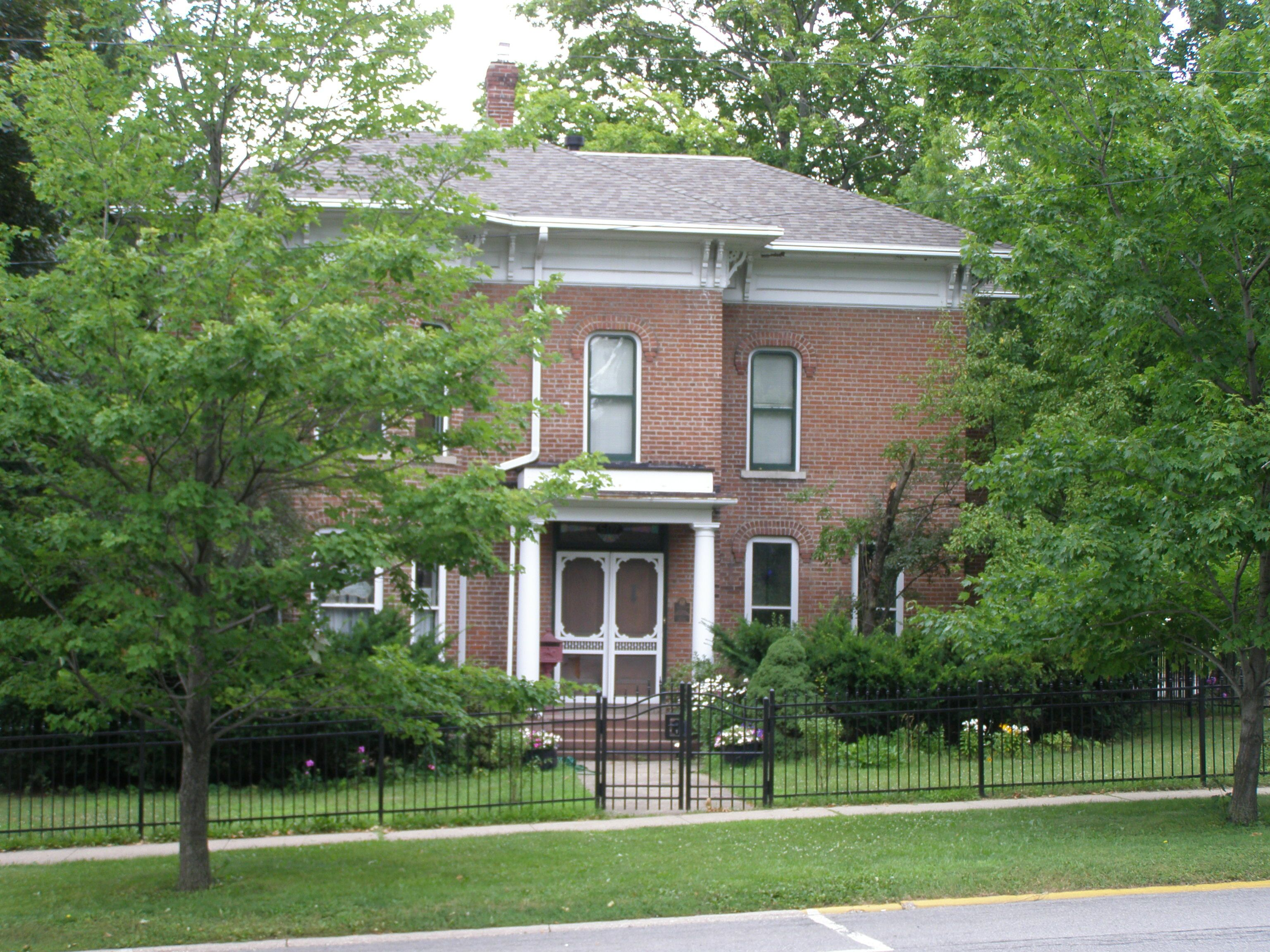
Lincolnway facade (south) of the William McCallum House, Valparaiso, Indiana

=== Buildings and districts on the NRHP ===
- Conrad and Catherine Bloch House
- Haste-Crumpacker House
- Heritage Hall
- Immanuel Lutheran Church
- Dr. David J. Loring Residence and Clinic
- Charles S. and Mary McGill House
- Porter County Jail and Sheriff's House
- Porter County Memorial Opera Hall
- David Garland Rose House
- DeForest Skinner House
- Valparaiso Downtown Commercial District
- Washington Street Historic District (Valparaiso, Indiana)
