= William McCallum =

William McCallum may refer to:

- William George MacCallum (1874–1944), Canadian-American physician and pathologist
- Willie McCallum (footballer) (born 1942), Scottish former footballer
- William G. McCallum (born 1956), a retired University Distinguished Professor of Mathematics at the University of Arizona
- William McCallum House, an Italianate Style house in Valparaiso, Indiana
- Bill McCallum (1911–unknown), Australian rules footballer

== See also ==
- Willie McCallum, Scottish Highland bagpipe player
