= Washington Street Historic District (Valparaiso, Indiana) =

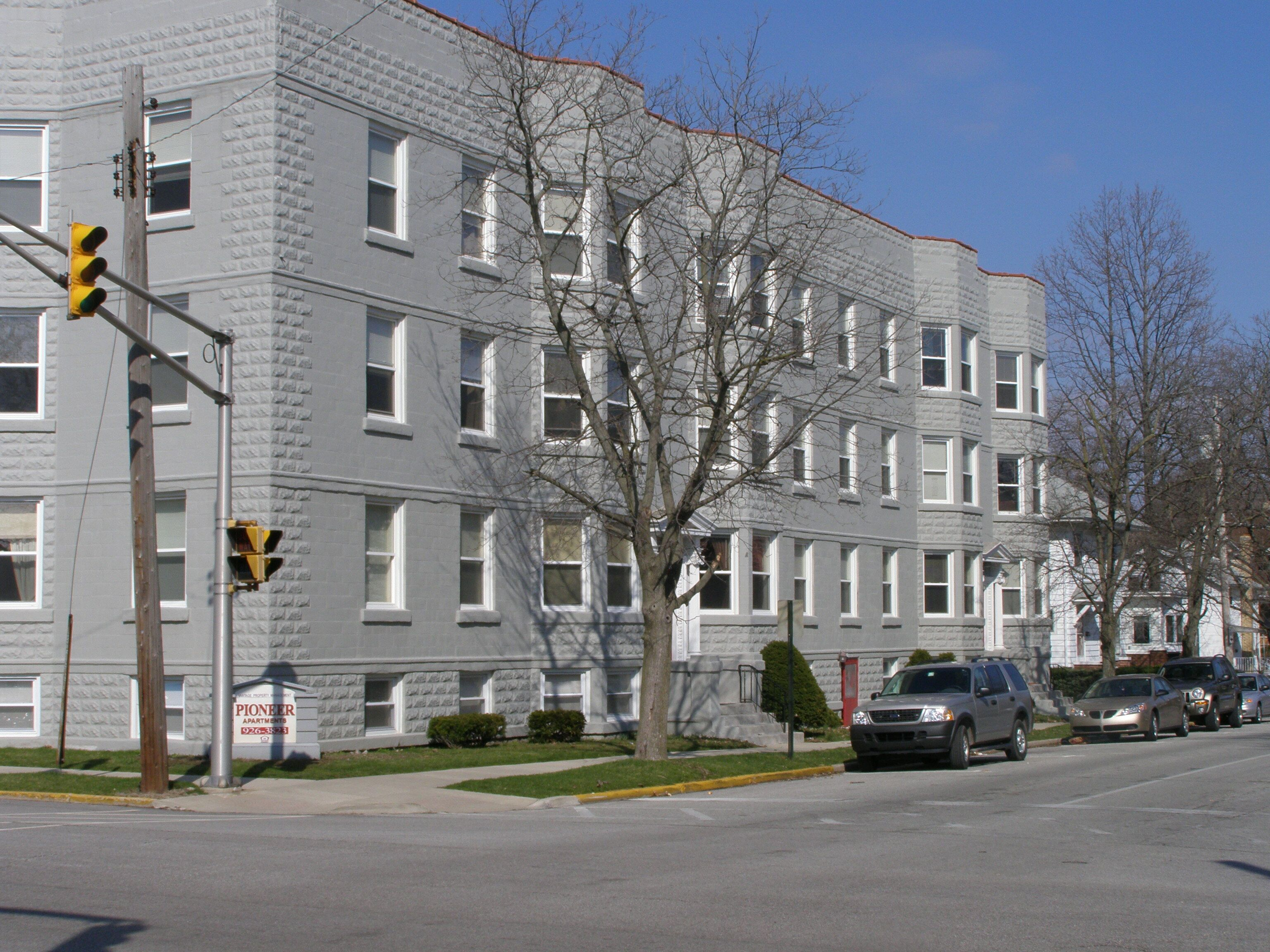
- Pioneer Apartments, North Franklin St.
- Location: Roughly bounded by Michigan, 8th, Napoleon, and Chicago streets, Valparaiso, Indiana

History
- Built: 1975–2000, 1950–1974, 1925–1949, 1900–1924, 1875–1899, 1850–1874, 1825–1849

Site notes
- Area: 630 acres (250 ha)
- Architect: Multiple
- Architectural styles: Federal, Queen Anne, Greek Revival

The Washington Street Historic District is north of Valparaiso's downtown. The neighborhood has tree-lined streets with many examples of late nineteenth- and early twentieth-century houses and public buildings. Valparaiso began to expand after the railroads came through the township in the 1860s; Pittsburgh, Fort Wayne and Chicago Railroad, the New York, Chicago and St. Louis Railroad and the Grand Trunk Railroad. Residential neighborhoods grew up between the business district and the railroads. On Valparaiso's south side industrial and transportation area expanded, thus residential development was north of downtown.

The district's earliest remaining houses date from the mid-nineteenth century. The Letherman House is the area's finest example of the Gothic Revival style. The Italianate style is also well represented in the district. The A. J. Buel House and the Colonel Mark DeMotte House are particularly noteworthy examples of the style. A collection of five houses (see North Franklin Street), were built in the Italianate style by local builder John D. Wilson. The early twentieth century brought a building boom to the area. Many of the district's most significant homes were built during this period. The Dr. David J. Loring House and Clinic was designed by local architect Charles Lembke in 1906 an example of the Free Classic style. The Colonial Revival style is represented by four houses on Washington Street (410, 507, 603, 703). The Tudor Revival style is represented by houses at 505 and 406 North Washington. In addition to the district's residential buildings, a number of noteworthy public buildings also remain. Immanuel Lutheran Church was listed on the National Register of Historic Places. This outstanding Gothic Revival style church was constructed in 1891. St. Andrew's Episcopal Church is now a condominium rebuilt in 2010 from its early twentieth-century roots. The Valparaiso High School is an elementary school. The Washington Street area remains as one of Valparaiso's most cohesive and architecturally significant neighborhoods.

== Significant buildings ==
All structures are historically contributing towards the Historic District Status, unless otherwise noted. An 'O’ rating signifies that the structure had enough historic or architectural significance to be considered for individual listing in the National Register of Historic Places. The 'N’ rating signifies that the structure is above average and may, with further investigation be eligible for an individual listing. The 'C’ or contributing rating signifies that the structure meet the basic inventory qualifications, but fails to meet individual merit, but in combination with other closely placed similar structures warrants inclusion in an historic district.

West Erie Street

- 152 House; Queen Anne, 1887 (N)

North Lafayette Street

- 203 House; Italianate/Queen Anne, c. 1880 (N)
- 205 House; Queen Anne, c. 1890 (N)
- 303 House; Gable-front/Italianate, c. 1875 (C)
- 305 House; Free Classic, c. 1980 (C)
- 309 House; Craftsman, c. 1925 (N)
- 401 House; Craftsman, c. 1929 (O)
- 405 House; Colonial Revival Cottage, c. 1930 (C)
- 407 House; Indeterminate, Indeterminate (NC)
- 501 House; T-plan, c. 1905 (C)
- 503 House; Gable-fronted/Greek Revival, c. 1860 (N)
- 502 House; Craftsman/Tudor Revival c. 1915 (O)
- 506 House; Queen Anne, c. 1890 (N)

North Washington Street

- 102 Dr. David J. Loring Residence and Clinic; Free Classic, (O) NR. In 1906 Dr. David f. Loring commissioned local architect Charles Lembke to design a building1 to serve as a house and medical clinic. Loring was a physician and surgeon and served as vice present of the Indiana State Medical Association and was the founder of the Porter County Medical Society. It was listed in the National Register of Historic Places in 1985.
- 106 House; Craftsman Bungalow, c. 1912 (N) The Craftsman bungalow was built by The Clifford Family, local builders of railroads and canals. The chains on the front porch differ in size and are rumored to have been used for canal dredging before their placement. The front porch mosaic floor is made up of approximately 90,000 tiles.
- 108 House; Craftsman Bungalow, c. 1912 (C) This Craftsman bungalow was built at the same time as 106 Washington, and by the same Clifford Family (likely for a son or daughter), and the construction quality is lesser throughout and the home is smaller.
- 202 Lorenzo Freeman House; Italianate, c. 1849 (O). A section of the house was built in 1849 for Lorenzo Freeman, a local businessman.
- 207 House; Italianate, c. 1875 (N)
- 208 Skinner House; Italianate, c. 1870 (N)
- 301 House; Colonial Revival, c. 1900 (N)
- 303 House; Colonial Revival, c. 1910 (O)
- 308 Immanuel Lutheran Church; Gothic Revival, 1891 (Henry and Charles Lemster, builder) (O) NR. The congregation formed in 1862 with 45 German families. A building, which served as both a school and church, was constructed several years later. As the congregation grew, this building was replaced in 1891 with present structure. The structure was listed in the National Register of Historic Places in 1982.
- 309 Letherman House; Gothic Revival, c. 1865 (O)
- 404 House; Craftsman, c. 1925 (N)
- 406 House; Tudor Revival, c. 1930 (O)
- 407 A.J. Buel House; Italianate, c. 1867 (O). This Italianate style house was built about 1867. Buel owned a wagon-making business in Valparaiso.
- 410 House; Colonial Revival, c. 1930 (O)
- 505 House; Tudor Revival, c. 1930 (O)
- 507 House; Colonial Revival, c. 1920 (N)
- 602 House; Gabled-ell, c. 1870 (C)
- 603 House; Colonial Revival, c. 1915 (N)
- 606 House; Queen Anne, 1882 (N)
- 703 House; Colonial Revival, c. 1930 (N)
- 704 House; Queen Anne, c. 1892 (N)
- 705 House; Gabled, c. 1885 (C)
- 706 House; T-plan/Queen Anne, c. 1890 (N)
- 708 House; Italianate, c. 1870 (N)

North Franklin Street

- 202- Pioneer Apartments; Twentieth Century Functional, 1908 (N)
- 203 House; American foursquare, c. 1910 (N)
- 208 St. Andrew's Episcopal Church, now St. Andrews Square Condominiums; Gothic Revival, 1902/1916 (C)
- 305 Valparaiso High School now Central Elementary School; Twentieth Century Functional, c. 1920 (C)
- 411 House; Italianate, c. 1880 (N)
- 501 Colonel Mark DeMotte House; Italianate, c. 1880 (O). The house was built about 1890 for the founder and dean of the Valparaiso Law School. DeMotte also served as the town's postmaster during the 1890s.
- 505 House; Queen Anne, c. 1890 (O)
- 512 House; Italianate, 1878 (John D. Wilson, builder) (N)
- 601 House; Italianate, c. 1885 (N)
- 602 House; Italianate, 1870 (John D. Wilson, builder) (N)
- 603 John D. Wilson House; Italianate/ Free Classic, 1891 (John D. Wilson, builder) (N)
- 604 House; Italianate/Craftsman, 1887/C.1913 (John D. Wilson, builder) (N)
- 605 House; Italianate, 1885 (John D. Wilson, builder) (N)

== Gallery ==
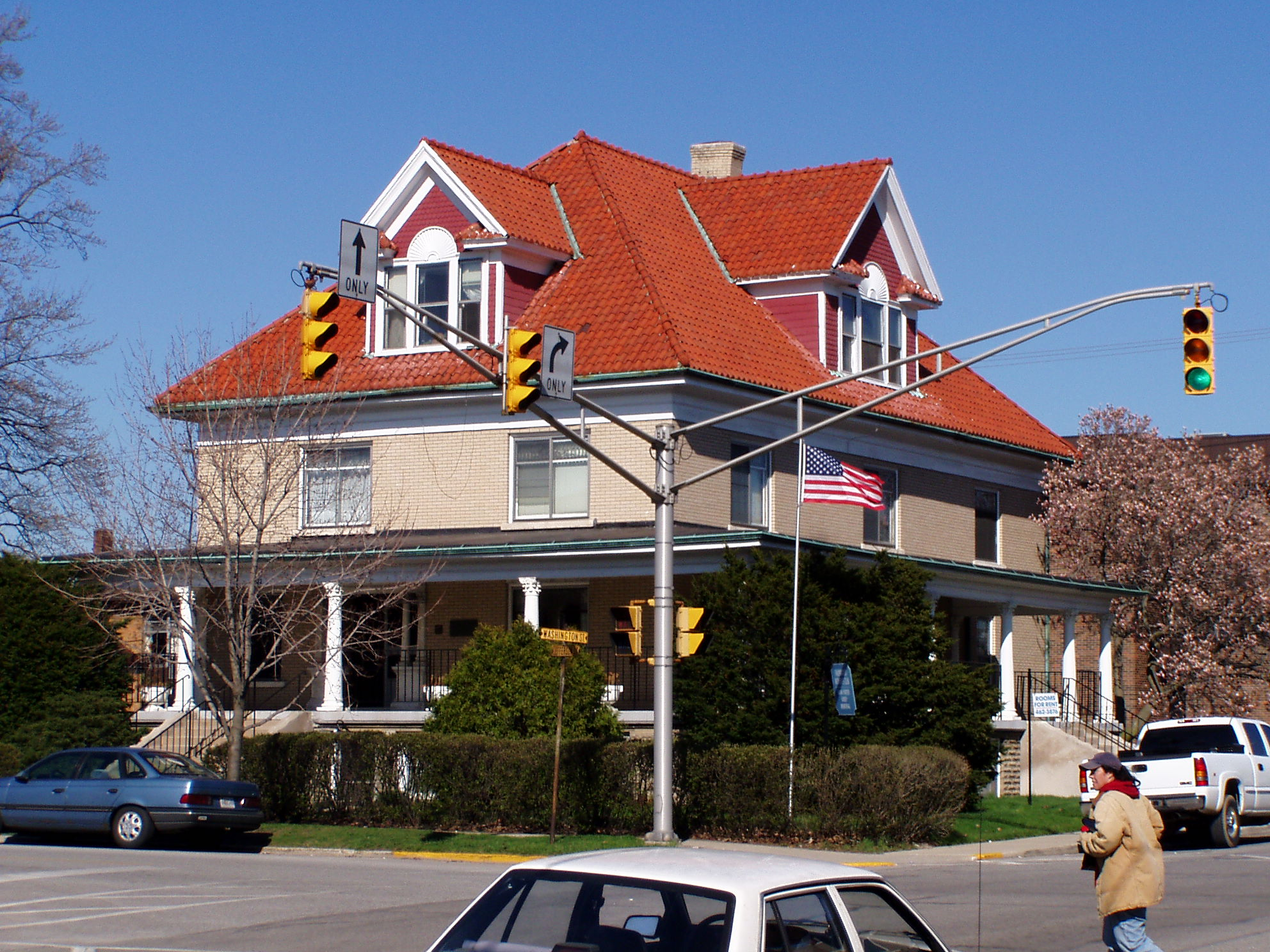
Dr. David J. Loring House and Clinic {see article}

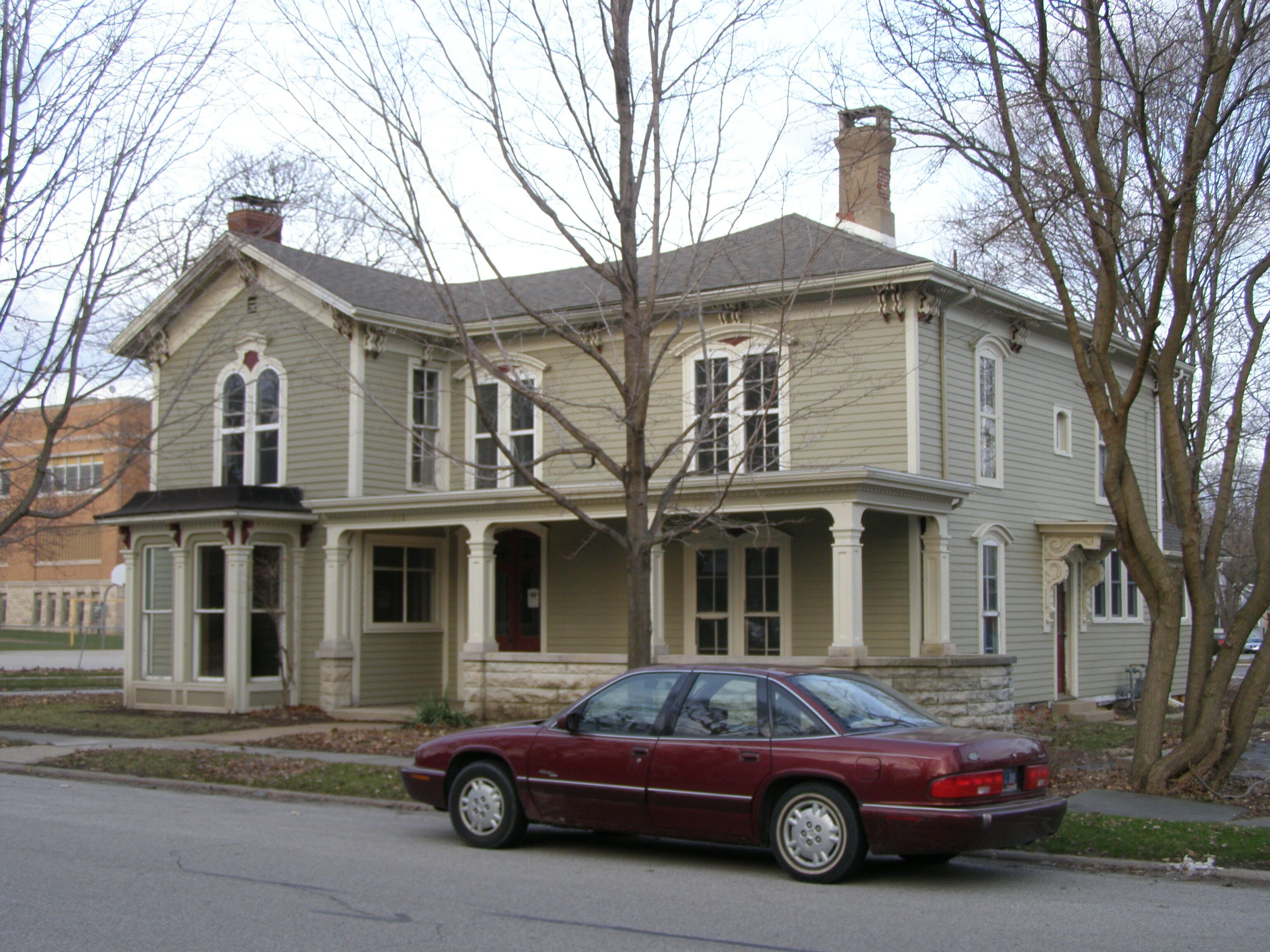
DeForest Skinner House

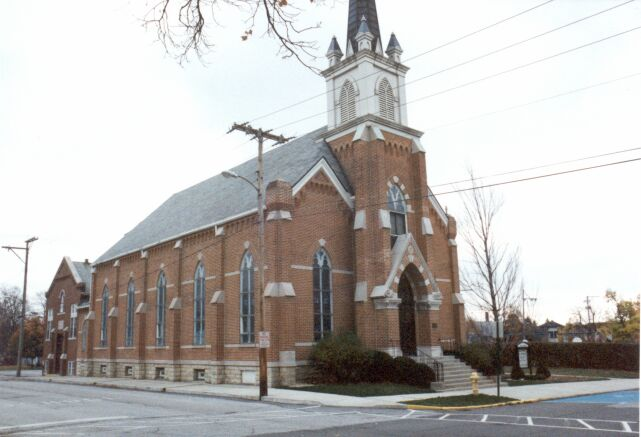
Immanuel Lutheran Church {see article}

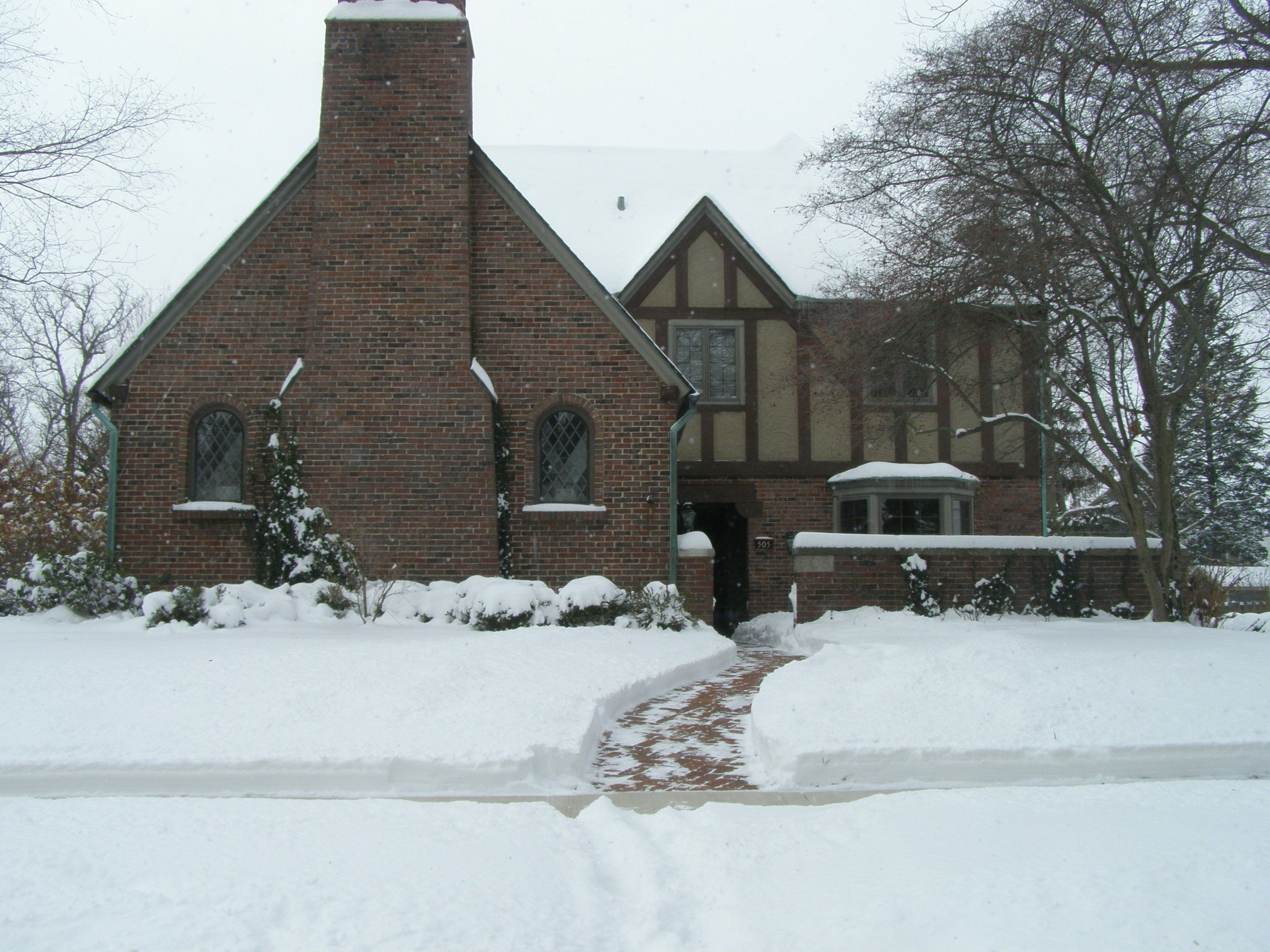
505 N Washington, McGill House

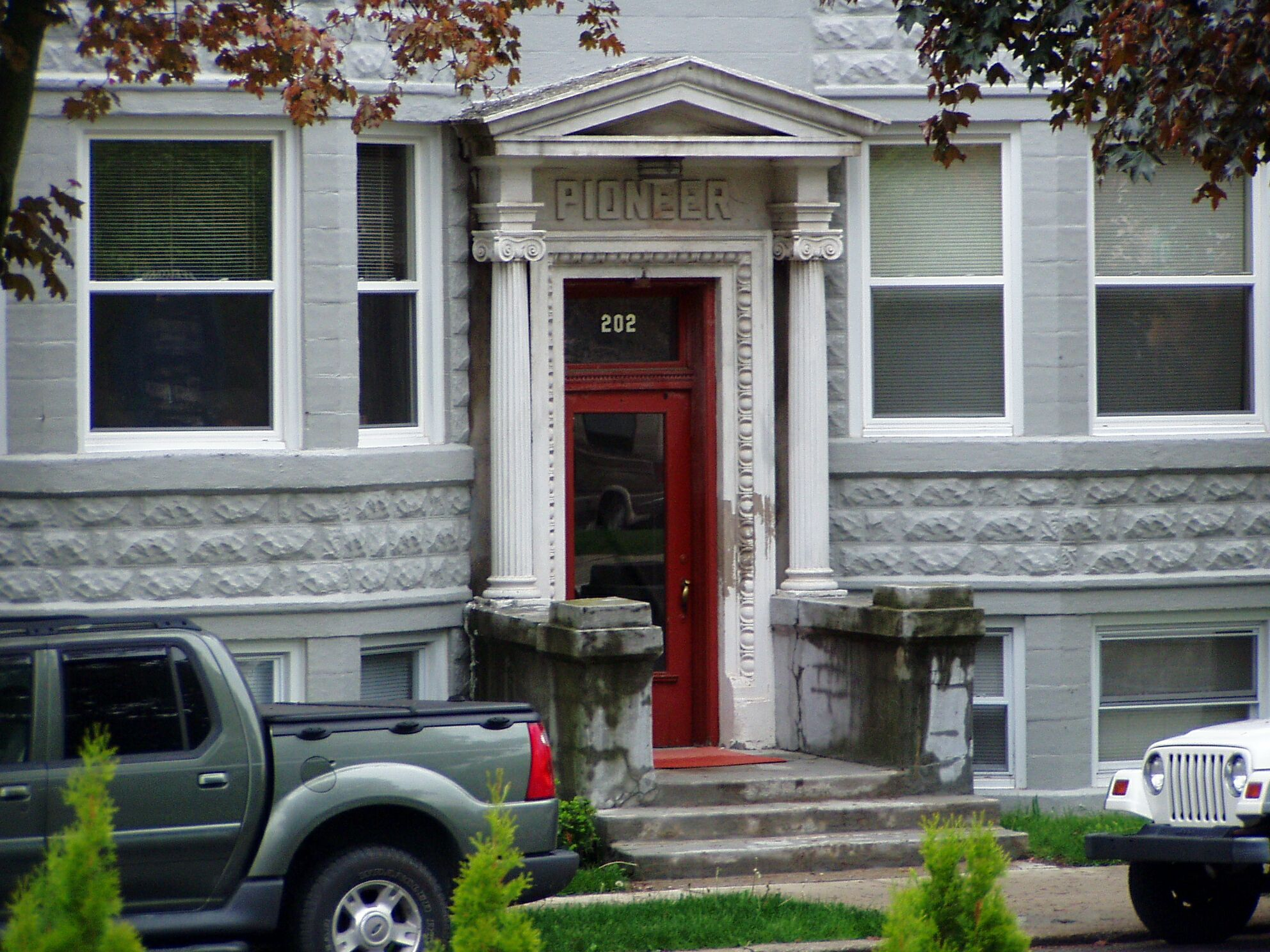
Pioneer Apartments

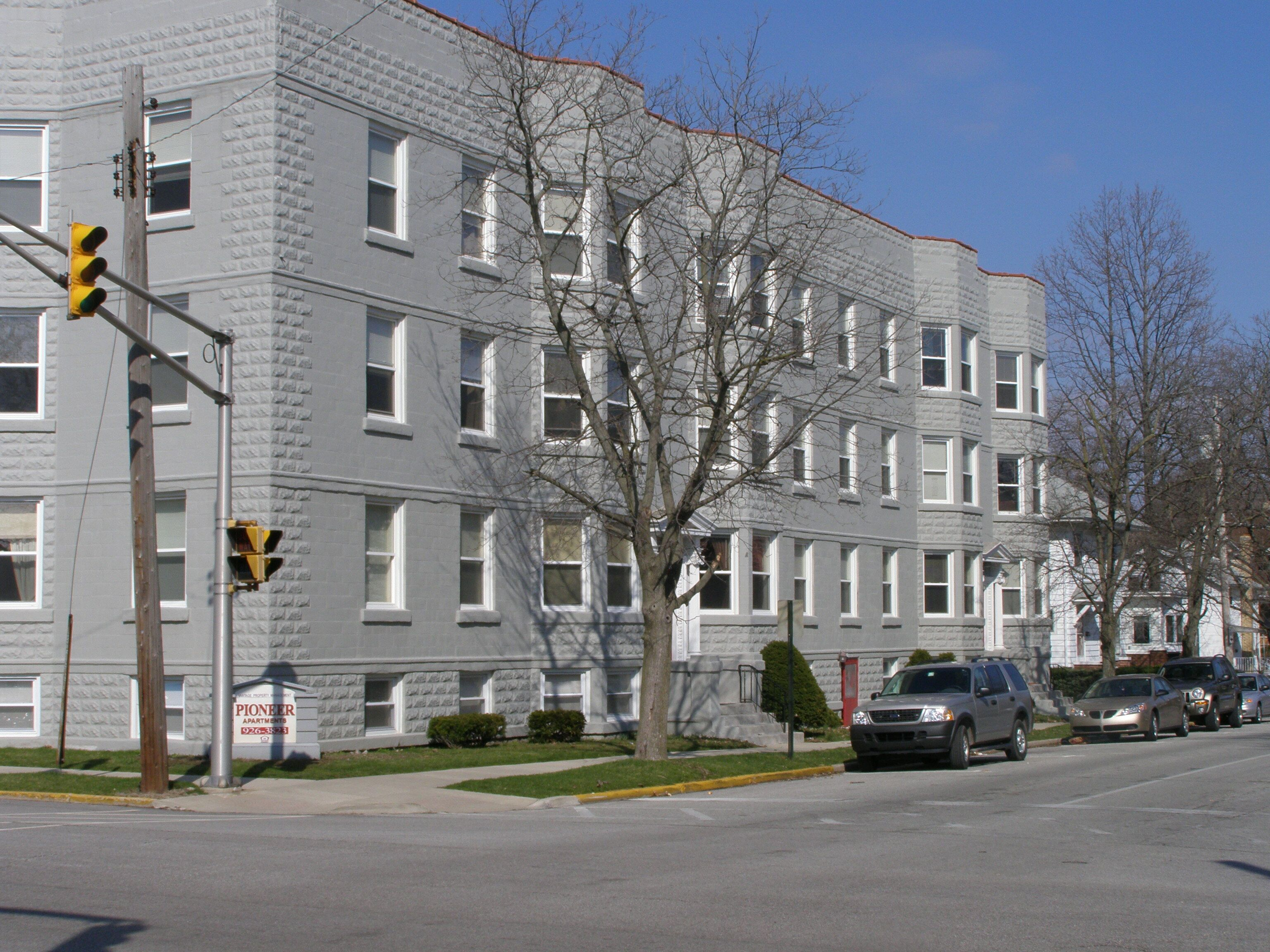
Pioneer Apartments

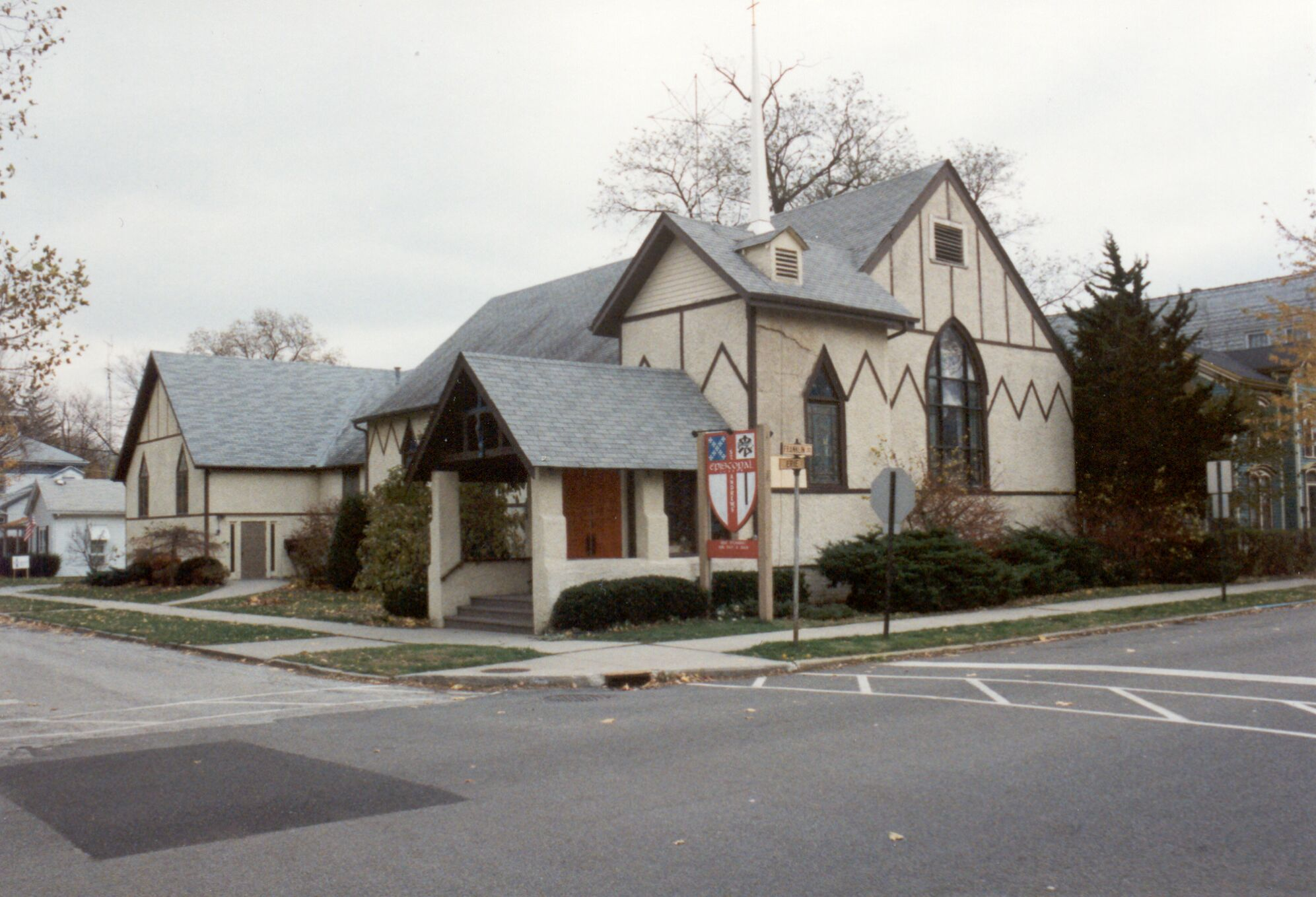
St. Anthony's Episcopal Church

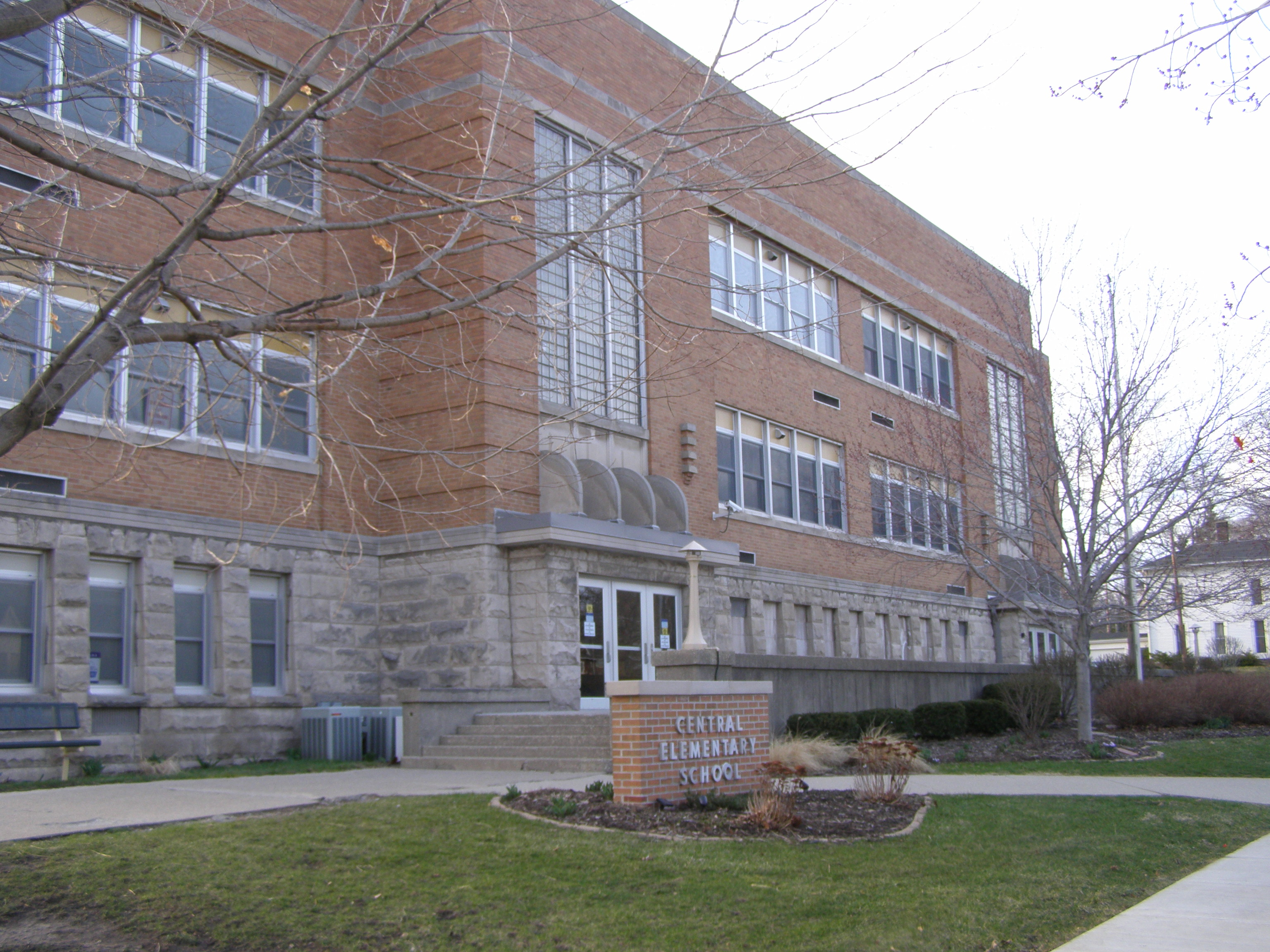
305 Franklin (Old Valparaiso High School)

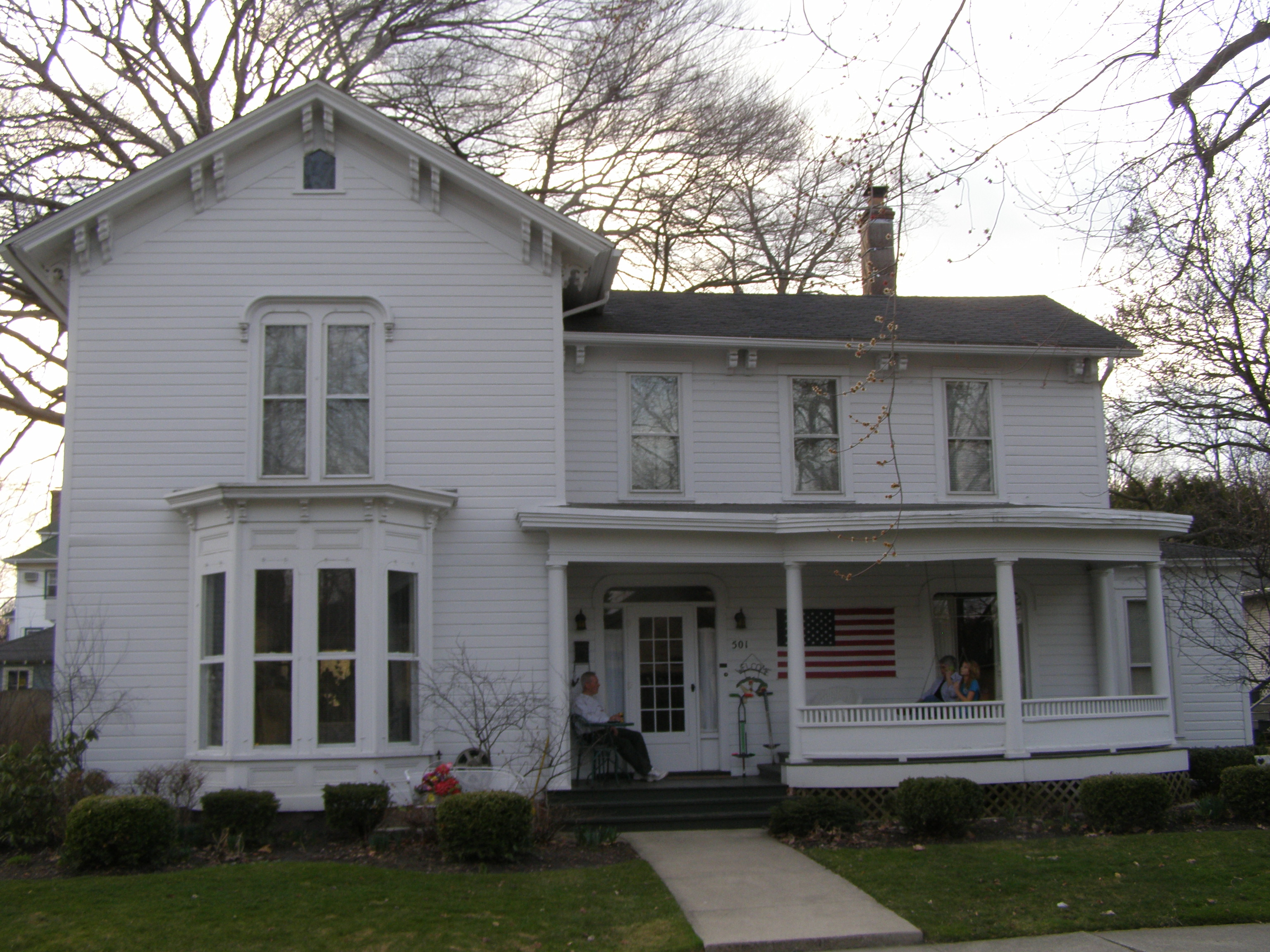
501 Franklin, Col. DeMotte House

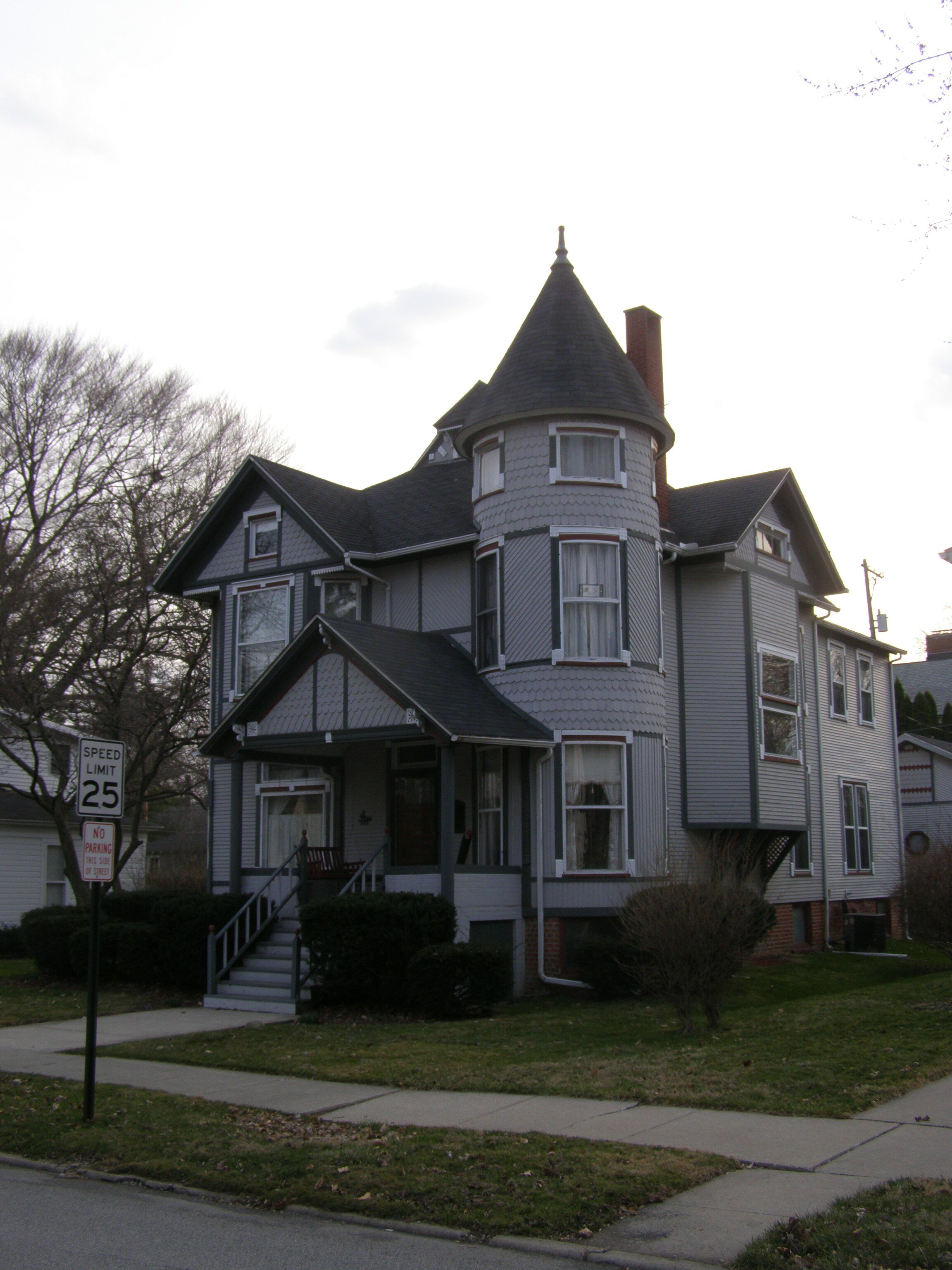
505 Franklin a John Wilson house

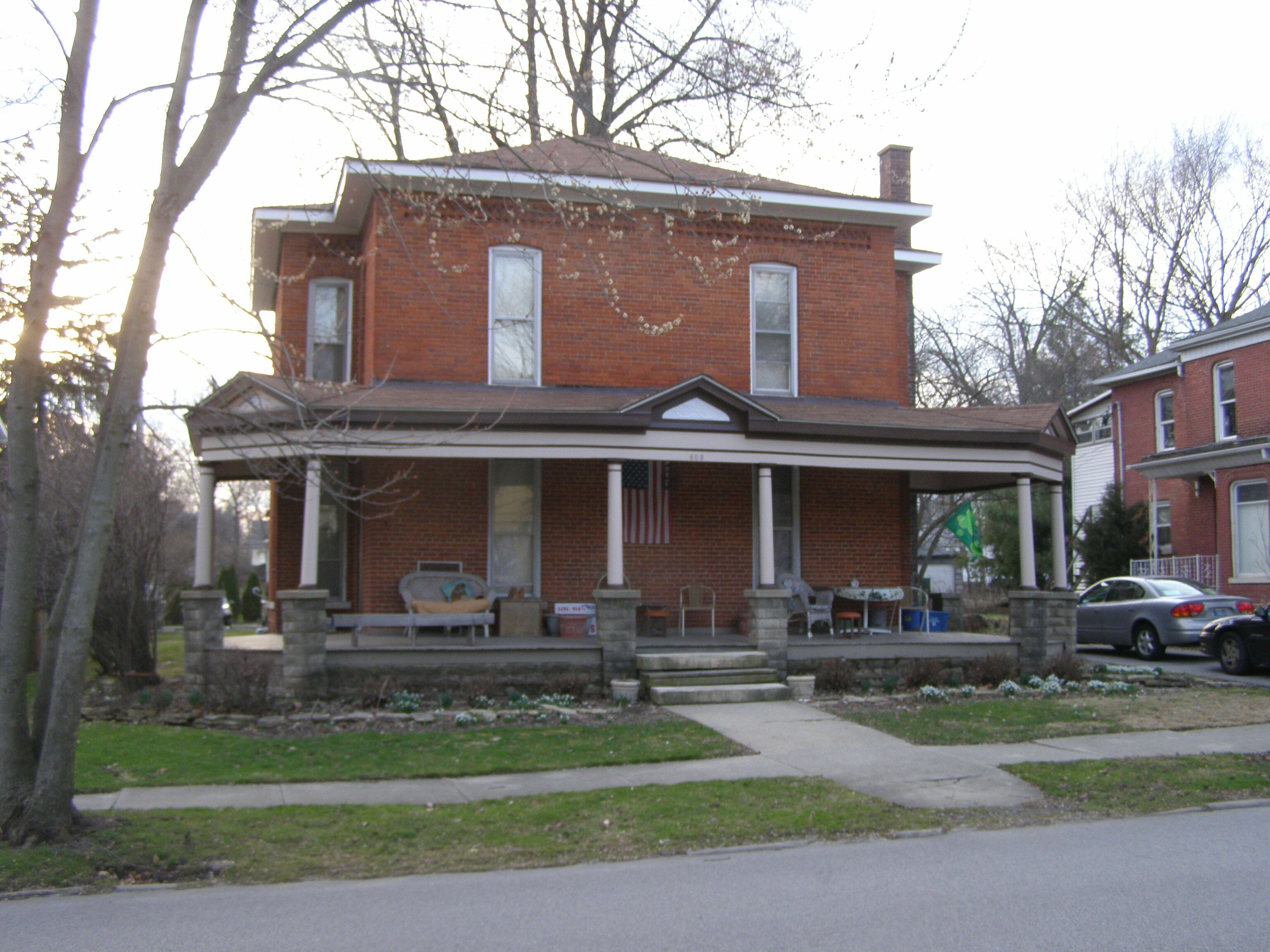
603 N Franklin, A John Wilson House

== See also ==
- Valparaiso Downtown Commercial District
- Haste-Crumpacker House, 208 North Michigan Street

== Sources ==
- Interim Report Porter County Interim Report, Indiana Historic Sites and Structures Inventory; Historic Landmarks Foundation of Indiana; July 1991
