= Valpo Velvet =

Valpo Velvet is a "mom and pop" ice cream shop in Valparaiso, Indiana, United States. It has been owned and run by the Brown family since 1947.

== History ==
=== Company ===
Opened in 1920 as Valparaiso Home Ice Company, the store offered ice and ice cream products. It was owned by Fred Bartz until 1947, upon which time it was purchased by Herbert J. Brown. Since that time ownership of the store has remained in the hands of the Brown family; Gordon Brown began working with his father Herbert in 1949. In 1997 Gordon's sons Mike and Mark expanded the store's parlor to open an ice cream shoppe, however this closed in 2001 so the Brown family could focus on the ice cream business. Throughout the years the Valpo Velvet has operated as a restaurant, a parlor, and in its most recent iteration an ice cream parlor that also serves soups, sandwiches, and salads.

Until 2009 Valpo Velvet ice cream was sold at Walmart stores in the Portage and Michigan City area. Sales for the business increased by $2,000 during their final year at Walmart but despite this success Walmart began allocating less and less room in their store for Valpo Velvet products. During this time co-owner Cathy Brown noted in an interview that, "'Over Labor Day they took us out of the freezer door and moved us to an end cap,' Brown said. 'They tried to say they were trying something new, and, if it did well, they might move us back to the door. I think that was false.'" Brown speculated that their ice cream was removed from stores to be replaced by Walmart's new Great Value brand. With Walmart being one of Valpo Velvet's largest customers, the company had to find another way to make up for lost sales. They decided to reopen the Valpo Velvet Shoppe in 2009, and now they will sell soup and sandwiches in addition to ice cream.

=== Family ===
The Brown family originally immigrated from Switzerland to the United States, where they settled in Monroe, Wisconsin as dairy farmers. Herbert J. Brown grew up in Monroe, Wisconsin and moved to Chicago to work in ice cream production. After realizing he wanted to own his own business, he decided to purchase Valpo Velvet from the previous owner Fred Bartz in 1947. Herbert's son, Gordon W. Brown joined the family business.

Mike Brown, son of Herbert, was only twelve years old when his dad started Brown's Ice Cream Parlor, which was a restaurant. He grew up in Valpo and learned the techniques of running the business of Valpo Velvet from his father.

Cathy Brown is a co-owner of Valpo Velvet with her husband Mike Brown, and also a Valparaiso Native. Cathy worked as a substitute teacher after receiving her degree in Elementary Education from Indiana University. She started working at Valpo Velvet when she married her husband, whose family opened the business in 1947. Mike and Cathy have three children, and both now work full time in the shop. As of 2016, Cathy was appointed to be on the Porter County Convention, Recreation and Visitor’s Commission.

== Products ==
The Brown family makes all of their ice cream from scratch and has a hand in every step of the process. They start by creating their own ice cream mix by heating skim milk, gelatin, cream, and sugar in a large industrial mixer. The ice cream is then pasteurized and homogenized and eventually stored for a night. After that night storage, the Brown family packages their ice cream and stores it again in a large walk in freezer until it is shipped out.

Valpo Velvet has over 75 different flavors that include:

- Chocolate Cookie Dough Ice Cream
- Peanut Butter Cup Ice Cream
- Moose Tracks Ice Cream
- Peppermint Stick Ice Cream
- Brownie Nut Fudge
- Burgundy Cherry Ice Cream
- Velvet Bar
- Mint Chocolate Chip Ice Cream

== Community impact ==
Valpo Velvet has been an active participant in the Valparaiso community and downtown environment for decades. The business contributes to and is present at multiple Valparaiso events, including Taste of Valpo, Friends with Benefits Concert, and Chalk the Walk.
