= List of Indiana state historical markers in Porter County =

Location of Porter County in Indiana

This is a list of the Indiana state historical markers in Porter County.

This is intended to be a complete list of the official state historical markers placed in Porter County, Indiana, United States by the Indiana Historical Bureau. The locations of the historical markers and their latitude and longitude coordinates are included below when available, along with their names, years of placement, and topics as recorded by the Historical Bureau. There are 5 historical markers located in Porter County.

== Historical markers ==
Marker title	Image	Year placed	Location	Topics
Iron Brigade		1995	Along U.S. Route 20 at the southeastern corner of the State Road 49 overpass in Chesterton; 41°38′8″N 87°3′28″W	Military
Willow Creek Confrontation		1995	Southeastern corner of Woodland Park at 2100 Willow Creek Road in Portage; 41°35′20″N 87°11′4″W	Transportation, Business, Industry, and Labor
Ogden Dunes Ski Jump		1997	Kratz Field at 82 Hillcrest Road by Boat Club Road in Ogden Dunes; 41°37′18″N 87°11′26″W	Sports, Special Events
Edwin Way Teale		2009	285 E. U.S. Route 20 in Chesterton; 41°38′58″N 87°0′46″W	Education and Libraries, Nature and Natural Disasters, Newspapers and Media
Legacy of Steel / Burns Harbor Steel Plant		2018	Burns Harbor Town Hall, 1240 N. Boo Rd., Burns Harbor; 41°36′44.3″N 87°07′34.7″W	Business, Industry, and Labor

== See also ==
- List of Indiana state historical markers
- National Register of Historic Places listings in Porter County, Indiana
