= Valparaiso, Indiana =

- City
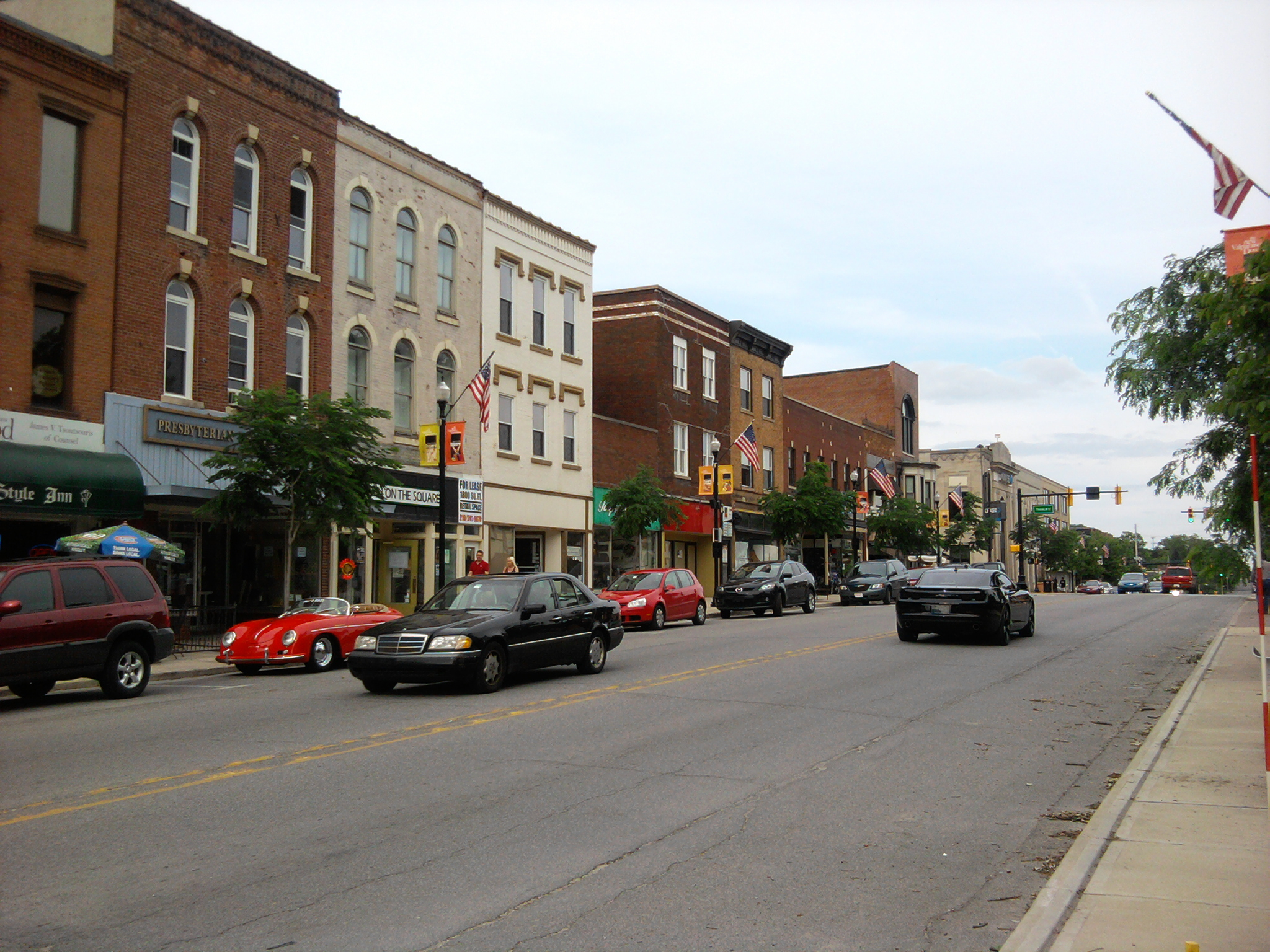
- Lincolnway in downtown Valparaiso

- Flag Seal Logo
- Nickname: Valpo
- Motto: "Vale of Paradise"
- Interactive map of Valparaiso, Indiana
- Location within Indiana Location within the United States
- Coordinates: 41°28′34″N 87°02′25″W
- Country: United States
- State: Indiana
- County: Porter
- Townships: Center, Washington, Morgan
- Incorporated: February 29, 1836
- Named for: Valparaíso, Chile

Government
  - Mayor: Jon Costas (R)

Area
  - Total: 16.44 sq mi (42.57 km^{2})
  - Land: 16.39 sq mi (42.44 km^{2})
  - Water: 0.046 sq mi (0.12 km^{2}) 0.32%
- Elevation: 791 ft (241 m)

Population (2020)
  - Total: 34,151
  - Density: 2,084.1/sq mi (804.68/km^{2})
- Time zone: UTC−6 (CST)
  - Summer (DST): UTC−5 (CDT)
- ZIP codes: 46383-46385
- Area code: 219
- FIPS code: 18-78326
- GNIS feature ID: 2397114
- Website: www.ci.valparaiso.in.us

Valparaiso (/ˌvælpəˈreɪzoʊ/ VAL-pə-RAY-zoh), colloquially Valpo, is a city in and the county seat of Porter County, Indiana, United States. Its population was 34,151 at the 2020 census. It is part of the Chicago metropolitan area.

== History ==
The site of present-day Valparaiso was included in the purchase of land from the Potawatomi people by the U.S. government in October 1832. Chiqua's town or Chipuaw was located a mile east of the current Courthouse along the Sauk Trail. Chiqua's town existed from or before 1830 until after 1832. The location is just north of the railroad crossing on State Route 2 and County Road 400 North.

Located on the ancient Native American trail from Rock Island to Detroit, the town had its first log cabin in 1834. Established in 1836 as "Portersville", county seat of Porter County, it was renamed to Valparaiso (meaning "Vale of Paradise" in Old Spanish) in 1837 after Valparaíso, Chile, near which the county's namesake David Porter battled in the Battle of Valparaiso during the War of 1812. The city was once called the "City of Churches" due to the large number of churches located there at the end of the 19th century. Valparaiso Male and Female College, one of the earliest higher-education institutions admitting both men and women in the country, was founded in Valparaiso in 1859, but closed in 1871 before reopening in 1873 as the Northern Indiana Normal School and Business Institute. In the early 20th century, it became Valparaiso College, then Valparaiso University. It was initially affiliated with the Methodist Church, but after 1925 it affiliated with the Lutheran University Association (which has relationships both with the Lutheran Church Missouri Synod and with the Evangelical Lutheran Church in America) and expanded significantly after World War II.

From the 1890s until 1969, no African-American residents were in Valparaiso. This has been attributed to Valparaiso being a sundown town. Also, substantial activity occurred by the Ku Klux Klan, which negotiated to purchase Valparaiso University in 1923. The first African-American family to move to Valparaiso faced intimidation and eventually left the city when a visiting relative was murdered. In recent years, the city's racial composition has diversified.

Valparaiso also has a long history of being a transportation hub for the region. In 1858, the Pittsburgh, Fort Wayne and Chicago Railroad reached Valparaiso, connecting the city directly to Chicago. By 1910, an interurban railway connected the city to Gary, Indiana. Today, while the city no longer has a passenger train station, it is still very much a part of the "Crossroads of America" due to its proximity to I-65, I-80, I-90, and I-94. Additionally, the Canadian National railroad still runs freight on the tracks, including through the downtown area.

Until 1991, Valparaiso was the terminal of Amtrak's Calumet commuter service.

== Geography ==
The city is situated at the junctions of U.S. Route 30, State Road 2, and State Road 49.

According to the 2010 census, Valparaiso has a total area of 15.578 square miles (40.35 km^{2}), of which 0.048 square miles (0.12 km^{2}) (or 0.31%) is covered by water.

=== Topography ===
The city is situated on the Valparaiso Moraine, a prominent glacial feature formed by receding glaciers and creating a distinct hilly landscape in the region.

Glaciation has left numerous features on the landscape here. Kettle lakes and knobs make up much of this particular area of Northwest Indiana. The Pines Ski Area is the only remaining kame in the city; the other one is under the university's Chapel of the Resurrection; however, grading of land in that area makes that particular kame almost nonexistent. Many glacial erratics can be found throughout the city. The moraine has left the city with mostly clay soil.

=== Climate ===
Climate data for Valparaiso, Porter County Regional Airport, Indiana (1991-2020 normals)
Month	Jan	Feb	Mar	Apr	May	Jun	Jul	Aug	Sep	Oct	Nov	Dec	Year
Record high °F (°C)	66 (19)	72 (22)	87 (31)	90 (32)	98 (37)	105 (41)	102 (39)	101 (38)	96 (36)	89 (32)	77 (25)	70 (21)	105 (41)
Mean daily maximum °F (°C)	33.9 (1.1)	37.9 (3.3)	49.1 (9.5)	62.1 (16.7)	73.0 (22.8)	82.2 (27.9)	85.0 (29.4)	83.3 (28.5)	77.6 (25.3)	65.1 (18.4)	50.5 (10.3)	38.8 (3.8)	61.5 (16.4)
Daily mean °F (°C)	26.2 (−3.2)	29.8 (−1.2)	39.8 (4.3)	50.9 (10.5)	61.7 (16.5)	71.4 (21.9)	74.6 (23.7)	72.8 (22.7)	66.2 (19.0)	54.6 (12.6)	42.3 (5.7)	31.6 (−0.2)	51.8 (11.0)
Mean daily minimum °F (°C)	18.4 (−7.6)	21.8 (−5.7)	30.5 (−0.8)	39.7 (4.3)	50.5 (10.3)	60.5 (15.8)	64.2 (17.9)	62.3 (16.8)	54.8 (12.7)	44.2 (6.8)	34.2 (1.2)	24.5 (−4.2)	42.1 (5.6)
Record low °F (°C)	−26 (−32)	−21 (−29)	−7 (−22)	10 (−12)	26 (−3)	33 (1)	42 (6)	38 (3)	27 (−3)	18 (−8)	2 (−17)	−20 (−29)	−26 (−32)
Average precipitation inches (mm)	2.38 (60)	2.24 (57)	2.63 (67)	3.74 (95)	4.59 (117)	4.33 (110)	4.10 (104)	3.57 (91)	2.92 (74)	3.93 (100)	3.26 (83)	2.58 (66)	40.27 (1,024)
Average snowfall inches (cm)	14.6 (37)	5.5 (14)	6.7 (17)	1.2 (3.0)	0 (0)	0 (0)	0 (0)	0 (0)	0 (0)	0.3 (0.76)	2.3 (5.8)	9.4 (24)	40 (101.56)
Average precipitation days (≥ 0.01 inch)	12.6	8.4	10.2	11.2	13.4	10.9	9.5	9.6	9.1	10	10.9	11	126.8
Source 1: NOAA (temperatures) (precipitation and snow at water pumping station)
Source 2: The Weather Channel (records),

== Demographics ==
Historical population
Census	Pop.	Note	%±
1850	522		—
1860	1,698		225.3%
1870	2,765		62.8%
1880	4,461		61.3%
1890	5,090		14.1%
1900	6,280		23.4%
1910	6,987		11.3%
1920	6,518		−6.7%
1930	8,079		23.9%
1940	8,736		8.1%
1950	12,028		37.7%
1960	15,227		26.6%
1970	20,020		31.5%
1980	22,247		11.1%
1990	24,414		9.7%
2000	27,428		12.3%
2010	31,730		15.7%
2020	34,151		7.6%
Source: US Census Bureau

=== 2020 census ===
As of the 2020 census, Valparaiso had a population of 34,151. The median age was 36.8 years; 20.1% of the residents were under 18 and 17.4% were 65 or older.The female/male ratio was 1:0.920 overall and 1:0.892 for those 18 and over.

Almost all of the residents lived in urban areas, while 0.6% lived in rural areas.

Of the 14,032 households in Valparaiso, 26.7% had children under 18 living in them, 40.6% were married-couple households, 20.7% were households with a male householder and no spouse or partner present, and 31.0% were households with a female householder and no spouse or partner present. About 35.3% of all households were made up of individuals, and 13.1% had someone living alone who was 65 or older.

The city had 14,987 housing units, of which 6.4% were vacant. The homeowner vacancy rate was 1.5% and the rental vacancy rate was 7.3%.

Racial composition as of the 2020 census
Race	Number	Percentage
White	28,117	82.3%
Black or African American	1,391	4.1%
American Indian and Alaska Native	115	0.3%
Asian	784	2.3%
Native Hawaiian and other Pacific Islander	16	0.0%
Some other race	1,147	3.4%
Two or more races	2,581	7.6%
Hispanic or Latino (of any race)	3,259	9.5%

=== 2010 census ===
As of the 2010 census, 31,730 people, 12,610 households, and 7,117 families resided in the city. The population density was 2,043.1 inhabitants per square mile (788.8/km^{2}). The 13,506 housing units had an average density of 869.7 units per square mile (335.8 units/km^{2}). The racial makeup of the city was 89.9% White, 3.3% African American, 0.3% Native American, 2.1% Asian, 0.1% Pacific Islander, 2.2% from other races, and 2.1% from two or more races. Hispanic or Latino people of any race were 7.1% of the population.

Of the 12,610 households, 28.7% had children under 18 living with them, 41.6% were married couples living together, 10.9% had a female householder with no husband present, 3.9% had a male householder with no wife present, and 43.6% were not families. About 34.5% of all households were made up of individuals, and 11.3% had someone living alone who was 65 or older. The average household size was 2.28, and the average family size was 2.99.

The median age in the city was 33.4 years. The age distribution was 21.3% under 18, 15.9% from 18 to 24, 26.9% from 25 to 44, 22.8% from 45 to 64' and 13.1% were 65 or older. The gender makeup of the city was 48.6% male and 51.4% female.

=== 2000 census ===
As of the 2000 census, 27,428 people, 10,867 households, and 6,368 families lived in the city. The population density was 971.6 people/km^{2} (2,516 people/mi^{2}). The 11,559 housing units had an average density of 409.4 units/km^{2} (1,060 units/mi^{2}). The racial makeup of the city was 94.35% White, 1.60% African American, 0.23% Native American, 1.49% Asian, 0.02% Pacific Islander, 0.79% from other races]], and 1.52% from two or more races. Hispanic or Latino people of any race were 3.34% of the population.

Of the 10,867 households, 28.8% had children under 18 living with them, 45.9% were married couples living together, 9.7% had a female householder with no husband present, and 41.4% were not families; 33.4% were made up of individuals and 10.9% had someone living alone who was 65 or older. The average household size was 2.27, and the average family size was 2.93.

In the city, the age distribution was 21.2% under 18, 17.4% from 18 to 24, 28.1% from 25 to 44, 20.2% from 45 to 64, and 13.1% who were 65 or older. The median age was 33 years. For every 100 females, there were 91.8 males. For every 100 females 18 and over, there were 88.5 males.

The median income in the city for a household was $45,799 and for a family was $60,637. Males had a median income of $46,452 versus $26,544 for females. The per capita income for the city was $22,509. About 4.8% of families and 9.1% of the population were below the poverty line, including 8.1% of those under 18 and 7.5% of those age 65 or over.

== Arts and culture ==
- The Valparaiso Downtown Commercial District, Washington Street Historic District, and the Banta Neighborhood feature many historic homes; architectural designs include Italianate, Arts and Crafts, and English/Cotswold.

=== Live theater ===
- Chicago Street Theatre, run by the local Community Theater Guild
- The Memorial Opera House, a musical theater venue
- Valparaiso Theatrical Company, a nonprofit community theatre group focused on providing fund-raising opportunities for other nonprofit organizations through theatrical performances

=== Museums ===
- Brauer Museum of Art at Valparaiso University
- Museum of Fire Fighting
- Porter County Museum, also known as the Old Jail Museum

=== City fairs ===
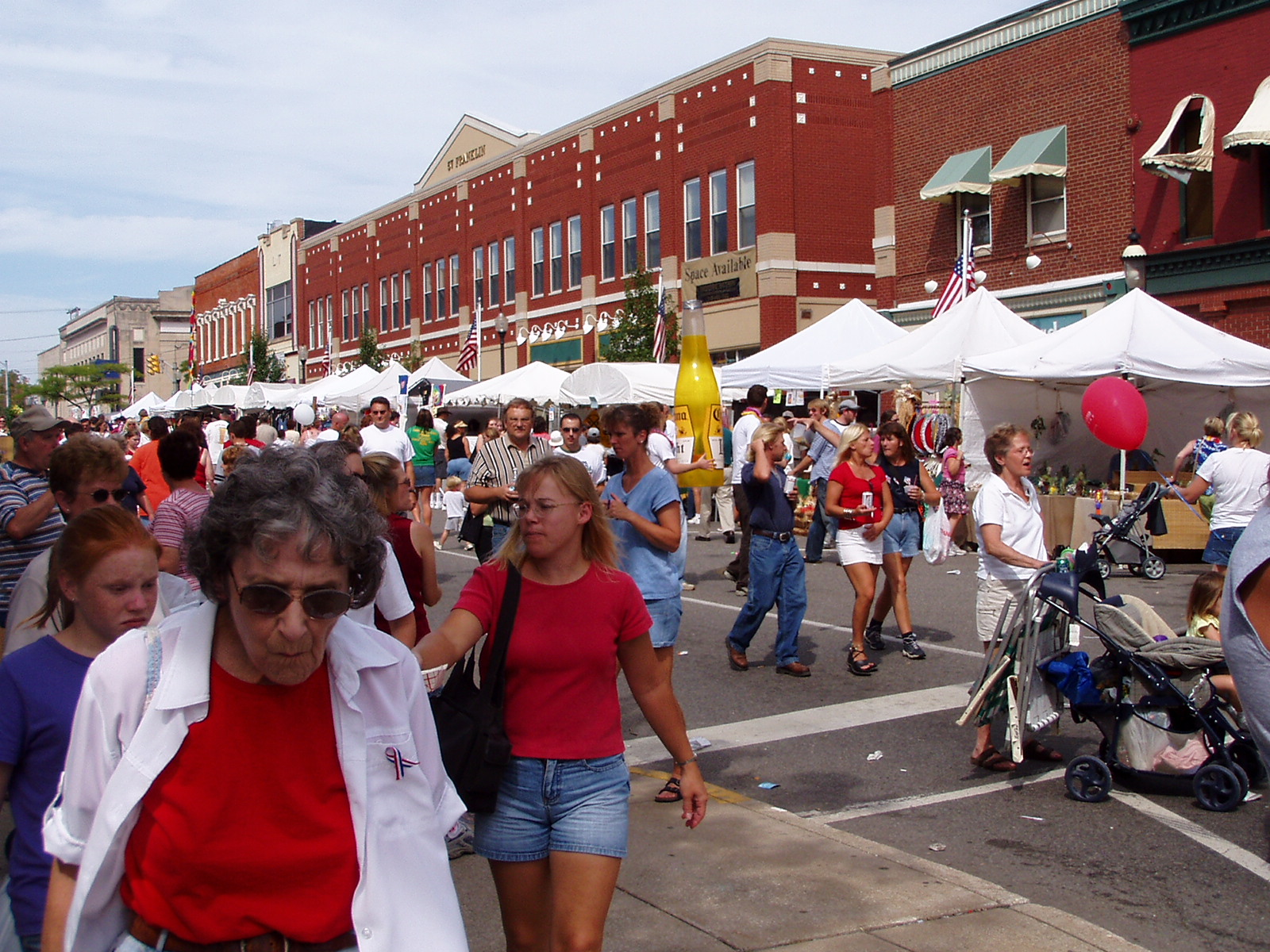
Popcorn Festival

The city holds two major festivals every year, the Popcorn Festival and the Porter County Fair. The Popcorn Festival is held on the first Saturday after Labor Day. It honors Orville Redenbacher, a former resident who built a popcorn factory there. Redenbacher participated in most of the festival's parades until his death in 1995. The festival also features foot racing events and multiple concerts in addition to typical fair activities. The Porter County Fair consists of carnival attractions and hosts a variety of shows such as a demolition derby, motocross races, and live musical performances.

=== Public library ===
Valparaiso has a public library, a branch of the Porter County Public Library System.

=== Historic buildings and districts ===
- Porter County Courthouse replaced an earlier brick building in 1883. The current building is 128 feet by 98 feet. It was built with a square tower rising out of the center. The tower was 168 feet tall with a clock on each side. A fire in 1934 damaged the interior, requiring the removal of the tower.

=== National Register of Historic Places ===
A number of buildings and districts in the city are listed on the National Register of Historic Places.

- Charles S. and Mary McGill House
- Conrad and Catherine Bloch House
- David Garland Rose House
- DeForest Skinner House
- Dr. David J. Loring Residence and Clinic
- Haste-Crumpacker House
- Heritage Hall
- Immanuel Lutheran Church
- Porter County Jail and Sheriff's House
- Porter County Memorial Opera Hall
- Valparaiso Downtown Commercial District
- Washington Street Historic District
- William McCallum House

== Parks and recreation ==
Valparaiso has an extensive city park district. In 2005, the city had 13 parks, with another in the planning stages.

=== Parks ===
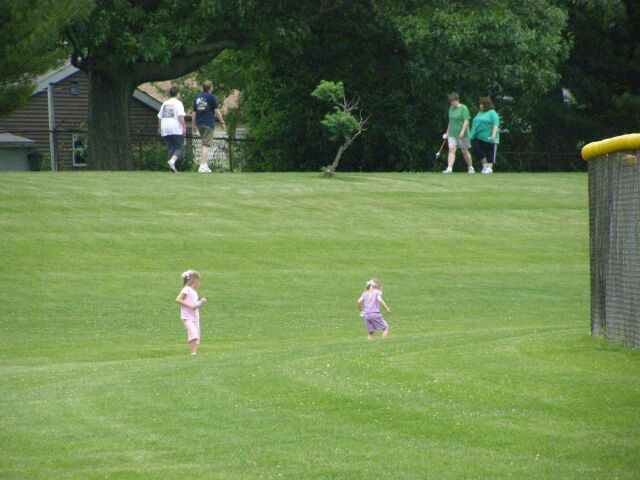
Fairground Park and walking circuit

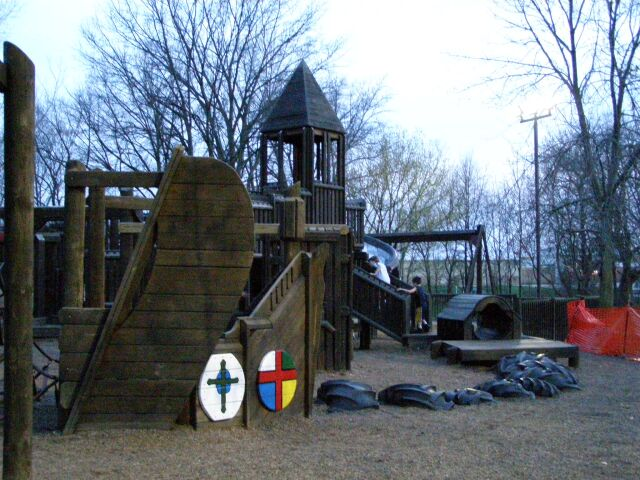
Valplayso

- 200 East (East McCord Rd) – a community park with a playground; where many of the city's legendary athletes played football as youngsters. Football at 200 East Park is a staple for young kids growing up in the neighborhood.
- Bicentennial Park (Burlington Beach Road & Campbell St) – Provides a full range of activities, including a playground, basketball courts, ball diamond and picnic shelters. A prairie restoration is under way in the north half of the park.
- Central Park Plaza (Lincolnway and Lafayette St) – is the centerpiece of the Downtown Valparaiso revitalization and opened the summer of 2011. It has an outdoor amphitheater for concerts and other special events as well as a splash pad in the center of the park for kids to play.
- Fairgrounds Park (Calumet & Evans Avenues) – Has the largest complex of ball diamonds and soccer fields in the city. A playground and basketball court are available. Numerous city sports leagues use Fairgrounds Park for their games and tournaments. The park is surrounded by a paved walking circuit that is well occupied on nice days.
- Foundation Meadows (Campbell Street & Bullseye Lake Rd) – One of the city's newer parks
- Glenrose South (1500 Roosevelt Road) – Provides several ball diamonds and when school is out, Thomas Jefferson Middle Schools track is available for those interested in walking. Glenrose South has been the home of the Valparaiso Fourth of July Fireworks display and celebration since 2005.
- Jessee-Pifer Park (Elmhurst & Madison Streets) – a community park with a basketball court and picnic shelter
- Kirchhoff Miller Woods (Roosevelt Road & Institute St) – a community park that provides for basketball, baseball, tennis, picnicking and a playground
- Ogden Gardens/Forest Park (Campbell Street and Harrison Blvd) – Ogden Gardens is the home of the city's botanical garden. The Campbell Street end is a formal garden with a variety of planting that bloom throughout the year. The gazebo is a favorite place for weddings, wedding pictures and high school prom pictures. A Japanese garden is included with a 22,000-gallon Koi pond. Forest Park is to the west with an open grassy picnic area below a wooded picnic area with a shelter.
- Rock Island (Coolwood Dr &, Frontage Rd) – a tourist attraction found in front of the Strack & Van Til grocery store just off of the US 30 highway. The curb that splits the right and left turn lanes has been responsible for a number car crashes and accidents. Over the weekend between May 17 and May 19 of 2024, community members decorated the curb with rocks, signs, traffic cones, and other miscellaneous decor, including a flamingo and a blanket for one of the rocks. This has since been considered an inside joke, featuring its own Google reviews as an official tourist attraction.
- Rogers-Lakwood Park (Meridian Road (N Campbell St)) – Provide opportunities for swimming, fishing, and hiking trails. It is connected to the north side communities of Valparaiso by the Campbell Street Bike Trail (hiking and biking).
- Tower Park (Evans Ave and Franklin St) – a community park that offers basketball, baseball, tennis, pickleball, picnicking, and a playground. During winter months, one of the basketball courts is turned into the community skating rink.
- Valplayso/Glenrose North (Glendale Blvd and Roosevelt Rd) – the home of Valplayso, a community-designed and community-built playground. At the other end of the parking lot are several ball fields. Separated from Glenrose South by only the Middle Schools track, Glenrose North hosts over half of the community during the Fourth of July Celebration.
- West Side Park (Joliet Rd) – a community park with a ball field and a playground
- Will Park (Morgan Blvd and Brown St) – a community park with a basketball court, playground, and picnic shelter

=== Golf ===
- Valparaiso Country Club
- Forest Park
- Creekside
- Mink Lake (closed)
- The Course at Aberdeen

=== Bike trails ===
Valparaiso is building a series of bike trails across the city. As of March 2012, most of the identified bike routes were part of the county's system of recommended roads and streets.

=== Biking and hiking ===
Campbell Street Bikeway runs from Rogers-Lakewood Park south 2.5 miles (4.0 km) to Vale Park Road (CR 400 N). It continues south on the opposite side of Campbell St. base Valparaiso High School, ending 2 miles (3.2 km) south at Ogden Gardens (Harrison Blvd).

At Vale Park, it connects to the Vale Park trail to Valparaiso Street 1 mile (1.6 km). A new bike loop 3 miles (4.8 km) is being built that circles north along Valparaiso Street to Bullseye Lake Rd, east to Cumberland Crossing (not open to the public as of 2008), south to Vale Park, turning west to on Vale Park to return to the corner of Vale Park and Valparaiso Street.

At Glendale, the Campbell Street Bikeway connects to the Glendale cross town bike lane. These travel east 2 miles (3.2 km) on Glendale, ending on North Calumet at the Walgreens corner.

== Government ==
Valparaiso has an elected mayor, an elected clerk-treasurer, and an elected council. All of these positions are elected for four-year terms in November of the year before a presidential election year and assume office on January 1.

== Education ==
=== Higher education ===
Valparaiso University, founded in 1859, occupies 310 acres (130 ha) on the south side of the city near downtown. The university is a cultural center of the city, hosting venues such as the Brauer Museum of Art, with more than 2,700 pieces of 19th- and 20th-century American art.

Ivy Tech operates one of its 23 regional campuses in the city. From 2006 until 2016, Purdue University North Central had a two-building satellite campus in Valparaiso.

=== Primary and secondary education ===
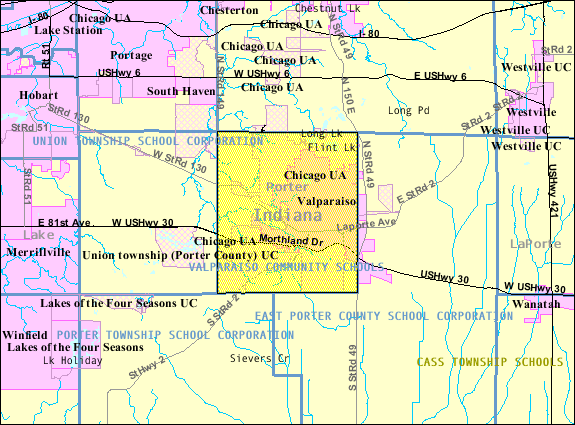
Valparaiso Community Schools covers all of Center Township and most of the city of Valparaiso (that which is within Center Township).

- Public schools
  - Valparaiso Community Schools
    - Valparaiso High School
    - Porter County Career and Technical Center
    - Benjamin Franklin Middle School
    - Thomas Jefferson Middle School
    - Central Elementary
    - Cooks Corner Elementary School
    - Heavilin Elementary
    - Flint Lake Elementary School
    - Thomas Jefferson Elementary School
    - Memorial Elementary
    - Northview Elementary School
    - Parkview Elementary
  - East Porter County School Corporation
    - Washington Township Middle-High School; serves part of the city of Valparaiso
- Private schools
  - Immanuel Lutheran School (K-8)
  - Montessori School of Valparaiso
  - Saint Paul's Catholic School (K-8)
  - Victory Christian Academy (K-12)

== Media ==
=== Newspapers ===
Valparaiso is served by two regional newspapers:

- The Times of Northwest Indiana (or NWI Times), was founded in 1906 and is the second largest of Indiana's 76 daily newspapers. It is based on Munster.
- The Post-Tribune of Northwest Indiana was founded in 1907, serving the Northwest Indiana region. The paper is owned by Tribune Company and is based in Merrillville.

=== Magazines ===
North Valpo Neighbors and South Valpo Neighbors are published in Valparaiso.

=== Radio ===
The primary local radio stations are WLJE 105.5 FM "Indiana 105", which broadcasts country music, WAKE 1500 AM, which plays adult standards, and WVLP 98.3 FM "ValpoRadio", a non-profit, low power FM community radio station. Valparaiso formerly had a fourth local station, WNWI 1080 AM, which relocated to Oak Lawn, Illinois in 1998 and is now a Chicago-market station. Radio is usually from the Chicago market.

== Infrastructure ==
Valparaiso gets all of its water from wells that draw water from depths between 90 and 120 feet (37 m). The supply is treated with chlorine solution to remove the iron. Valparaiso also has three sewer retention basins.

Valparaiso's energy is provided by NIPSCO. The Schaeffer Power Plant is located south of Valparaiso, in Wheatfield.

A city bus service, the V-Line, was founded in 2007. It operates between downtown, the university, shopping centers, the city's northern neighborhoods, and Dune Park station of the Northern Indiana Commuter Transit District.

On October 6, 2008, Valparaiso inaugurated an express bus service to and from Chicago, Illinois, called ChicaGo DASH. Buses depart Valparaiso on weekday mornings and return from Chicago in the evenings.

Valparaiso is served by four highways. U.S. Route 30 is the major east–west artery on the southern side of the city. Indiana State Road 49, the major north–south artery, connects with Chesterton, Indiana and the Indiana Toll Road. Indiana State Road 130 runs northwest to Hobart, Indiana. Indiana State Road 2, which connects South Bend and Lowell, passes through the southeast corner of the city.

Three railroads pass through the city. The Norfolk Southern Railway operates on the tracks that were previously the Nickel Plate Road, the Canadian National is the former Grand Trunk Western Railroad, and the Chicago, Fort Wayne and Eastern Railroad operates on the tracks that were previously used by the Pennsylvania Railroad.

== Notable people ==
- Douglas J. Adams, U.S. Navy admiral
- Newton Arvin, literary critic
- John L. Bascom, politician
- Harry Benham, actor
- Beulah Bondi, actress
- Mary Blatchley Briggs (1846– 1910), writer and women's organizer
- Kevin L. Brown, former Major League Baseball (MLB) player
- Mark N. Brown, astronaut
- Josephine Cochrane, invented and patented the modern dishwasher
- Bryce Drew, professional basketball player in the National Basketball Association (NBA)
- Michael Essany, reality television talk show host and author
- Gina Fattore, producer and writer of Dawson's Creek, Gilmore Girls, Parenthood and showrunner of Dare Me
- Chris Funk, guitarist for the Decemberists
- Henry C. Gordon, astronaut
- Mark A. Heckler, 18th president of Valparaiso University
- Zach Holmes, new Jackass member
- Robbie Hummel, professional basketball player in the NBA since 2012
- Mike Kellogg, retired Moody Radio announcer
- Samuel Austin Kendall, politician
- Hub Knolls, former pitcher in Major League Baseball
- Heather Kuzmich, 4th runner-up of America's Next Top Model, Cycle 9
- Earl F. Landgrebe, politician, staunch defender of Richard Nixon
- Charles F. Lembke, architect and contractor. He built many downtown area buildings.
- David E. Lilienthal, politician
- Sean Manaea, professional baseball player in MLB
- Orville Redenbacher, hybrid popcorn developer
- Henry P. Rusk, dean of the Department of Agriculture at the University of Illinois
- Jeff Samardzija, professional baseball player in MLB
- Carly Schroeder, actress
- Walter Wangerin, Jr., author and professor at Valparaiso University
- R. Harold Zook, architect

== See also ==
- List of cities in Indiana
- List of sundown towns in the United States
- Valpo Velvet
