= Charles S. and Mary McGill House =

Historic house in Indiana, United States

- U.S. National Register of Historic Places
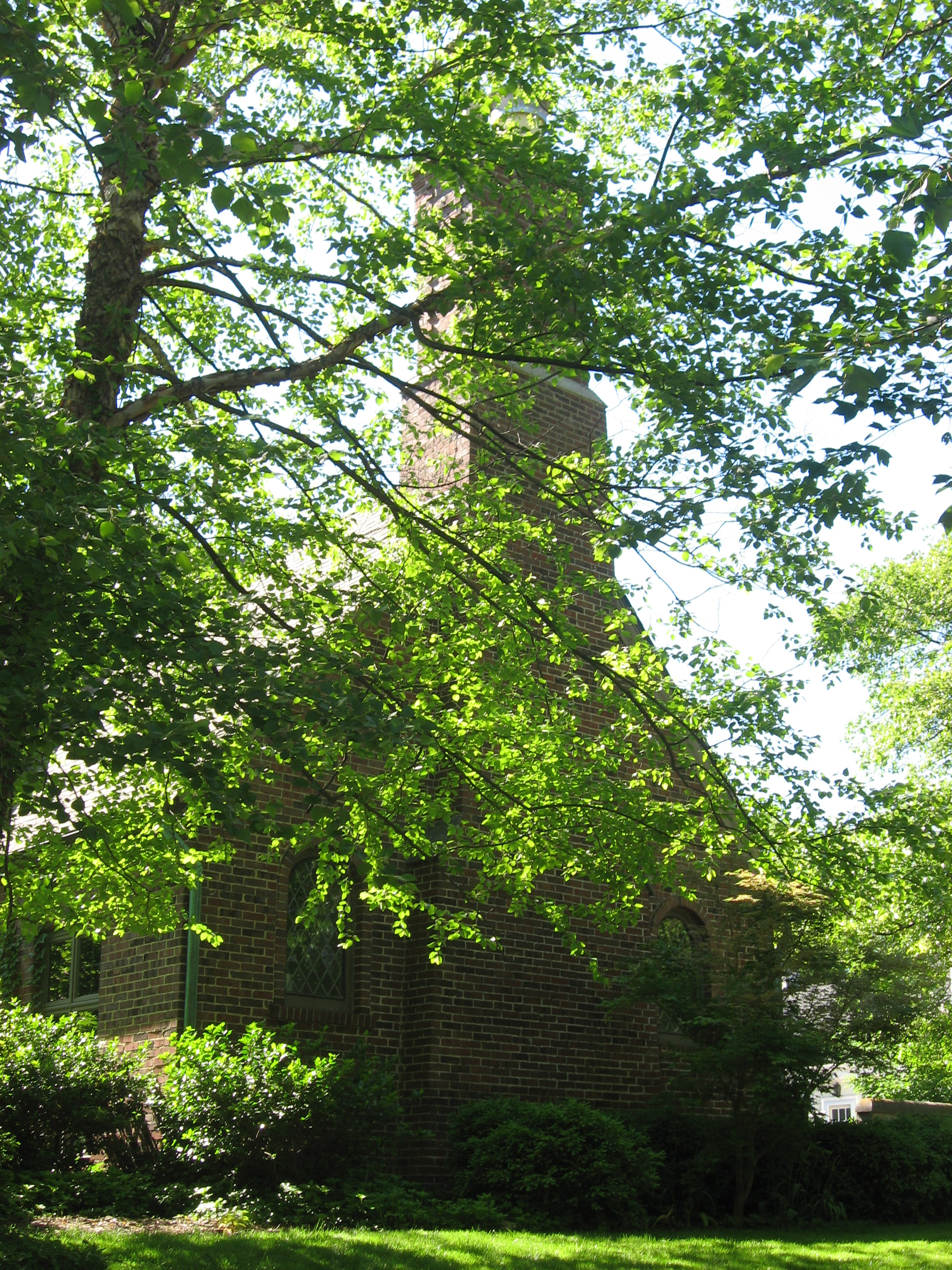
- Charles S. and Mary McGill House, June 2014

- Location within Indiana Location within the United States
- Location: 505 N. Washington St., Valparaiso, Indiana
- Coordinates: 41°28′22″N 87°03′41″W
- Area: Less than 1 acre (0.40 ha)
- Built: 1926
- Built by: Smith, Byron
- Architect: Walcott, Russell; Trump, Charles
- Architectural style: Tudor Revival
- NRHP reference No.: 13000426
- Added to NRHP: June 25, 2013

Charles S. and Mary McGill House is a historic home located at Valparaiso, Indiana. It was built in 1926, and is a two-story, Z-shaped Tudor Revival style brick dwelling. It has a steeply pitched cross-hipped roof and features stuccoed areas with half-timbering and massive chimneys.

It was listed on the National Register of Historic Places in 2013.
