= David Garland Rose House =

Historic house in Indiana, United States

- U.S. National Register of Historic Places
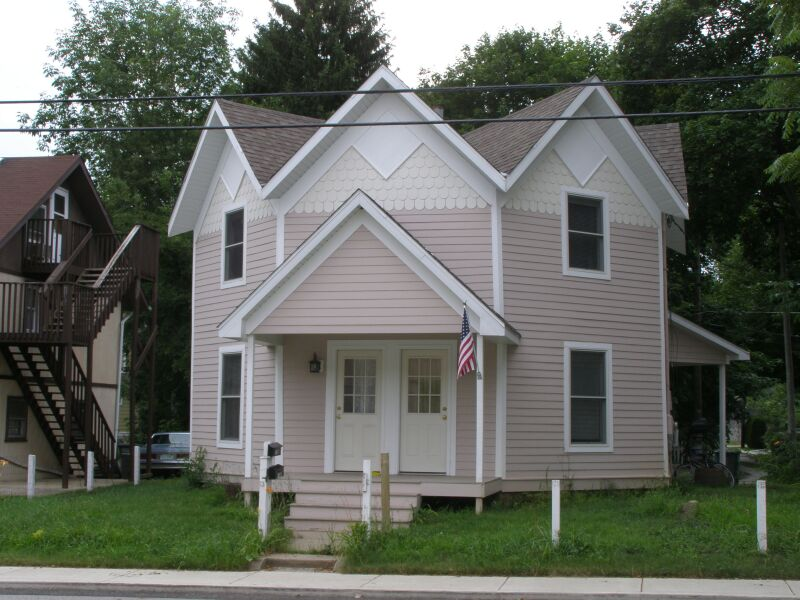
- summer 2010

- Location within Indiana Location within the United States
- Interactive map showing the location of David Garland Rose House
- Location: 156 Garfield St., Valparaiso, Indiana
- Coordinates: 41°27′58″N 87°3′5″W
- Area: less than one acre
- Built: 1860
- Architect: Rose, David Garland
- Architectural style: Gothic Revival, Octagonal Mode
- NRHP reference No.: 80000030
- Added to NRHP: July 17, 1980

The David Garland Rose House was built circa 1860 in Valparaiso, Indiana, United States. David Rose was a local businessman. This Gothic Revival house is unusual in that it is eight-sided, an octagon. Each of the eight gables include decorated wood panels. Covered porches have been added to three sides.

The octagon house rose in popularity in 1849 with the publication of Orson Squire Fowler's book A Home For All. The idea was to develop affordable and comfortable housing for the working class. Fowler proposed the use of concrete due to its long life and low cost. Most octagon houses are of wood or brick construction. The "octagon craze" was short-lived and pre-dates the American Civil War. Fewer than 120 octagon houses survive.

== David Rose ==
David Rose was a successful business man in Valparaiso. At the start of the American Civil War, he was appointed as Colonel Rose, Commandant of the 54th Indiana Volunteer Infantry at Camp Morton, Indiana.

== Design ==
The Rose Octagonal House is a two-story octagon house of frame construction. The exterior is covered with clapboard siding. Each of the eight sides has a gable roof. A brick chimney runs up the center of the house. The Gothic Revival design is evident in the leaf like pendants cut into its bargeboard trim. Also of Gothic design is a four pointed design at the peak of each gable.

Each one of the eight sides is exactly 12' 2" or 12.1666 feet (3.7084 m) long. A one-story porch, added at a later date, runs the length of the front face. An addition had been added to the back of the house. The addition was two stories with an attached garage. The interior has all the original casings for the doors and windows. The floor has been replaced with narrow tongue and groove oak.

== Significance ==
The David Garland Rose House is architecturally important because of its rare octagonal design, combined with its one-of-a-kind treatment of the roof. Constructed about 1860, the house's octagonal design resulted from a short-lived style popularized by Orson Squire Fowler's, A Home for All or the Gravel Wall and Octagonal Mode of Building, published in 1848. Octagon-shaped houses are rare in Indiana. Less than a dozen are known to be extant. Unlike other octagonal houses in Indiana, each side of the Rose House is gabled, and the eight gabled roofs meet at the center.
