= Haste-Crumpacker House =

Historic house in Indiana, United States

- U.S. National Register of Historic Places
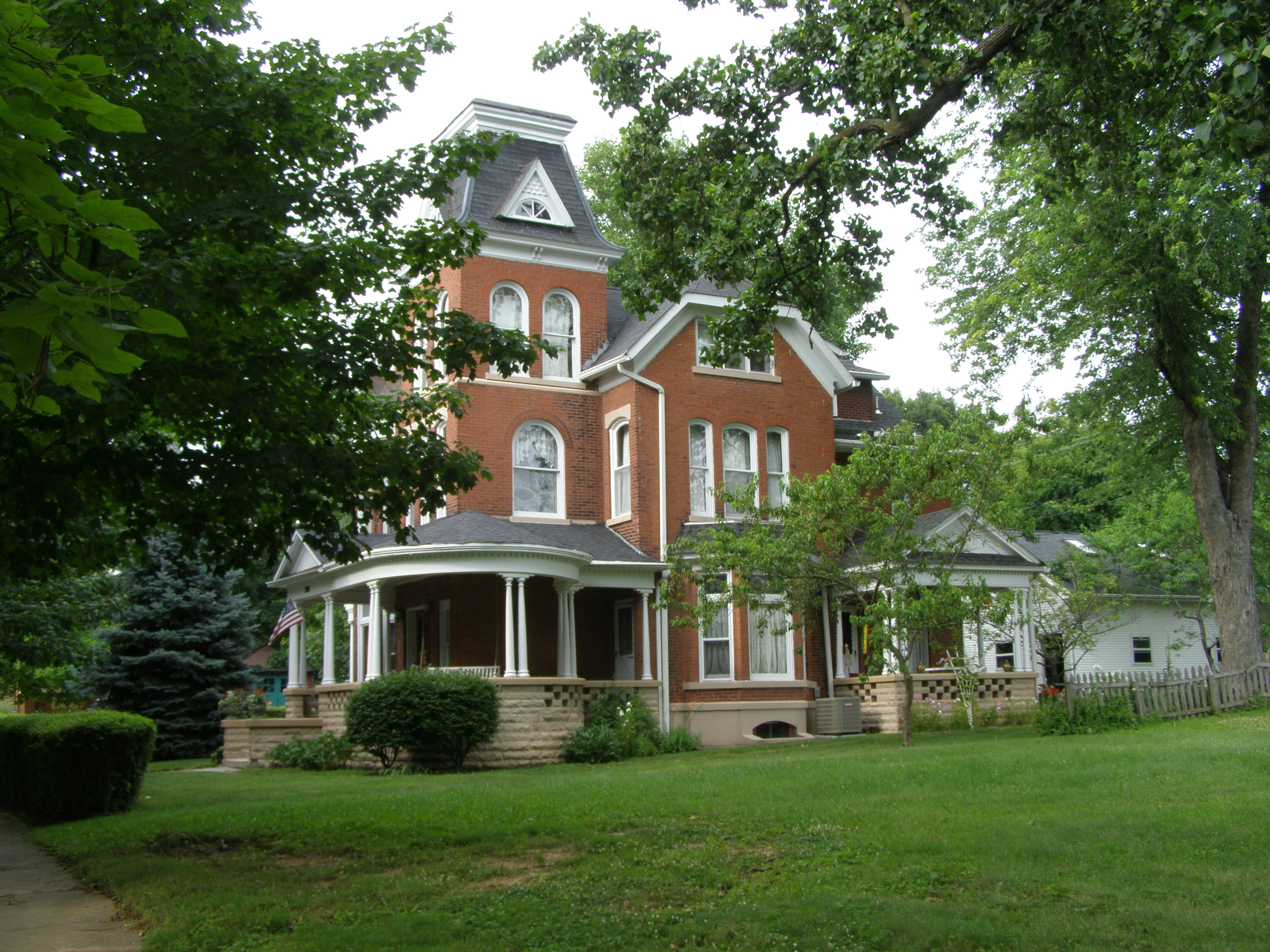
- summer 2010

- Location within Indiana
- Location: 208 N Michigan St, Valparaiso, Indiana
- Coordinates: 41°28′11.66″N 87°3′29.58″W
- Area: less than 1 acre (0.40 ha)
- NRHP reference No.: 10000374
- Added to NRHP: June 24, 2010

The Haste-Crumpacker House, in Valparaiso, Indiana, was built in 1887.

According to the National Park Service:

The Haste-Crumpacker House is a locally outstanding example of Late Victorian Eclectic architecture. The style and methods of construction reflect an era of prosperity for the city of Valparaiso as well as the advancement in construction technologies. Built for George Haste in 1887, the elegant home was described in local newspapers of the time as an “elegant residence” and a “substantial improvement to Valparaiso,” reflecting the social importance and economic prosperity that much of Indiana experienced in the decades following the Civil War.

It's one of 17 individual properties nominated for the National Register by Partners in Preservation.

The building was listed on the U.S. National Register of Historic Places on June 24, 2010. The listing was announced as the featured listing in the National Park Service's weekly list of July 2, 2010.
