= Immanuel Lutheran Church (Valparaiso, Indiana) =

Historic church in Indiana, United States

- U.S. National Register of Historic Places
- Indiana Register of Historic Sites
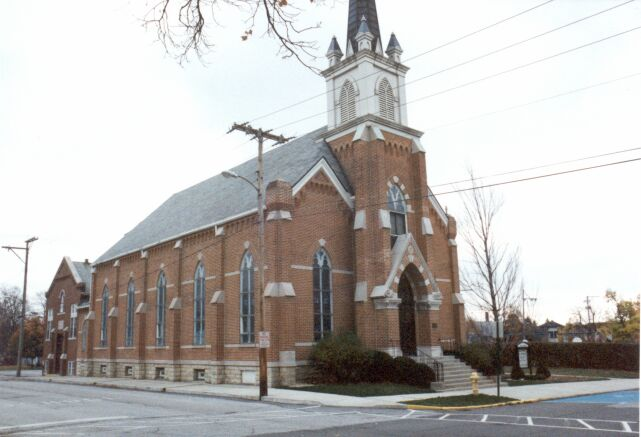

- Location within Indiana Location within the United States
- Location: 308 N. Washington St., Valparaiso, Indiana
- Coordinates: 41°28′16″N 87°3′38″W
- Built: 1891
- Architect: William G. Bowser
- Architectural style: Gothic, Victorian Gothic
- NRHP reference No.: 82000028
- Added to NRHP: February 19, 1982

The congregation of Immanuel Lutheran Church in Valparaiso, Indiana, was founded in 1862 by 69 German families. The first pastor was the Rev. Johan Heinrich Hermann Meyer. The church building was erected in 1891 by Henry Lemster and his son, Charles. A fire gutted the building in 1975, marks of which can still be seen on the altar and pews. The Immanuel Lutheran congregation moved to a new site on Glendale Boulevard, while 60 members formed a new congregation named Heritage Lutheran Church and restored the historic building.

An undated old photo shows a taller steeple and a two-story parsonage adjacent to the parish hall, which is no longer extant. A photo from the courthouse tower northward, c. 1900, shows the taller steeple on the church.

The building was placed on the National Register of Historic Places in 1982.

== Immanuel Lutheran School ==
=== Immanuel Lutheran School ===
Immanuel Lutheran School, located on Monticello Park Drive and Glendale Boulevard, was founded in 1891. It is partnered with the new Immanuel Lutheran Church. Immanuel is a member of the Lutheran Church–Missouri Synod and claims to have education which is "grounded in faith and inspired towards excellence". With a goal of teaching a new generation of Lutherans in education, faith, and service, Immanuel's education spans kindergarten through 8th grade. Throughout the last 20 years, Immanuel has made investments and improvements aimed at creating a better learning environment for kids. This includes its special education program, which directs its focus to children in kindergarten through eighth grade with special learning needs and disabilities such as autism and asthma.
