= DeForest Skinner House =

Historic house in Indiana, United States

- U.S. National Register of Historic Places
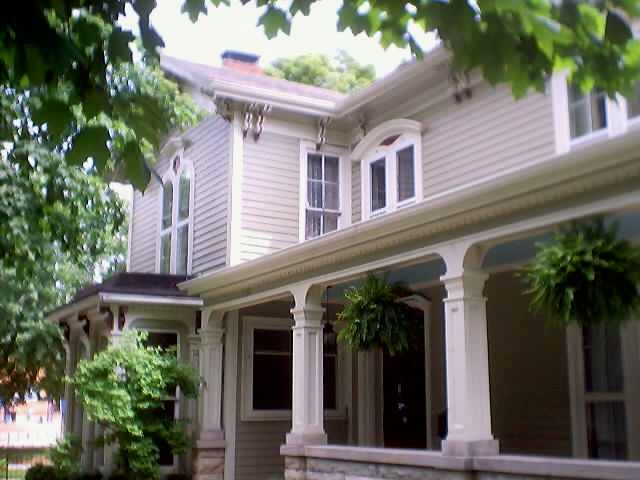

- Location within Indiana Location within the United States
- Location: 208 Washington St, Valparaiso, Indiana
- Coordinates: 41°28′14″N 87°3′39″W
- Area: less than one acre
- Built: c. 1860
- Architectural style: Italianate, Upright & wing
- NRHP reference No.: 08000568
- Added to NRHP: June 24, 2008

The DeForest Skinner House or Skinner Homestead, is a place on the National Register of Historic Places in Valparaiso, Indiana. It was placed on the Register on June 24, 2008. Built around 1860, it is a two-story carpentered Italianate structure with a double brick foundation, weatherboard walls, and asphalt roof, located three blocks north of the Porter County Courthouse. The register listing includes a carriage stepping stone by the north porch, with the family name upon it.

DeForest Skinner acquired the recently built house around the time he married Rachel Ann Maxwell in 1861. Skinner had arrived in Valparaiso in 1847 at age eleven with his parents John and Emily Skinner; he displayed business acumen early in life as he worked for various commercial interests. From 1874 to 1878, as a member of the Republican Party, he served as a member of the Indiana Senate. Then in 1880 and 1888 he represented his area at the Democratic National Conventions. He also served as the President of the First National Bank from 1887 until his death in 1902. He was also Indiana's representative at the World's Congress of Bankers in 1893. Furthermore, he was on the Chicago and Grand Trunk Railroad's board of directors. His death in 1902 occurred in the house.

Upon Skinner's death, the house was under control of his son Leslie Reid Skinner, born in 1873. Leslie became the railroad's director after his father's death, making him the youngest railroad director in the United States. Leslie and his wife sold the house in 1919 to Louis Szold, who lived in the house until 1946. Szold started renting out the house in 1930, and subsequent owners continued to use the house as apartments until December 2005, when current owners Kirk and Caroline Conner began renovating the house.
