= 1933 Homes of Tomorrow Exhibition =

Part of the 1933 Chicago World's Fair

Flier from the Good Housekeeping Stran-Steel Home tour

The Homes of Tomorrow Exhibition was part of the 1933 Chicago World's Fair. The Fair's theme that year was a Century of Progress, and celebrated man's innovations in architecture, science, technology and transportation. The "Homes of Tomorrow" exhibition was one of the most noteworthy exhibits of the Fair, and showcased man's modern innovations in architecture, design, and building materials.

In addition to several unique art deco and contemporary designs for a dozen model homes, futuristic home furnishings and accoutrements such as a personal helicopter pad were anticipated. Several architects and firms used the model homes to demonstrate their techniques for the pre-fabricated home and new materials. Baked enamel and Rostone — a man-made type of masonry that could be molded into specific shapes and produced in various colors — were hailed as affordable and durable home construction options.

Five of the houses exist today viewable to the public, as the Century of Progress Architectural District.

== Exhibits ==
The following homes were showcased in the exhibit which ran the duration of the fair:

- Weiboldt-Rostone House, Walter Schuler, Architect
- Good Housekeeping Stran-Steel House and Stran-Steel Garden Home, O'Dell & Wirt C. Rowland, Architects
- House of Tomorrow, George Fred Keck, Architect
- Masonite House: Frazier & Raftery, Architects
- Armco Ferro Enamel Frameless Steel House, Robert Smith Jr., Architect
- House for Brick Manufacturers Association of America: Andrew N. Rebori, Architect
- Florida Tropical House, Robert Law Weed, Architect
- American Forest Products & Lumber Industries House: Ernest A. Grunsfeld Jr., Architect
- General House, Inc., Howard T. Fisher, Architect
- Design for Living Home, John C.B. Moore and Horsley & Wood, Architects
- Cypress Log Cabin
- Universal Houses' Country Home.

== Legacy ==
After the exposition ended in 1934, Robert Bartlett purchased five of the homes, the Wieboldt-Rostone House, the House of Tomorrow, the Florida Tropical House, the Cypress Log Cabin, and the Armco-Ferro House, loaded them on barges and floated them across Lake Michigan to Beverly Shores, Indiana. The original homes have survived the last 75 years on the shores of Lake Michigan and are being restored through a partnership between the National Park Service, Indiana, the Indiana Landmarks, and private individuals. As visitors passed through the homes during the fair, many bought plans and erected the designs in other states.

Also at the close of the exposition, in November 1934, the Lumber Industries House (designed by architect Ernest A. Grunsfeld Jr.) was sold to Harry Joseph. A Chicago lumber company executive, Joseph had the home taken down and shipped to his estate in Manitowish Waters, Wisconsin, where it was reassembled.

== References and sources ==
Sources

- Century of Progress Anticipates Homes of Tomorrow. American Home, 10:18-19, June 1933.
- Chicago and Tomorrow's House? Pencil Points, 14:245-251, June 1933.
- Exhibits at Century of Progress Exhibition: Houses Constructed for the Home and Industrial Arts Exhibit (Floor Plans).
- Architectural Record, 73: supplement, May 1933.
