= Century of Progress Architectural District =

Historic district in Indiana, United States

- Beverly Shores–Century of Progress Architectural District
- U.S. National Register of Historic Places
- U.S. Historic district
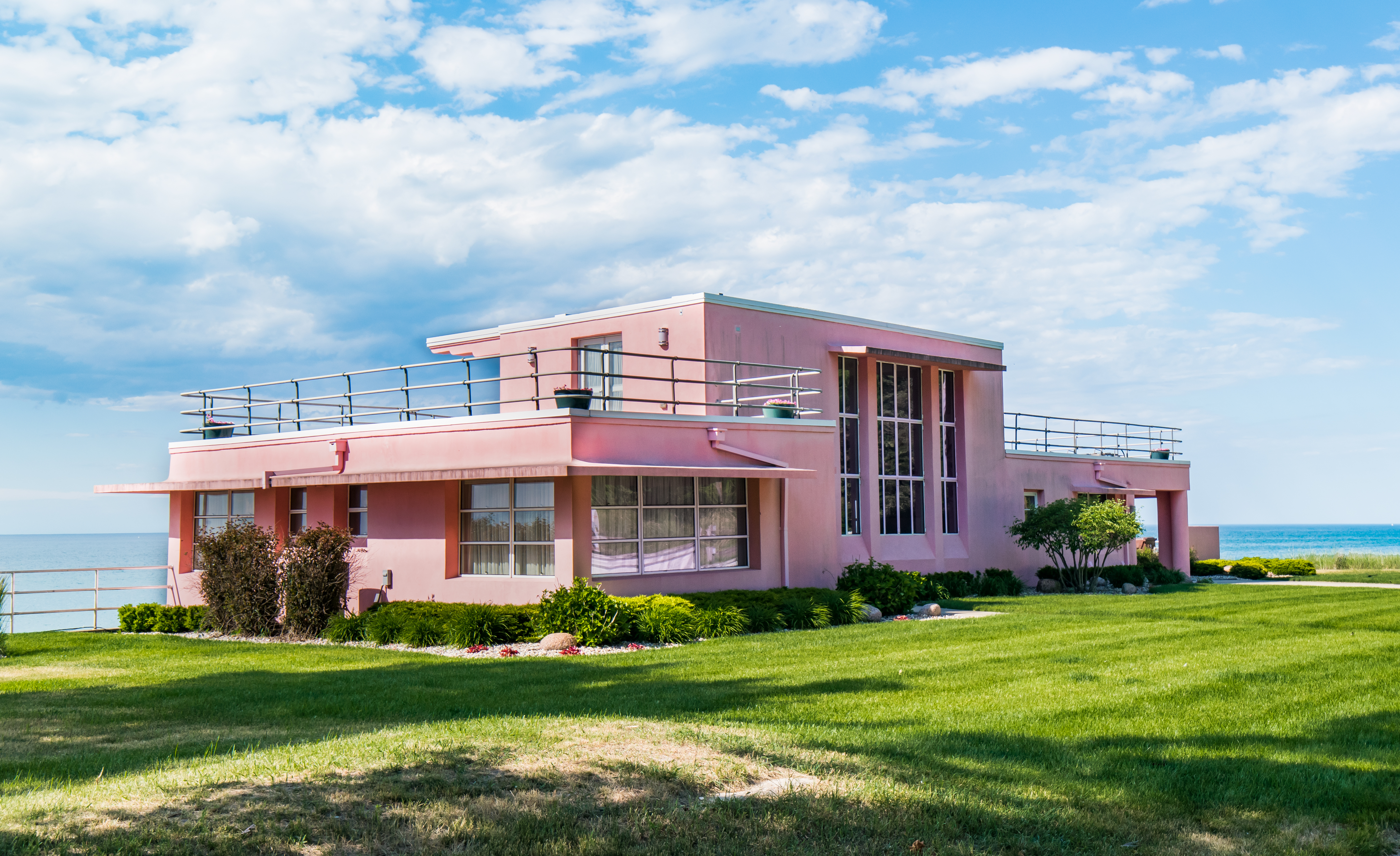
- The Florida Tropical House, one of five houses in the district
- Interactive map of the district and its houses
- Location: 208, 210, 212, 214, and 215 Lake Front Dr., Beverly Shores, Indiana
- Coordinates: 41°41′3″N 87°0′6″W
- Built: 1933
- Architects: Walter Scholer, et al.
- NRHP reference No.: 86001472
- Added to NRHP: June 30, 1986

The Century of Progress Architectural District is a historic district in Beverly Shores, Indiana. The district is on Lake Shore Drive within the Indiana Dunes National Park. The district comprises five buildings, all from the Homes of Tomorrow Exhibition of the 1933 Century of Progress World's Fair which took place in Chicago. Intended to display the future of housing, the Century of Progress Homes reflect a variety of designs, experimental materials and new technologies. On June 30, 1986, the district was listed on the National Register of Historic Places as the Beverly Shores–Century of Progress Architectural District.

== Architecture ==
The Beverly Shores/Century of Progress Architectural District is significant because it encompasses houses from the 1933–34 Chicago Century of Progress Exposition that comprised a portion of the Home and Industrial Arts Group. These structures were innovative and included engineering and construction technologies that are integral parts of modern residential architecture.

During the 1893 Columbian Exposition, the classicism of the French Beaux Arts tradition was popular along with the eclectic revivals of the Victorian architectural periods. This trend dominated American architecture during the first part of the twentieth century. Forty years later, Chicago's Century of Progress Exposition was the national showcase for new directions in American architecture, which once again followed a European precedent, the 1925 Paris Exposition." The Century of Progress Exposition was conceived in the prosperous 1920s, but the nation was deep in the Great Depression by the opening date. Modern technology, the general theme of the exposition, gave the nation something new during a bleak economic period. New materials, nontraditional construction methods, and efficient, new mechanical systems came together." Electric floodlights, searchlights and neon highlighted the polychromed facades and stylized motifs of the major exhibition buildings. The architecture of the Century of Progress Exposition was progressive, which meant either the Art Deco or International Style.."

== Move to Beverly Shores, Indiana ==
After the closing of the 1933 World's Fair, in late winter 1935 the Century of Progress houses were moved from Chicago to Indiana. Robert Bartlett purchased the homes with the intent of using them to sell more properties in his new residential development called Beverly Shores. Owing to their lakefront location in Chicago and their future lakefront location in Indiana, it was determined the easiest way to transport the homes was by barge. The houses were rolled off the barge on telephone poles onto a heavy timber crib built out into the lake. There were a series of three steps used to raise the houses to the level of Lake Front Drive.

== Contributing properties ==
The five contributing properties in the architectural district are:

Name	Image	Current address	Description	Architect	Style
Armco-Ferro House		212 Lake Front Dr.	The only house of the five to stand the test of time in meeting the criteria of the World's Fair Committee: 'affordable' and 'mass producible'. An all-steel home using corrugated steel panels for walls, without a frame.	Scholer, Walter, et al.	
Cypress Log Cabin		215 Lake Front Dr.	Built to be a mountain home. The setting at the World's Fair included a landscape with cypress fences, arbors and bridges.	Murray D. Hetherington	
Florida Tropical House		210 Lake Front Dr.	: Designed for the southern Florida tropics, the house combines the indoors and outdoors into the living space. Large open terraces and a flamingo pink paint scheme stand out.	Robert Law Weed	Modernist
House of Tomorrow		214 Lake Front Dr.	Designed as the house of the future, this house included its own airplane hangar. Glass walls offered views from every angle and so taxed the experimental air conditioning system that the cooling system failed.	Walter Scholer, George Fred Keck, et al.	European modernism
Wieboldt-Rostone House		208 Lake Front Dr.	: Framed in steel and clad with an artificial stone called Rostone (limestone, shale and alkali). Its Rostone exterior was billed as never needing repairs, but it only lasted until the 1950s.	Walter Scholer	

== Significance ==
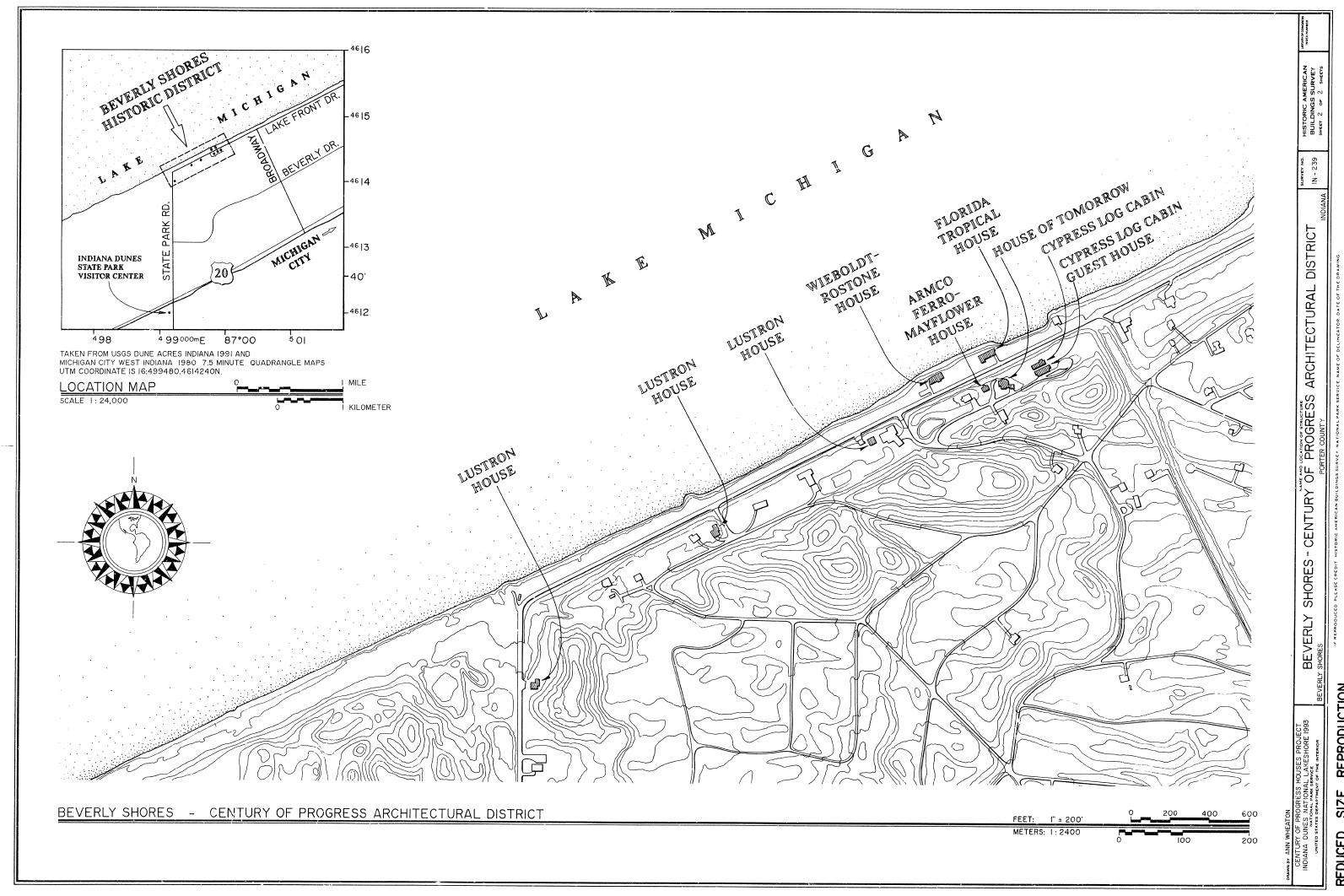
Historic American Buildings Survey

The Beverly Shores Century of Progress Architectural District encompasses houses from the 1933–34 Chicago Century of Progress Exposition that comprised a "portion of an exhibit known as the Home and Industrial Arts Group. Many of these structures were innovative and displayed engineering and construction technologies that have become an integral part of modern residential architecture."

In hosting the 1893 Columbian Exposition, Chicago made the classicism of the French Beaux Arts tradition popular with an American public coming from the Victorian architectural periods. This trend dominated American architecture during the first part of the twentieth century. Forty years later, Chicago's Century of Progress Exposition was the national showcase for new directions in American architecture, which again followed a European precedent, the 1925 Paris Exposition.

== Current status ==
Four of the five houses have been restored; the House of Tomorrow awaits restoration. One day a year, the public is allowed access to the five homes.

== See also ==
- National Register of Historic Places listings in Indiana
