= Design for Leaving =

- Title card
- Directed by: Robert McKimson
- Story by: Tedd Pierce
- Starring: Mel Blanc; Arthur Q. Bryan
- Music by: Carl Stalling
- Animation by: Phil DeLara; Charles McKimson; Rod Scribner; Herman Cohen
- Layouts by: Bob Givens
- Backgrounds by: Richard H. Thomas
- Color process: Technicolor
- Production company: Warner Bros. Cartoons
- Distributed by: Warner Bros. Pictures
- Release date: March 27, 1954
- Running time: 6:38
- Language: English

Design for Leaving is a 1954 Warner Bros. Looney Tunes theatrical animated short directed by Robert McKimson. The cartoon was released on March 27, 1954 and stars Daffy Duck and Elmer Fudd. The title is a parody of the Design for Living House, House No. 4 in the Homes of Tomorrow Exhibition at the Century of Progress, the 1933 World's Fair in Chicago.

== Plot ==
Daffy Duck is a persuasive salesman from the Acme Future-Antic Push-Button Home of Tomorrow Household Appliance Company, Inc. He barges into Elmer Fudd's home offering a free trial of modern household appliances. Daffy buys a bus ticket for Duluth, Minnesota against his will. Upon Elmer's immediate departure, Daffy lets in Acme employees to remodel Elmer's residence.

Upon Elmer's return, he finds his house transformed into a chaotic maze of malfunctioning gadgets, as well as some that are archaic, such as a garbage disposal that gets rid of everything (revealed to be a pig). Daffy invites Elmer to try some buttons for himself, but stops him when Elmer sees a red button standing out from the other white buttons, warning the red button is very specific. Despite Elmer's protests, Daffy continues to demonstrate the absurdity of the automated home, leading to comedic disasters like wallpaper removal, window bricking or a robotic fireman that responds to all high temperatures (including a lit cigar or the heat emanating from Elmer's enraged head). Elmer finally snaps and purchases a machine to carry Daffy off his property, kicking him all the way.

In a twist of fate, Elmer says to himself he will see what the red button does, which is revealed to be "in case of tidal wave", triggering a mechanism that elevates his house into the air. Daffy, now the victim of Elmer's revenge, flies by in a helicopter saying for a small price he will install a "blue button to get you down".

== Production notes ==
Design for Leaving reflects on the traditional door-to-door sales approach reminiscent of the "Yankee Peddler" era, as well as the contemporary direct-selling methods used by companies like Kirby Company vacuum cleaners and Fuller brushes. The film juxtaposes this with the post-World War II trend towards automation and modernization in U.S. homes. Acme's innovations, while two decades ahead of the 1933 Homes of Tomorrow Exhibition, predate The Jetsons (1962) by a decade with its depiction of robot maids and household gadgetry.

== Home media ==
DVD – Looney Tunes Super Stars' Daffy Duck: Frustrated Fowl (widescreen)
