= George Keck =

George Keck may refer to:

- George Fred Keck, American architect
- George Anthony Legh Keck, British MP
