= Tristan Meinecke =

American artist, architect and musician

- Born: 1916; Atchison, Kansas
- Died: 2004 (aged 87–88); Chicago, Illinois
- Education: University of Michigan
- Known for: Painting, sculpture, architectural design, music
- Movement: Abstract Expressionism, Surrealism

Tristan Meinecke (1916–2004) was an American artist, architect and musician who spent most of his life and career in Chicago. He was married to television and radio actress Angel Casey. His widely varied body of work explored abstract expressionism, cubism and Surrealism, and included the invention of the split-level painting technique. In collaboration with architect Robert Bruce Tague, Meinecke built and rehabilitated many properties in and around Lincoln Park, Chicago.

== Life and education ==
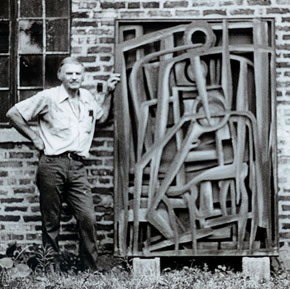
Tristan Meinecke with his work entitled "Dancer" circa 1978.

Born in Atchison, Kansas in 1916, Meinecke's family moved to Ann Arbor, Michigan when he was seven years old. Both parents were classical musicians. His father, Bruno Meinecke, was an accomplished scholar and a classics professor at the University of Michigan, "'but not,' Meinecke says, 'a good parent'". In the midst of a tense home life, Tristan nonetheless showed talent in both visual art and music. After attending the University of Michigan for four years, when he was just a few credit hours short of earning a bachelor's degree, he relocated to Chicago in 1942. There, Tristan Meinecke met and wooed Lorraine Johnson, better known as television and radio actress Angel Casey. They were wed in 1947, had two sons, eight grandchildren and remained married for the rest of their lives.

== Career ==
Meinecke's endeavors were numerous, and included poems and essays and at least one short story. However, the majority of his creative efforts fell into three categories: visual arts (including painting and sculpture), architecture and music.

=== Visual arts ===
As a toddler, Meinecke would patiently await the arrival of the weekly coal delivery cart in order to sketch it.

While still at the University of Michigan, several of Meinecke's watercolors caught the eye of then-Art Institute director Daniel Catton Rich, and one was included in the Art Institute of Chicago's Twenty-First International Exhibition of Watercolors in 1942. He was one of four University of Michigan students selected by Professor Jean Paul Slusser to complete a mural in what is now the Jean-Paul Slusser art gallery, depicting the four seasons.

By 1955, Meinecke had already abandoned the watercolor medium and developed his own abstract style: a creative use of mixed media and intentional exploration beyond the boundaries of conventional composition, which Fred Sweet, then-curator of American painting at the Art Institute, praised as "very strong and powerful and dynamic". That year, one of his mixed-media compositions was included in the Art Institute's Chicago and Vicinity Show., which brought him further into the public eye. He returned to the Chicago and Vicinity show the following year. John Corbett (writer) would later describe the split-level form as follows:

One of the innovative aspects of the split-level is it had a solution to a basic problem, which had to do with how you create a sense of depth in a painting without resorting to conventional perspective techniques. How could you have a painting that felt like there was a sense of dimension at least in a cubist way? Split-level introduces literal dimensionality to paintings ... They have a real sense of depth; you can look through it.

In 1957, Meinecke's split-level work "Heterogeneous Icon" achieved notoriety in the Art Institute's 'No-Jury' exhibition at Navy Pier: an article in The New Republic described it as "the only painting in the show that pushes back the frontiers of art". In an interview for a local newspaper, the artist explained that the construction "symbolizes much that is primitive and much that is sophisticated about man and his development."

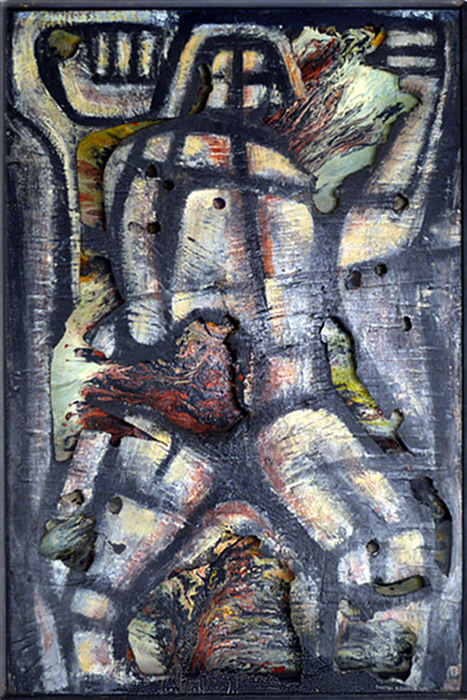
Photo of Tristan Meinecke's split-level construction "Heterogeneous Icon."

After that, he was invited to the 1958 No-Jury Exhibition and another Chicago and Vicinity show in 1959. He continued to exhibit in Chicago, including with the Renaissance Society, as well as in Michigan.

In 1975, a chance encounter with Meinecke's son brought Chicago Surrealists Penelope and Franklin Rosemont into the artist's studio. This serendipitous meeting resulted in a lifelong friendship, and incidentally Meinecke's inclusion in the Chicago Surrealist Group's 1976 exhibition, entitled "Marvelous Freedom - Vigilance of Desire".

Meinecke continued to paint until 2000, when carpal tunnel syndrome forced him to put down his brush. "Heterogeneous Icons", his last show while still living, was co-curated by John Corbett (writer) and experimental musician Hal Rammel, and held at the Art Institute's 1926 gallery in 2003.

Exhibitions curated by his sons in 2014, a decade after his death, offered many works which had never previously been made available to the public.

=== Architecture ===
In the early 60s, Meinecke turned an interest in architectural design into more practical study at the suggestion of his wife, and began to design buildings. Since he was entirely self-taught, Meinecke needed a licensed architect to sign off on the plans he created, and an acquaintance got him in touch with former Keck associate Robert Bruce Tague.

For about a decade, from the late 60s through the late 70s, under the name Meinecke Studio, they designed and built condominiums, individual homes and commercial structures comprising "hundreds of units" in contemporary styles.

=== Music ===
Meinecke developed an interest in jazz at the age of 12, which led him to start collecting records. When his father gave him a clarinet as a gift at the age of 19, he took a few lessons to learn basic fingerings, then immediately began to play by ear and to improvise. Between 1932 and 1943 he home-recorded a series of acetates with a "slinky sound and bottomless trove of melodic ideas". Later, after moving to Chicago, Meinecke would study composition under American Five composer John J. Becker. Of one of Meinecke's works, Dr. Becker said it was "exceedingly good, and likewise exceedingly difficult to perform, and that might be his greatest stumbling block - the difficulty to perform". He also played professionally around Chicago during the 40s.

== Artistic philosophy ==
According to John Corbett, "People who knew him expected him to become a star. He didn't, because he had to take a job, and because of his own cantankerous personality, and because of his own restlessness, which meant that he didn't make the same kind of work over and over again--whereas [gallery owners] wanted him to keep painting one way". Meinecke's work elicited mixed reactions from both critics and the public. He was praised as "an ardent experimenter with new materials, stretching the painting medium to extra dimensions". One of his larger split-level works, Prophecy was described as a "crowd-stopper." A beat reporter who attended the 1957 No-Jury show singled out one of his constructions as "imposing" but went on to say "It is almost all black. He was born in 1916, and should know better".

Whether the constriction of authority manifested as an academic system of rules for how to create, or as a social system of patronage and approval for determining which works of art were deemed valuable, Meinecke engaged in "a conscious rebellion" and chose to reject such systems:

"Above all I wanted to do away with 'good composition.' I aimed at breaking down form. I changed the shape of the work and quit relying on frames. I aspired to total hysteria... Above all I stayed away from the 'Art World.' It was too narrow, too phony. I rarely went to exhibit openings. I insulted everybody: gallery owners, museum curators, would-be buyers of my own work." ~Tristan Meinecke, 1981

From a creative standpoint he preferred music to painting, saying that "music is a better art". However, he chose painting in part because it was more individualistic: "you need a hundred men or at least four to play your music. In painting you don't have that problem".

Though he did not self-identify as a Surrealist, in part because the movement was political as well as artistic, he had great respect for it, saying Surrealism had "a profoundly democratic tendency". In turn, the very iconoclastic attitude which alienated him from others endeared him to them:

"Meinecke's basic equipment as an artist has included large quantities of refusal--refusal to obey idiotic rules, or to submit to senile traditions, or to follow commercial fashions. An irreconcilable enemy of banality, he has always steered clear of the cultural/political 'middle of the road'" ~ Franklin Rosemont, 2003

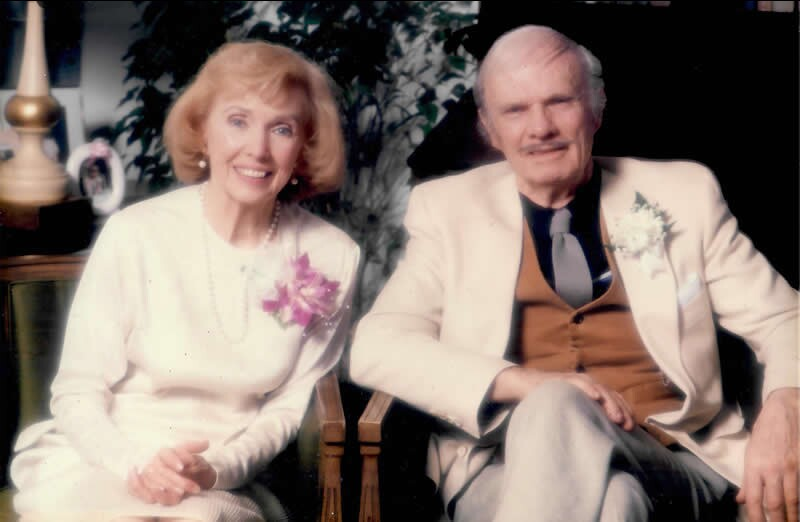
Tristan Meinecke and Lorraine "Angel Casey" Meinecke were married for 50 years until Tristan's death in 2004.

However, in musician Hal Rammel's estimation, Meinecke's desire to eschew politics does not mean his work cannot be interpreted politically:

Rammel, an artist who was a Chicago surrealist, makes the case that Meinecke's art is political just the same. "The heart of the surrealist act is directed toward freeing yourself, freeing your mind, to open up toward other realities," he says. "In those other realms there are answers to the problems of our lives and living together. The political conflict is not just against exterior tyranny but also against our interior tyrannies."

But he was not an "enemy of banality" simply because it was banal. Instead, he had a very specific vision of the direction in which American culture was headed:

"you will all go screaming and howling and spinning into the horrible eternity of continuous entertainment, madly grasping at dizzily whirling three-foot red letters which still spell security and truth to your frenzied flock." ~Tristan Meinecke, 1946

Throughout Meinecke's life, he never deviated from this philosophy of artistic rebellion.
