= Armco-Ferro House =

- U.S. Historic district – Contributing property
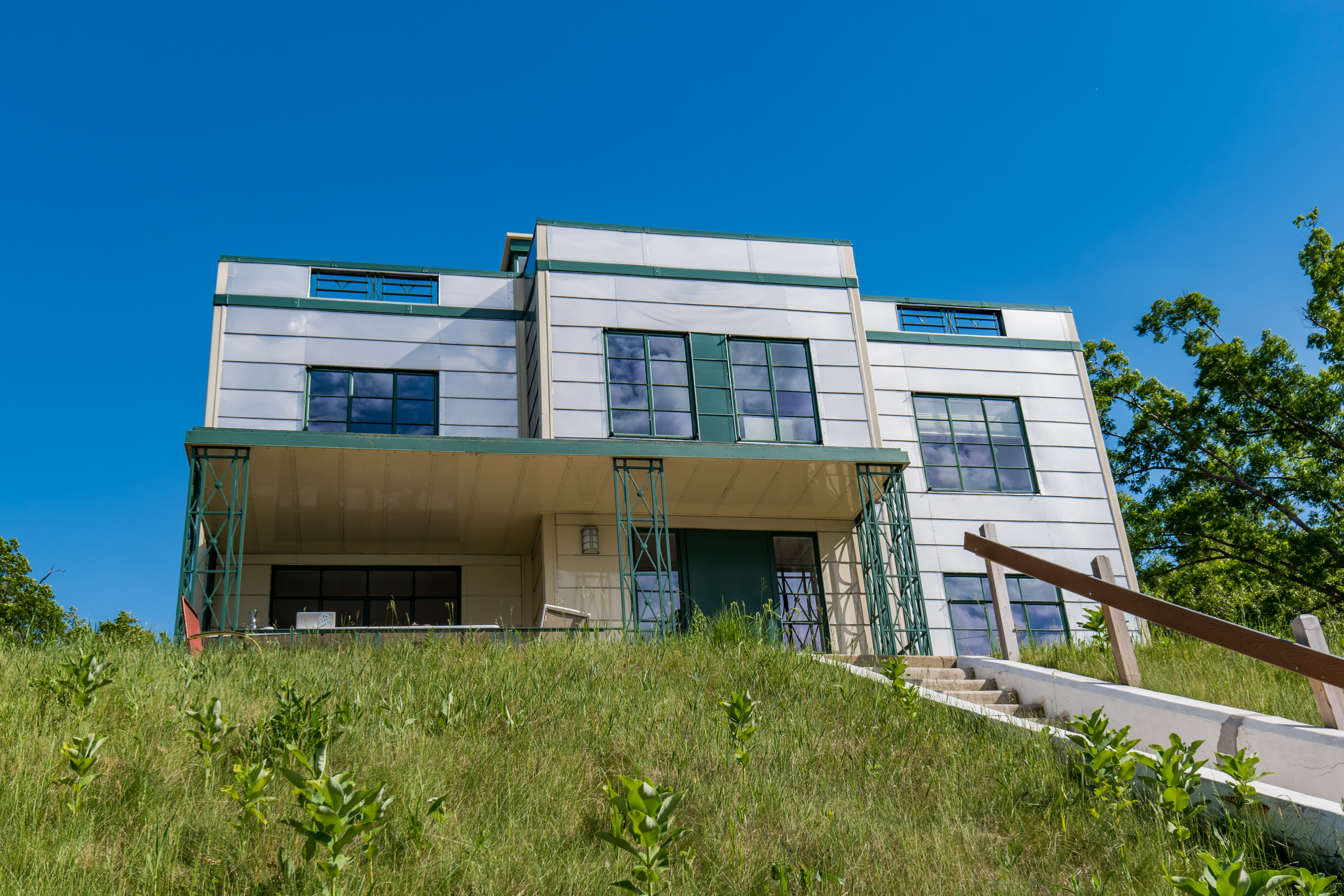
- Built by the American Rolling Mill Company, Middletown Ohio, the Armco-Ferro House was effectively the first of a production model than a prototype.
- Interactive map of the house (marked in red) among the others in the district
- Location: 212 Lake Front Dr., Beverly Shores, Indiana
- Coordinates: 41°41′3″N 87°0′6″W
- Built: 1933
- Architect: Scholer, Walter; Et al.
- Part of: Beverly Shores-Century of Progress Architectural District (ID86001472)
- Added to NRHP: June 30, 1986

The Armco-Ferro House, in the Century of Progress Architectural District in Beverly Shores, Indiana, was originally constructed for the 1933 Century of Progress Exposition in Chicago. "The ... Exposition opened in May of 1933 directed by the theme of science and its role in industrial advancement. Within the Home and Industrial Arts Group were model houses, which featured modern materials, building methods and innovative home appliances, including the Armco-Ferro-Mayflower, Wieboldt-Rostone and Florida Tropical houses, and the House of Tomorrow. All utilized new techniques of design, construction and prefabrication in an attempt to bring the out-of-date housing industry in line with more efficient manufacturing practices such as those used by the auto industry." The Home and Industrial Arts Group was the most successful venue of the Exposition. The Armco-Ferro House was designed by Robert Smith Jr. of Cleveland, Ohio. It is the only remaining example from the exposition that met the Fair Committee's design criteria; a house that could be mass-produced and was affordable for an American family of modest means.

From research completed by the Historic American Buildings Survey (HABS): The Ferro Enamel Corporation, one of the two major sponsors for the ... house, was formed in 1930 by a merger between the Ferro Enameling Company and the Ferro Enamel and Supply Co. The idea of using porcelain enamel for residential construction was introduced by Bob Weaver, president of the newly formed company. Shortly after the merger, Charles Bacon Rowley, architect, designed a four-person house with Ferro-Enamel shingles that the company erected in Cleveland, Ohio, in July 1932.31 Despite the innovative use of ferroenamel as a cladding material, the house was built using conventional wood construction. The first porcelain-enameled frameless steel house was completed ... in South Euclid, Ohio ... Like the Armco-Ferro house, this house was designed by Robert Smith, Jr., and was built by Insulated Steel Corporation; ... In 1932, the American Rolling Mill Company (Armco) ... built a second porcelainenameled frameless steel house ... using Robert Smith, Jr. as architect. The Ferro Enamel Corporation and the Insulated Steel Construction Company collaborated with Armco, thus setting the stage for the partnership that made the Century of Progress home possible.

== Spatial Organizations ==
=== External ===
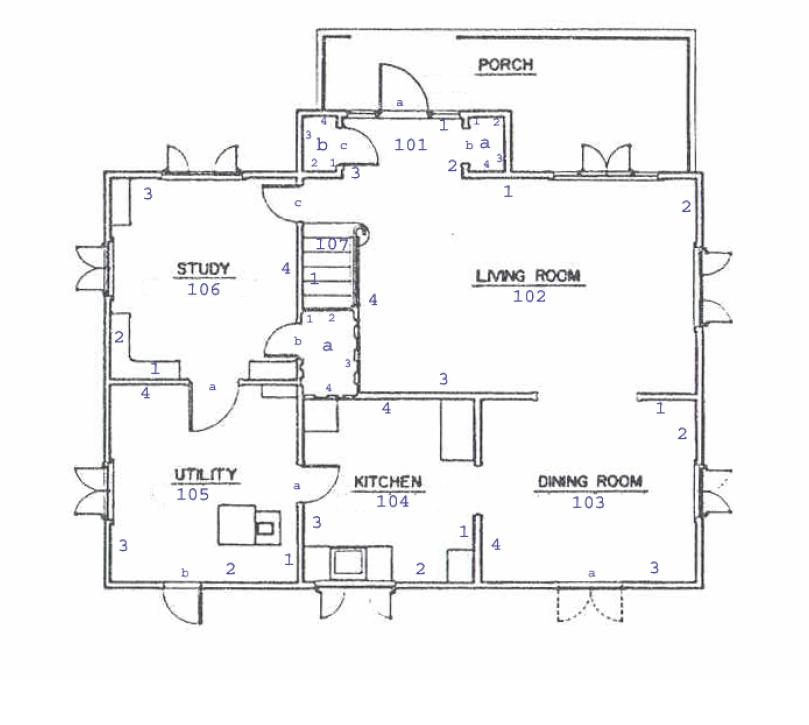
First Floor Plan of the Armco-Ferro House

The open lawn around the house has grown in over the years since it was placed on the rise overlooking Lake Michigan. The landscape does not match that of the community at the World's Fair site.

This seemingly frameless house boasts a revolutionary construction system: corrugated steel panels that are bolted together. This system resembles a typical cardboard box. The corrugated panels are clad with porcelain-enameled steel panels produced by the Ferro Enamel Corporation. This construction system later provided the inspiration for the post World War II prefabricated housing developed by the Lustron Corporation.

=== Internal ===
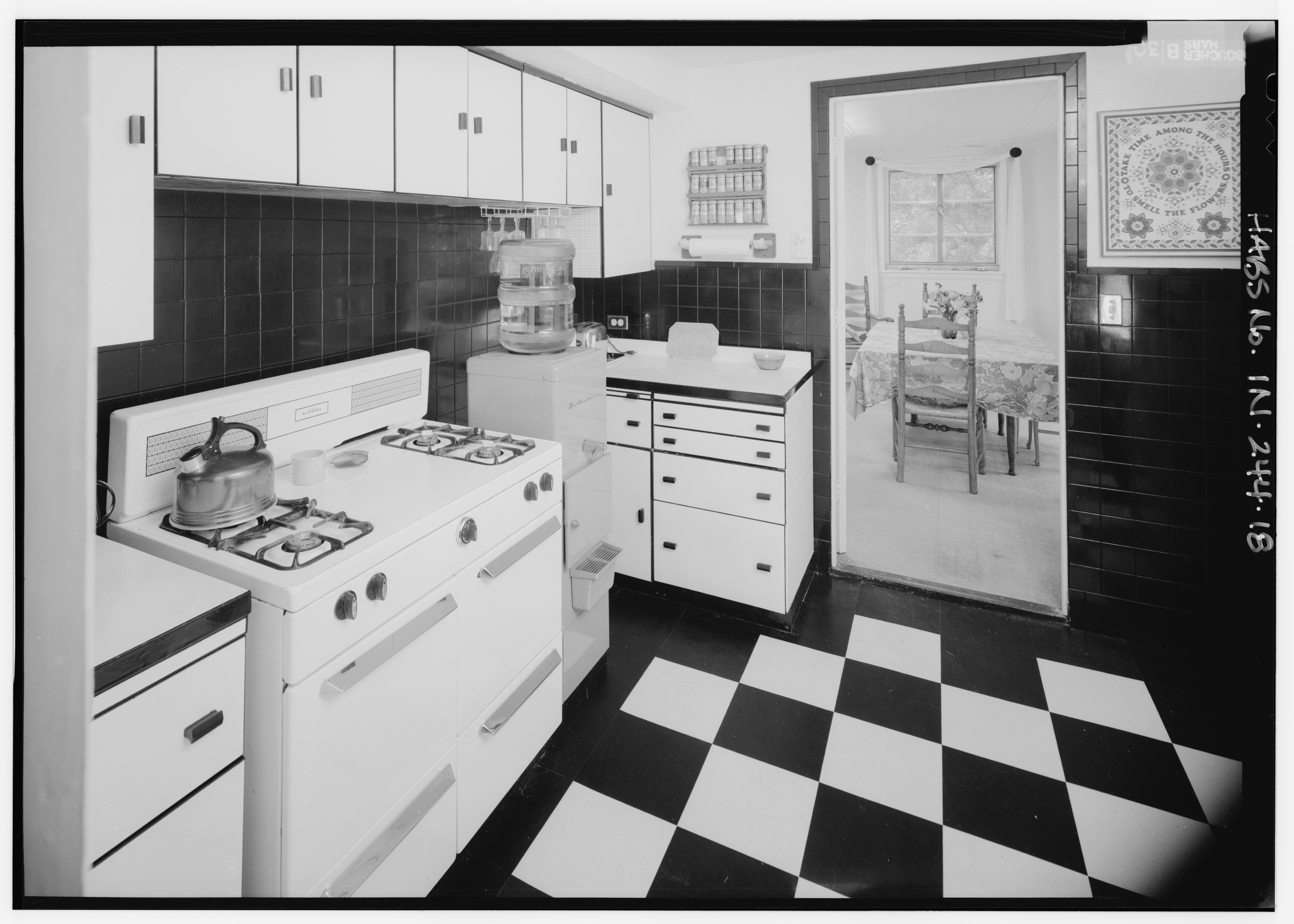
Kitchen, South Rear Center Room, looking in the Dining Room from the west

Armco-Ferro House is based on a traditional four-square. There are four rooms on the first floor and four rooms on the second. The four-square allows for cross ventilation in all weather and all seasons. The original garage was open for the 1933 fair season and enclosed for the 1934 fair season, becoming a study. A porch was added the second year The living room of the Armco-Ferro House as it was decorated for the 1934 fair season. The furnishings for this season were very traditional – the spaces were not cluttered with too many pieces as in 1933. The dining room of the Armco-Ferro House as it was decorated for the 1934 fair season. The furnishings were very traditional, as was the use of a wood wainscot detail. Note however that the lighting did not change from that used in 1933. The kitchen of the Armco-Ferro House as it was decorated for the 1934 fair season; looking toward the laundry room. The only changes that can be discerned from the 1933 season are the use of a Masonite "tile" wainscot, the "picture frame" pattern in the linoleum, and the cabinet/appliance layout. The dining room of the Armco-Ferro House as it was originally decorated for the 1933 fair season. The decorators thought "outside the box" when designing this room. Rather than using it solely as the dining space they created two use areas. The dining table was set on an outside wall under a window, and in the opposite corner they placed a card table for recreational purposes. The boy's room of the Armco-Ferro House as it was originally decorated for the 1933 fair season. The furnishings for this season were very modern with rectilinear lines and details. Two unusual pieces of furniture for the time period included the hanging bunk bed, and the bookcase, which doubled as the stair for the bed.

The house is a contributing property to the Century of Progress Architectural District.

== Restoration efforts ==
Restoration efforts on the Armco-Ferro House were started in 1997, with the Indiana Dunes National Lakeshore and the Historic Landmarks Foundation of Indiana searching for potential leasees to restore the building.

As of October 2011, the restoration of the home is near completion. The home is open one day annually in the fall for tours, along with the other Century of Progress homes nearby (all except one having been restored or restoration in-progress).

== See also ==
- Indiana Dunes National Park
- List of Registered Historic Places in Indiana

== Bibliography ==
- Maria F. Ali, The Century of Progress Documentation Project (Washington, D.C.: Historic American Buildings Survey, Department of the Interior, 1994), HABS No. IN-239. Appendix A.
- Maria F. Ali, Armco-Ferro-Mayflower House Documentation Project (Washington, D.C.: Historic American Buildings Survey, Department of the Interior, 1994), HABS No. IN-244. Appendix B.
- National Register Nomination, National Register of Historic Places (National Park Service, Department of the Interior, October 1985), Appendix C.
- Cultural Resource files, Resource Management Division, Indiana Dunes National Lakeshore. Janice Slupski, 17 West Service Avenue: An Illustration of Dunes Area Recreational Development, (Indiana Dunes National Lakeshore, Department of the Interior, 1997).
- Department of Agriculture, Soil Conservation Service, and Purdue University, Agricultural Experiment Station, Porter County Soil Survey, n.d.
- A Century of Progress Homes and Furnishings, Dorothy Raley, Editor, 1934.
- The Official Pictures of A Century of Progress Exposition Chicago, 1933.
- Joseph C. Folsom, "How to Enjoy This Week at the Fair Week Ending Sept. 30", Official World's Fair Weekly, 1933.
- "Frameless Steel House At A Century of Progress", 1933.
- "The Metal Home", 1933. An unnamed brochure produced by the Insulated Steel Construction Company, 1933.
- "Steel House Will Be Built Here; Work Started Near Poasttown", The Middletown, Ohio, News Journal, July 30, 1933.
- "To Open Frameless Steel House", The Dayton Daily News, 1933.
