= Cypress Log Cabin =

Historic house in Indiana, United States

- U.S. Historic district – Contributing property
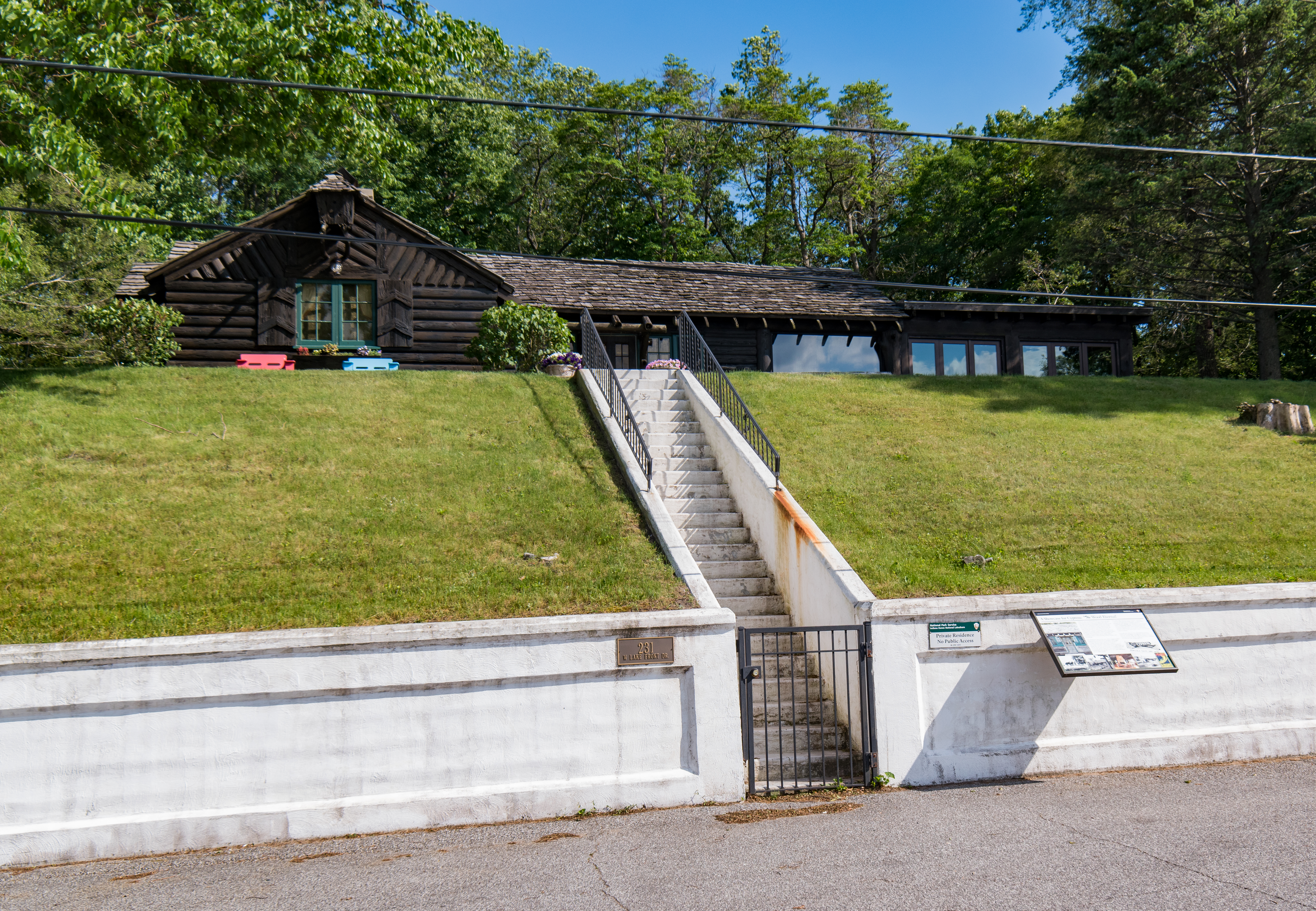
- Interactive map of the house (marked in red) among the others in the district
- Location: 215 Lake Front Dr., Beverly Shores, Indiana
- Coordinates: 41°41′03″N 87°00′06″W
- Built: 1933
- Architect: Murray D. Hetherington
- Architectural style: Log home
- Part of: Beverly Shores-Century of Progress Architectural District (ID86001472)
- Added to NRHP: June 30, 1986

The Cypress Log Cabin and the Cypress Guest House are historic buildings in the Century of Progress Architectural District in Beverly Shores, Indiana. The houses were sponsored by Southern Cypress Manufacturer's Association of Jacksonville, Florida. The Cypress Cabin was purchased by the Zimmerman Estate represented by Zimmerman, Saxe and MacBride, Chicago architects. It was planned to move the house to St. Joseph, Michigan, where it was to be a summer home near the Bolton exhibit building of the 1893 Columbian Exposition. The move included the Cabin, Guest House and other landscape elements. That move never happened and Robert Bartlett trucked the Cabin and Guest House to Beverly Shores. Bartlett owned the property until 1942, when sold it to Ida J. Osterburg. The house changed owners several times, until it was purchased by the National Park Service in October 1970, becoming part of Indiana Dunes National Lakeshore.

The Cypress Log Cabin was built for the 1933–34 exhibition house to demonstrate the many uses of cypress. The house was built using traditional materials rather than the experimental materials used elsewhere in the exhibition. During both seasons of the fair, Mr. and Mrs. B.R. Ellis from the Southern Cypress Association lived in the ell of the house.

== Century of Progress ==
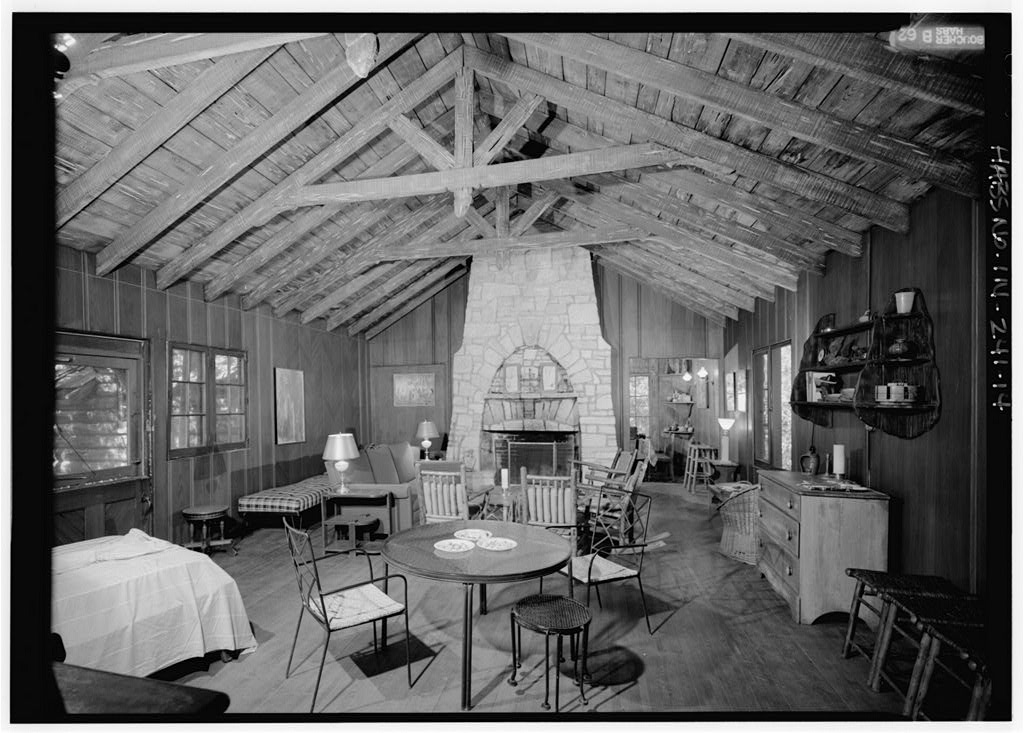
Interior of the Cypress Log House

The Guest House was added to the Home and Industrial Arts Group for the 1934 exposition year. It was used as a display building showing historic uses of cypress, such as a 150-year-old Seminole Indian canoe, 200-year-old Spanish prison stock and a 120-year-old French water main from New Orleans . The Guest House was one of several changes in the Home and Industrial Arts Group landscape for the 1934 season.

== Move to Indiana ==
In the winter and spring of 1934, sixteen buildings barged and trucked to Robert Bartlett's subdivision at Beverly Shores, Indiana. In an attempt to capitalize on the fairs success, Bartlett reestablished a small exhibition of model houses along Lake Front Drive in Beverly Shores. Depression-era America had responded the Chicago Century of Progress exhibition and Bartlett hoped to transfer that positive interest to his development. The Cypress Log Cabin was moved to Lake Front Drive in Beverly Shores along with four other houses from the Home and Industrial Arts Group. The exhibition site had been landscaped by the James W. Owen Nurseries. Robert Bartlett planned "to reconstruct and landscape them for sale exactly as they were on the Fair grounds." Bartlett neither replicated the fair landscape nor did adapted individual themes for each house. The by grouping the house along Lake Front Drive, Bartlett managed to recreate a sense of an "exhibition group". Three of the exhibition homes were lined up on the south side of Lake Front atop a dune. A retaining wall was created to run the length of Lake Front from the Armco-Ferro House, past the House of Tomorrow to the Cypress Log Cabin. A flight of twenty-seven stairs in front of each house leads to the yard in front of each house with a walkway connecting all three.

== Log Cabin ==
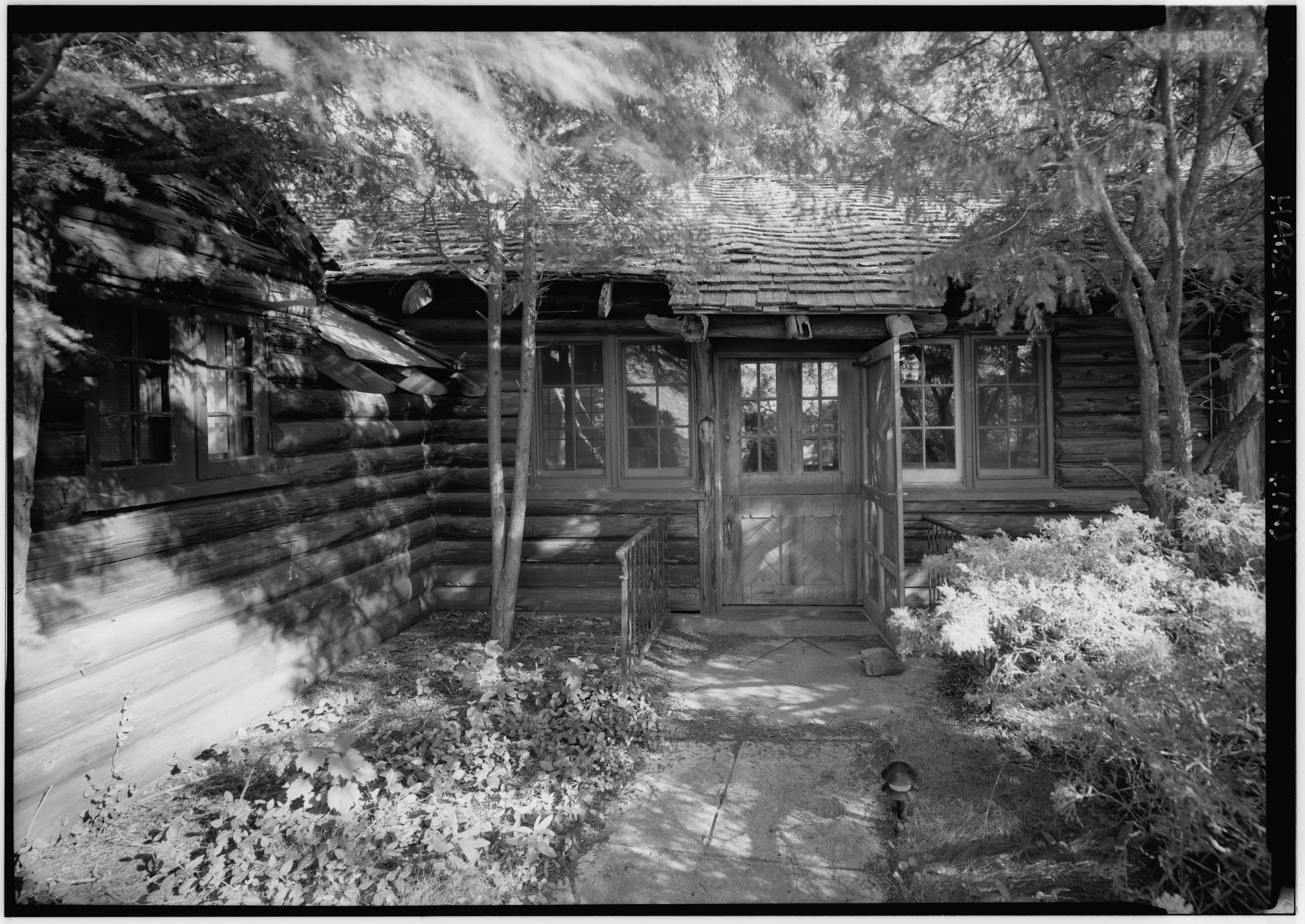
Cypress Log Cabin

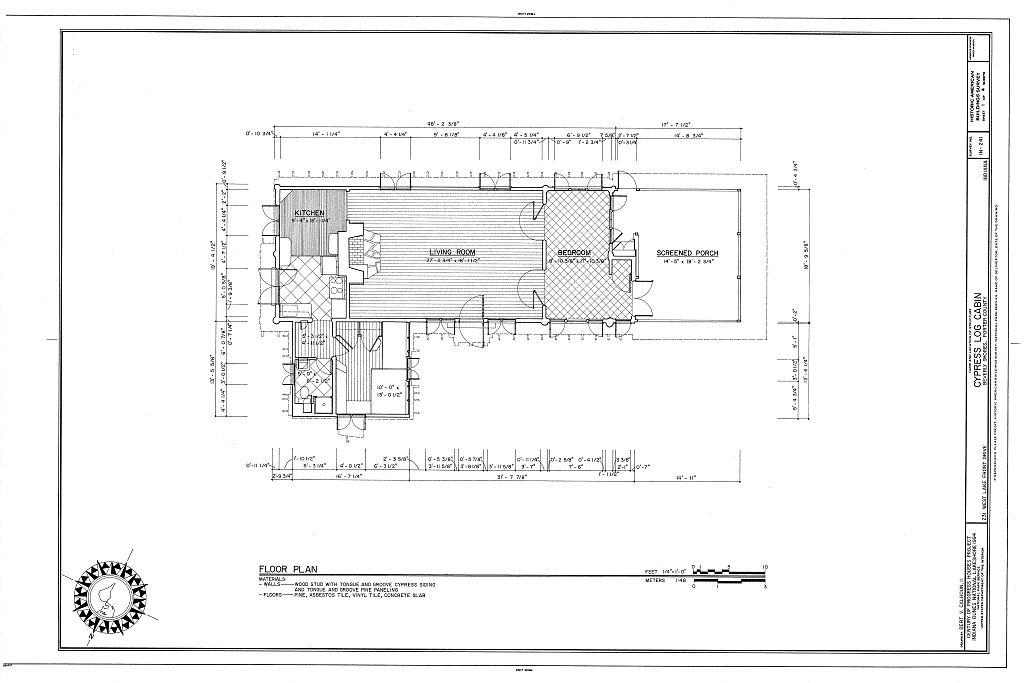
Floor Plan

The house is an intentionally rustic mountain cabin set in a picturesque, asymmetrical landscape. In contrast to many of the model houses that featured modern building materials, the Cypress House was intended to exhibit the diverse possibilities for building with a traditional material. The house was meant to be a display space rather than a model home arranged to look as if someone lived there. Ironically, the Cypress House was the only building in the Home and Industrial Arts group that actually served as a home; the ell was occupied for both seasons by the house's sponsor and his wife. The Cypress House had a complex landscape scheme formed from an assemblage of fences, arbors, bridges and decorated cypress knees used to create a mountain lodge atmosphere. For the 1933 season of the fair, the only major outbuilding was a greenhouse built by Lord & Burnham. For the 1934 season, the Southern Cypress Association applied for additional land in the former Dahlia Garden to construct a second greenhouse by Lord & Burnham's main competitor, the American Moninger Company. This request was denied and most of the Dahlia Garden land was given to the Kohler company. The Lord & Burnham greenhouse was removed for the 1934 season and a new building was built that extended slightly into the Dahlia Garden. This may have been the Guest House, then functioning as a cypress workshop.

== Guest House ==
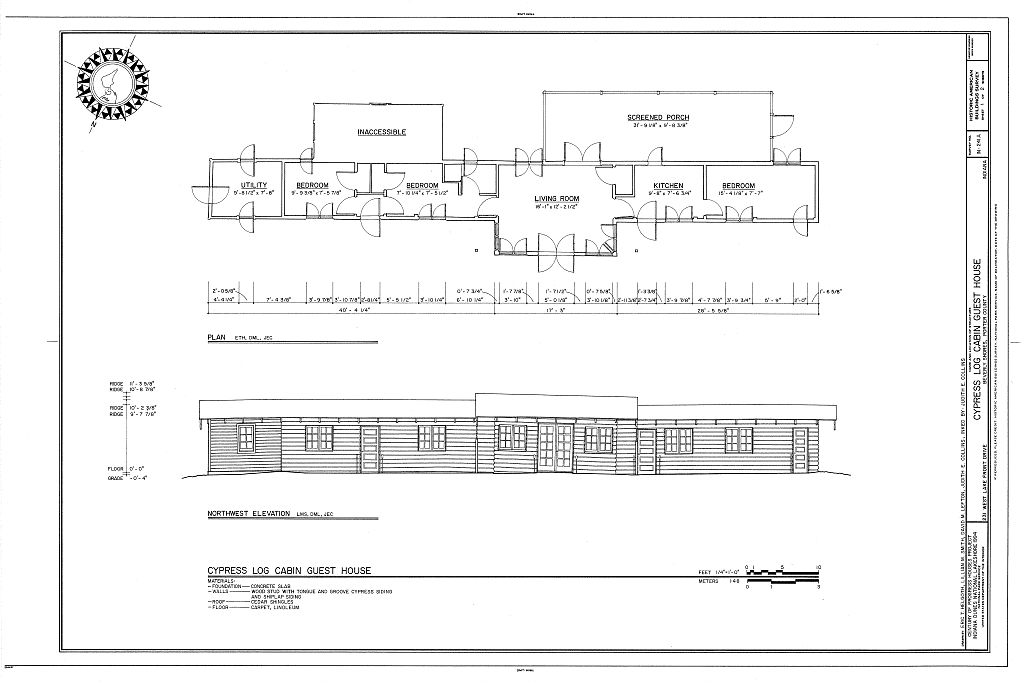
Guest House floor plan

An outbuilding of the Cypress Log Cabin, the Guest House was originally a part of the Home and Industrial Arts Group at the 1933–34 Chicago Century of Progress Exposition. The structure was moved to Beverly Shores, Indiana by Robert Bartlett, a real-estate developer who purchased the houses after the close of the fair

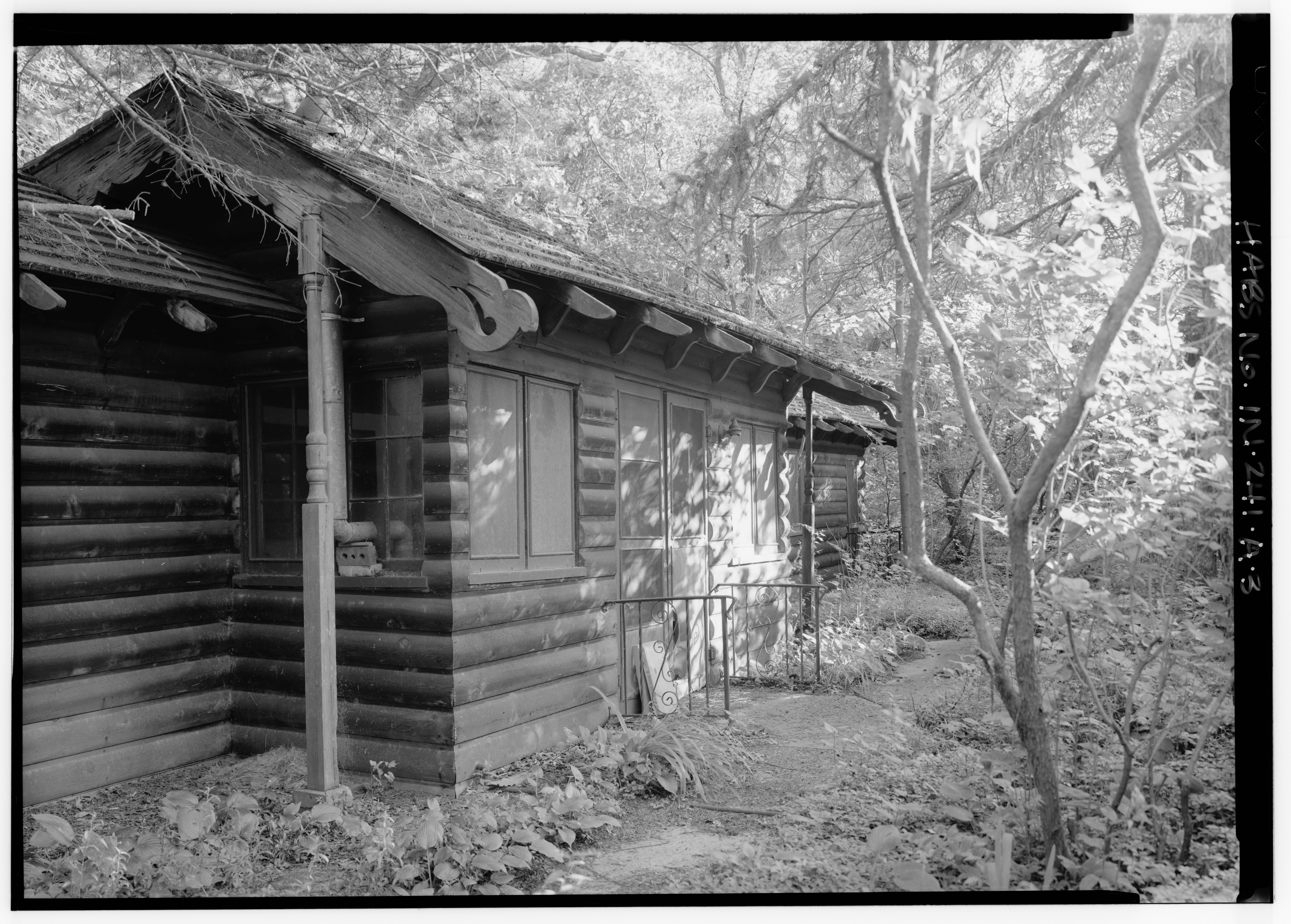
Cypress Log Cabin – Guest House

=== Exterior ===
Characterized as a rustic style mountain lodge, the house is 87 by 18 feet (26.5 by 5.5 m) on concrete footings. The walls are made of pecky cypress log siding. The building is of frame construction with log and ship-lap siding. Porches were added when the buildings were moved to Beverly Shores.

=== Interior ===
The house is a long narrow, single room width rectangle. The living spaces are arranged in a symmetrical pattern around of a central living space. Entering the central living space from the north, the kitchen is to the right or west with a bedroom beyond it. To the left or east are two bedrooms and a bathroom. At the far west end of the structure is a utility room accessible only from the outside

== Restoration efforts ==
Restoration efforts on the Cyprus Log Cabin were started in 1997. The home is now fully restored and occupied by long-term renters who obtained a 30-year lease from the park service in exchange for restoration and maintenance of the home.

== Bibliography ==
- "A Century of Progress Paradox: Whose meat and whose Poison?", Architectural Forum 61; November 1934; pgs 374–379.
- Boyce, Robert; Keck & Kock; New York; Princeton Architectural Press, Inc.; 1993
- Cahan, Cathy and Richard; "The Lost City of the Depression." Chicago History, Winter 1976–77; pg 233–242
- "Catalogue of A Century of Progress Exposition." Introduction p 1–5; Special Collections, Richard J. Daley Library, University of Illinois at Chicago; Chicago
- "Cypress Cabin at World's Fair Sold for Home." Chicago Daily News; November 3, 1934
- Horrigan, Brian; "The Home of Tomorrow, 1927–1946"' Imaging Tomorrow, ed. Corn, Joseph J.; pg 137–163' Cambridge, MA; MIT Press; 1986
- Lohy, Lenox R.; Fair Management: the Story of A Century of Progress Exposition; Chicago; Cuneo Press, Inc., 1952
- Pecky Cypress: Its Nature and Uses."; Jacksonville, FL: Miller Press, 1933. Chicago Century of Press Exposition; Special Collection, Richard J. Daley Library, University of Illinois at Chicago, Chicago.
- Raley, Doroty, Ed.; A Century of Progress: Homes and Furnishings; Chicago; M.A. Ring Company, 1`934
