= Robert Bruce Tague =

American architect

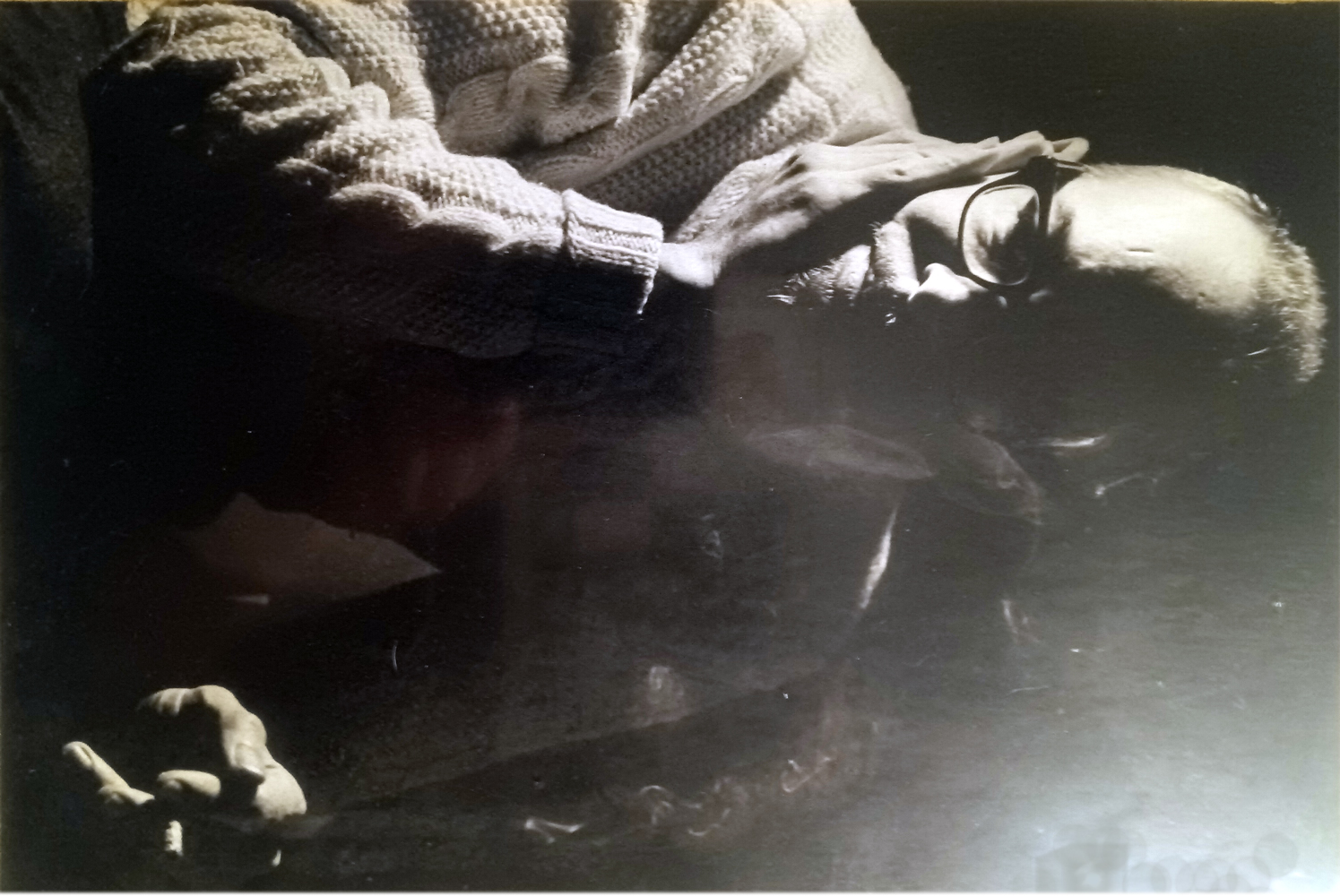
- c. 1976
- Born: 1910 or 1911; Chicago, Illinois, U.S.
- Died: December 17, 1984 (aged 73); Chicago, Illinois, U.S.
- Occupation: Architect

Robert Bruce Tague (1910/1911–1984) was an American modernist architect and abstract artist who lived in Chicago, Illinois.

== Education and military service ==
Tague studied architecture at the Armour Institute of Technology, receiving a Bachelor of Architecture in 1933 and a master's in 1935. At the New Bauhaus in Chicago, he taught architecture and drafting. Both institutions later became part of the Illinois Institute of Technology.

He served in the United States Army from 1944 to 1946.

== Career ==
=== Architecture ===
After seeing George Fred Keck's buildings at the Century of Progress exposition, Tague sought him out as an advisor for his master's thesis. Tague began doing design work for the senior architect, immediately, even before completing his thesis. While employed there as the chief draftsman, he collaborated on buildings with Keck. He was commissioned by Philip Johnson to design a stage for Father Charles Coughlin's Labor Day rally in Chicago on behalf of Union Party presidential candidate William Lemke. He also worked with Ralph Rapson on an entry for the competition to design Ecuador's Legislative Palace. Later, as an associate of Crombie Taylor, he helped to redesign the Auditorium Building.

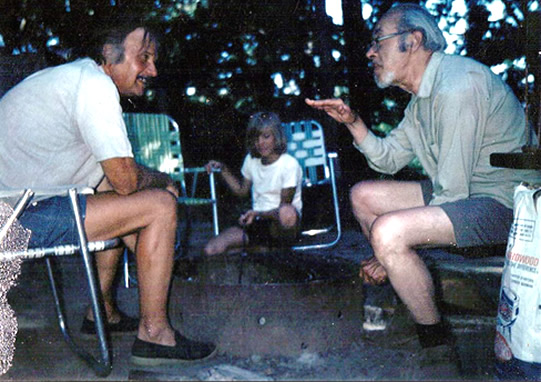
Robert Bruce Tague (right) and Tristan Meinecke (left), with one of Tristan Meinecke's sons in 1976

Together with Tristan Meinecke, he was a partner in the firm Meinecke Studio which built "hundreds of units" in Chicago.

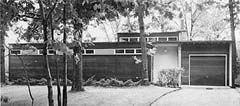
Robert Bruce Tague's Frueh House, built 1949, demolished 2006

Tague's house for the Frueh family in Highland Park was his most notable building; a local architectural historian found that it had a good case for inclusion on the National Register of Historic Places. However, despite the efforts of a conservation group, the property was demolished and a new building erected in 2006. In 1952, he and Crombie Taylor collaborated on the design of a single-family home for Irving Nuger in Elmwood Park. This design was among those included in Quality Budget Houses: A Treasury of Architect-Designed Houses from $5,000 to $20,000 by Katherine Morrow Ford and Thomas L. Creighton, published in 1954.

=== Visual art ===
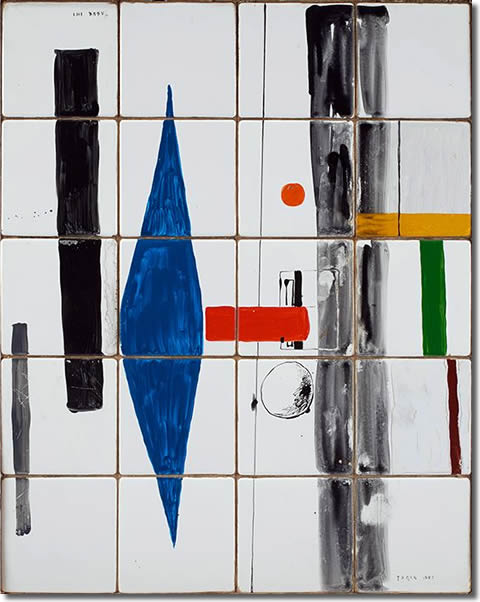
An abstract painting by Robert Bruce Tague

Tague was also an abstract artist. He was known for oil, watercolor and mixed media collage in a sophisticated, modernist style.

== Death ==
Tague died at Lakeside Veterans Medical Center in Chicago on December 17, 1984.
