= Grand Concourse Apartments =

- U.S. National Register of Historic Places
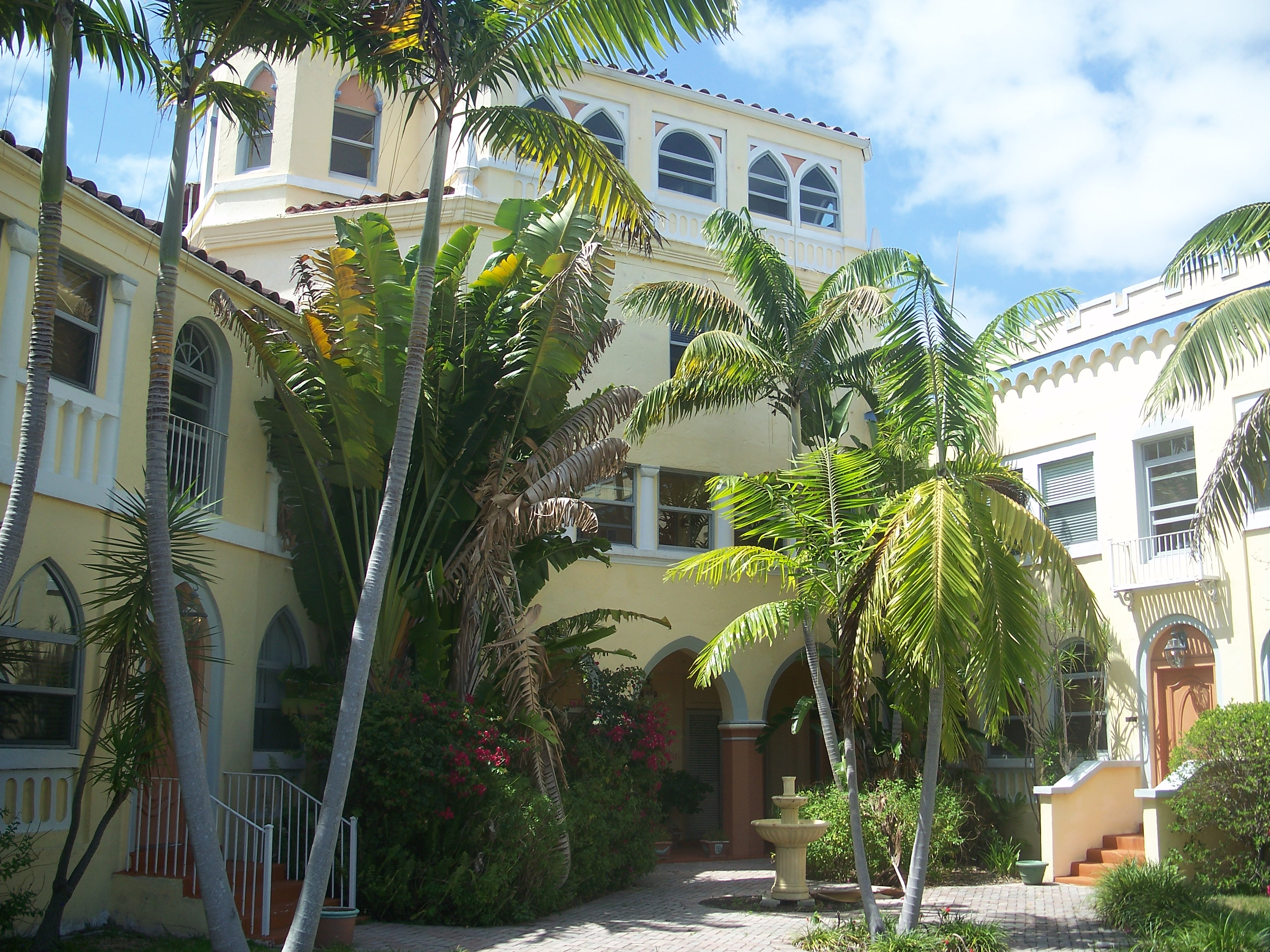
- Grand Concourse Apartments in 2011

- Location within Miami Location within Florida Location within the United States
- Location: 421 Grand Concourse, Miami Shores, Florida
- Coordinates: 25°51′50″N 80°11′21″W
- Area: less than one acre
- Built: 1926
- Architect: Robert L. Weed; Godard & Sydow
- Architectural style: Late 19th and 20th Century Revivals, Mediterranean revival
- NRHP reference No.: 85003060
- Added to NRHP: December 2, 1985

The Grand Concourse Apartments is a historic site in Miami Shores, Florida built in 1926. It is located at 421 Grand Concourse. On December 2, 1985, it was added to the U.S. National Register of Historic Places. It was designed by Robert L. Weed.

== References and external links ==
- Dade County listings at National Register of Historic Places
- Dade County listings at Florida's Office of Cultural and Historical Programs
