= Angel Casey =

American television and radio actress

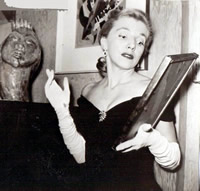
- Angel Casey
- Born: Lorraine Shartle Johnson; 1919; Middletown, OH, U.S.
- Died: 2007 (aged 87–88); Chicago, IL, U.S.
- Occupations: Actress, Children's show host
- Spouse: Tristan Meinecke (m. 1947-2004)

Lorraine Meinecke (née Johnson), known professionally as Angel Casey, was an American television and radio actress.

== Early life ==
She was born in Middleton, Ohio, and attended the University of Cincinnati – College-Conservatory of Music.

== Television and radio career ==
Angel Casey began her acting career in the mid-1940s. One of the earliest extant photos from this period is an advertisement for caviar, published in Life Magazine's August 1945 issue. A television commercial in which she appeared drew favorable press in 1946. She went on to act in numerous television and radio dramas in the late 1940s and early 1950s.

Along with Bill Anson, she was the co-host of the WBKB show “Telequizicalls,” which first aired in 1945. It was modeled after Anson's “Telephone Quiz” radio call-in show, and “purport[ed] to be the first audience participation show in visual radio.”

In addition to regular acting roles, she made guest appearances with Martin and Lewis, Spike Jones and Dave Garroway. In 1955, she was one of the celebrity guests at Chicago's State Street Christmas Parade.

“The Playhouse” aired Monday through Friday at 9am on WBKB's channel 7. Her co-star, puppeteer Bruce Newton, describes her leadership as follows: "I don't think Angel ever missed a day either. We all contributed copy for the show, crafts, visuals, scripts, and guest suggestions. We did this from the debut on December 28, 1953, until the show went off the air on August 31, 1956." Documents from her estate indicate that she created the concept for her puppet sidekick, Sir J. Worthington Wiggle, and successfully pitched it to producers.

== Later career and family life ==
Angel Casey remained a Chicago star in her later career, despite taking on smaller roles.

She married Chicago artist and architect Tristan Meinecke. In 1958 the Tribune's Lifestyle section featured a two-page story on the Meineckes' glamorous lifestyle, in which Angel was the primary subject of the article. Another article from 1958 profiles the Meineckes as a household in which both parents have careers. She acted as business manager and promoter for her husband.

After her death, her family alleged that "The Play House" may have been cancelled because she attempted to integrate it.

She had two sons, Bradford and David Scott, and eight grandchildren.
