= Dr. Robert Hohf House =

Historic house in Illinois, United States

- U.S. National Register of Historic Places
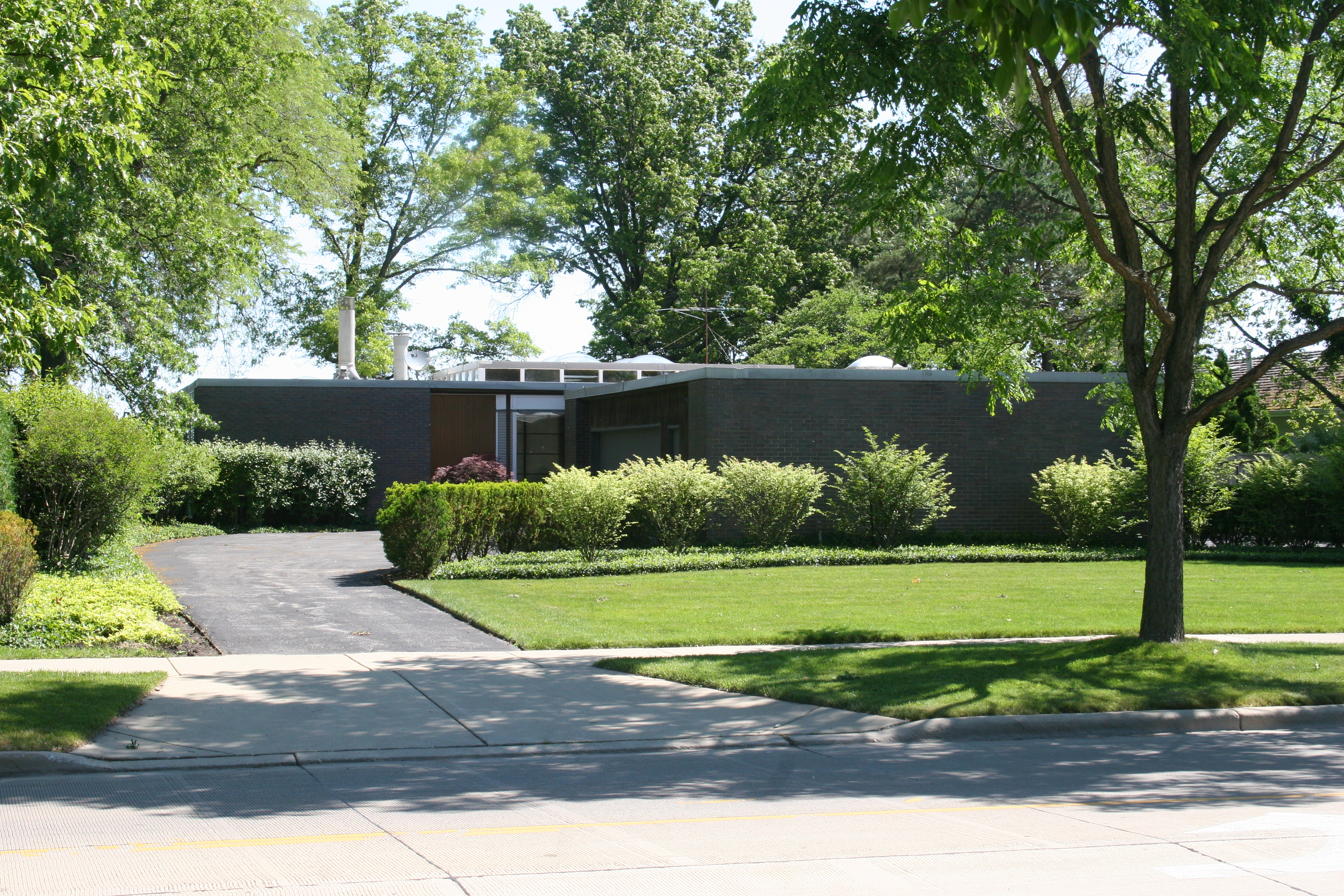
- Hohf House in 2012

- Location within Illinois Location within the United States
- Nearest city: Kenilworth, Illinois
- Coordinates: 42°5′29″N 87°42′23″W
- Area: less than one acre
- Built: 1957
- Built by: Wieboldt Construction Co.
- Architect: Keck & Keck, Robert Hohf
- Architectural style: International Style
- NRHP reference No.: 08001166
- Added to NRHP: December 12, 2008

The Dr. Robert Hohf House is an International Style residence near Kenilworth, Illinois, United States. Built in 1957, it was designed by George Fred Keck and William Keck, Architects, in collaboration with Evanston Hospital surgeon Dr. Robert Hohf. It is considered a particularly fine example of post-World War II architecture around Kenilworth.

== History ==
The 1950s were a period of great growth for the suburbs of Chicago, Illinois. The North Shore was the most popular destination for businessmen and other rich professionals. Dr. Robert Hohf purchased the lot at the intersection of Sheridan Road and Woodstock in 1956 from a Mr. Livingston. Hohf graduated from Northwestern University Medical School in 1948. He joined the staff of Evanston Hospital in 1952, where he eventually rose to become the head of vascular surgery. Following his retirement, Evanston Hospital dedicated their Blood Flow Laboratory in his name. Hohf was also a branch president of the American Medical Association and was president of the Chicago and Midwest Surgical Societies. Later in his life he served on the Board of Trustees for Yankton College in his birth town of Yankton, South Dakota.

Hohf had an interest in architecture; he previously helped to design several facilities at the hospital including operating rooms, a medical building, and designs for pacemakers. The Hohf House would be the first International Style building in the area; other house designs in the area were designed from various revival styles.

Keck & Keck were commissioned to build the house in collaboration with Hohf. Hohf designed the basic house plan where living areas surrounded a central atrium. Keck & Keck suggested floor to ceiling windows facing the atrium, but Hohf rejected the idea. Wallace, Atkinson & Fitzgerald, frequent collaborators of the Kecks, were tasked with landscape architecture and the Wieboldt Construction Company oversaw construction. The Kecks received a Certificate of Merit in Residential Design by the Chicago Chapter of the American Institute of Architects for their work on the Hohf House, citing its "simple open plan and the well-zoned arrangement of rooms about the interior court." On December 12, 2008, the house was recognized by the National Park Service with a listing on the National Register of Historic Places.

== Architecture ==
The Dr. Robert Hohf House is set back approximately 100 feet (30 m) from the east side of Sheridan Road. The house was placed behind the garage to increase privacy. The two-car garage is square and clad in gunmetal grey brick. The driveway is U-shaped and is accessed from the south side. The black front door is flanked with Italian bronze-toned glossy mosaic tiles in grey mortar. The entrance, 38 feet (12 m) in width, is recessed. Windows and the fascia are trimmed with white aluminum. The north and south wings extend 68 feet (21 m) and are faced with gunmetal grey brick. Each of these wings has three large window panes with louvered side panels.

The eastern wall, facing Lake Michigan, is floor-to-ceiling glass. Aluminum storm doors off the living room and den provide access to the backyard. The roof also extends 3 feet (0.91 m) past the eastern wall, supported by cedar beam columns. Although the Hohfs originally agreed to the Kecks' plan of having no rear porch, they later had one installed in the 1960s. The flat roof is made of pitch topped with gravel. It had a "cooling pool", an experiment in solar technology. It was thought that the water on the roof would decrease heat transmission through reflection and evaporation. Radiant heat flooring is provided throughout the house through a hot water system. The house is largely square-shaped and symmetrical.

Inside, the rooms surround the sunlit atrium, which features Shōji screens on the north and south walls. A 9-square-foot (0.84 m^{2}) pool, with a decorative bronze fountain designed by Thomas Hibben, is in the northwest corner. Stone tiles cover the floor. The atrium ceiling extends beyond the roofline and features cedar panels and skylights. The 15-by-20-foot (4.6 m × 6.1 m) den is on the northeast corner. Built-in storage cabinets and bookcases are found on the north and south ends of the room. Walls are paneled with cedar and the floor is tiled with the same stone as the atrium. The dining room and kitchen are along the north wall. The kitchen, east of the dining room, is 10 by 15 feet (3.0 m × 4.6 m) and features a large window extending from the countertops to the ceiling. The east wall has a wall of upper cabinets with counter space below. The wall between is wallpapered in a bright color. The ceiling is painted white and the floor is vinyl.

The living room occupies most of the space on the eastern wall facing the lake. The north wall has a soapstone fireplace with a metal frame and is otherwise covered in brick painted chalk grey. The ceiling is painted the same color. The floor is covered in carpeting. The four bedrooms are on the south end of the building. The 15-by-20-foot (4.6 m × 6.1 m) master bedroom is in the southeast corner and includes built-in cabinets and closets. A master bathroom is found on the west side. A common bathroom is just to the north, facing the atrium hall. The other bedrooms are 10 by 15 feet (3.0 m × 4.6 m). They have white painted ceilings and large windows on the south.
