= Robert Law Weed =

American architect

- Born: 1897
- Died: 1961 (aged 63–64)

Robert Law Weed (1897–1961) was an architect from Miami, Florida. He designed many Modernist buildings in Miami and abroad.

== List of works ==
=== In Miami ===
- Grand Concourse Apartments, 1926, NRHP-listed
- Miami Shores Elementary School, 1929
- Shrine Building, 1930
- Beach Theatre, 1940, with Edwin T. Reeder and Hal Pereira

=== Elsewhere ===
- Coral Gables Villages, 1925–1927, Coral Gables
- Florida Tropical House, built for the Homes of Tomorrow Exhibition during the 1933 World's Fair in Chicago, Illinois
