= Wieboldt-Rostone House =

- U.S. Historic district – Contributing property
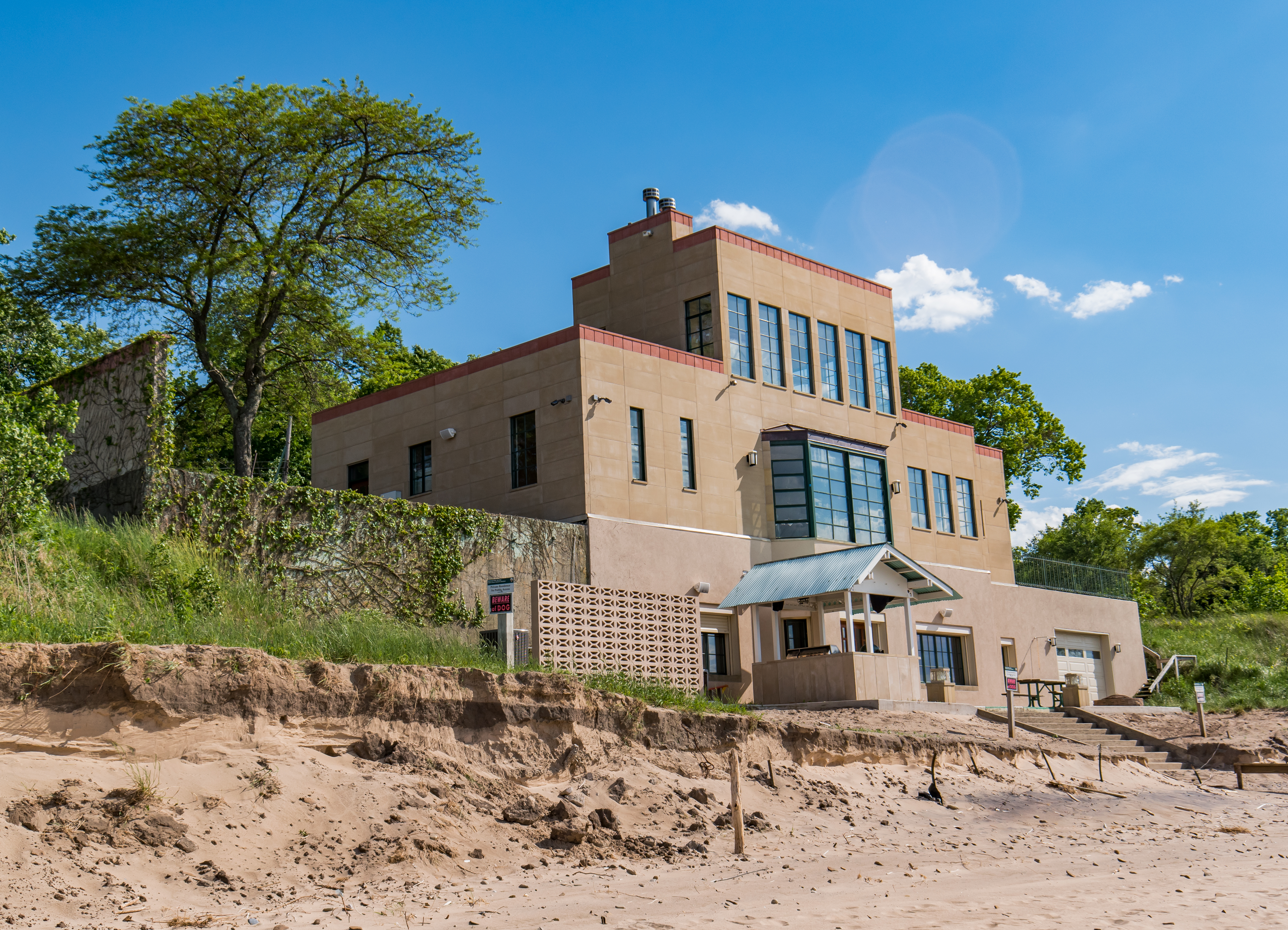
- Beachfront facade
- Interactive map of the house (marked in red) among the others in the district
- Location: 208 Lake Front Dr., Beverly Shores, Indiana
- Coordinates: 41°41′3″N 87°0′6″W
- Built: 1933
- Architect: Scholer, Walter; Et al.
- Part of: Beverly Shores-Century of Progress Architectural District (ID86001472)
- Added to NRHP: June 30, 1986

The Wieboldt-Rostone House is a historic building in the Century of Progress Architectural District in Beverly Shores, Indiana. The home was built in 1933, framed in steel, and clad with an artificial stone called Rostone (Limestone, shale and alkali). Billed as never needing repairs, it only lasted without renovations until the 1950s.

Intended to showcase a new building material of limestone waste and shale, the Rostone House was the product of Rostone, Inc., of Lafayette, Indiana, and the Indiana Bridge Company. Construction was simplified by the completion of most design and fabrication work at a factory. The panels would be precast to the correct sizes needed for a specific project. Each panel came with pre-set nuts that would be used to bolt the panel onto the steel frame. Both the interior and exterior walls were designed this way. The house was designed by Indiana architect Walter Scholer.

== History ==
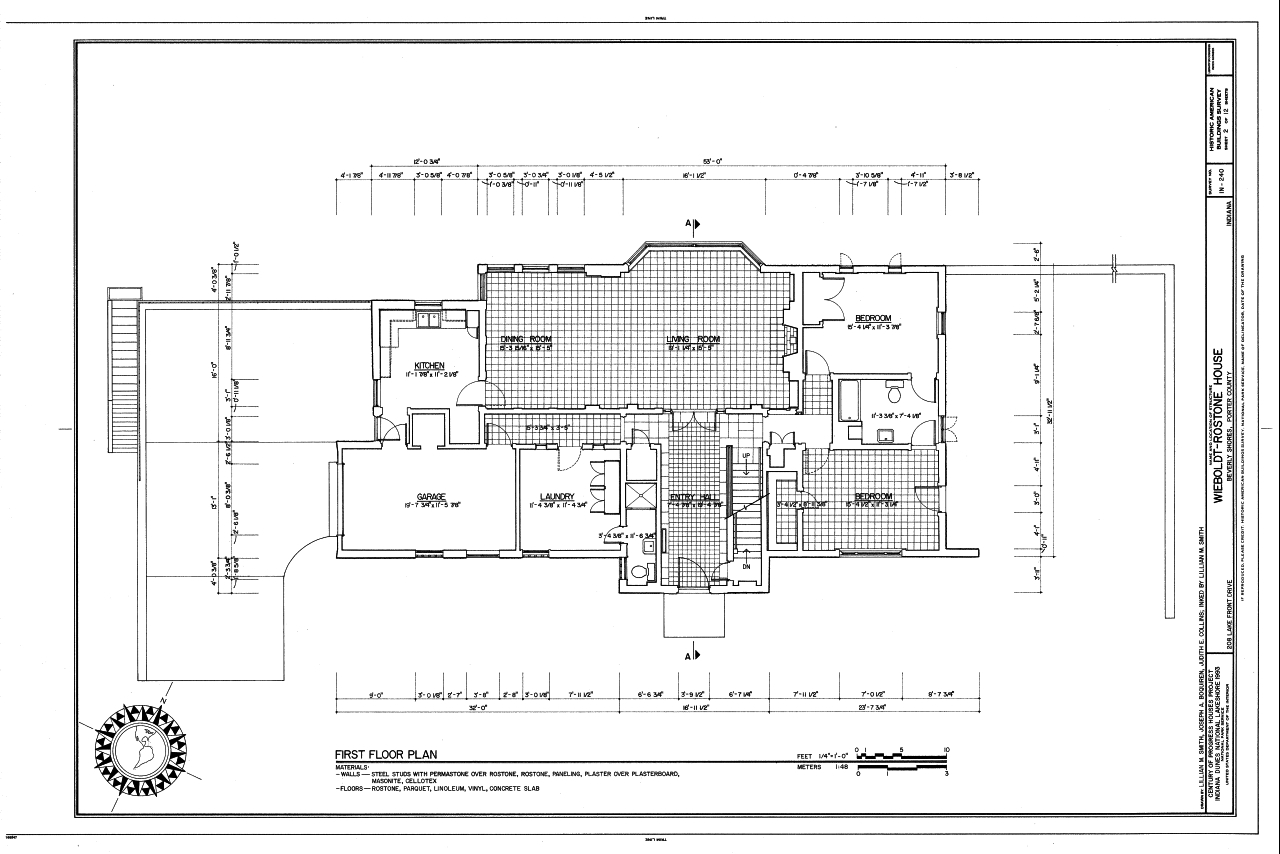
First floor, floorplan

Rostone Inc. and Indiana Bridge Co. rented Lot 7 in the Home and Industrial Arts group from the 1933 Century of Progress season for $2100. Thomas E. Smith and B.R. Graham contracted with Century of Progress for the interior decoration of the house on March 1, 1933. Failure to provide a contract, and design plan lead to the contract cancellation on July 17, 1933. Tobey Furniture Co. took over as interior decorators on June 24, 1933. Correspondence between Harrison and Smith-Graham indicated that the upstairs room, shown as a solarium in 1933 and a bedroom in 1934 was originally designed as a bedroom. Because of time constraints caused by the controversy, the room was exhibited as a solarium in 1933.

== Rostone ==
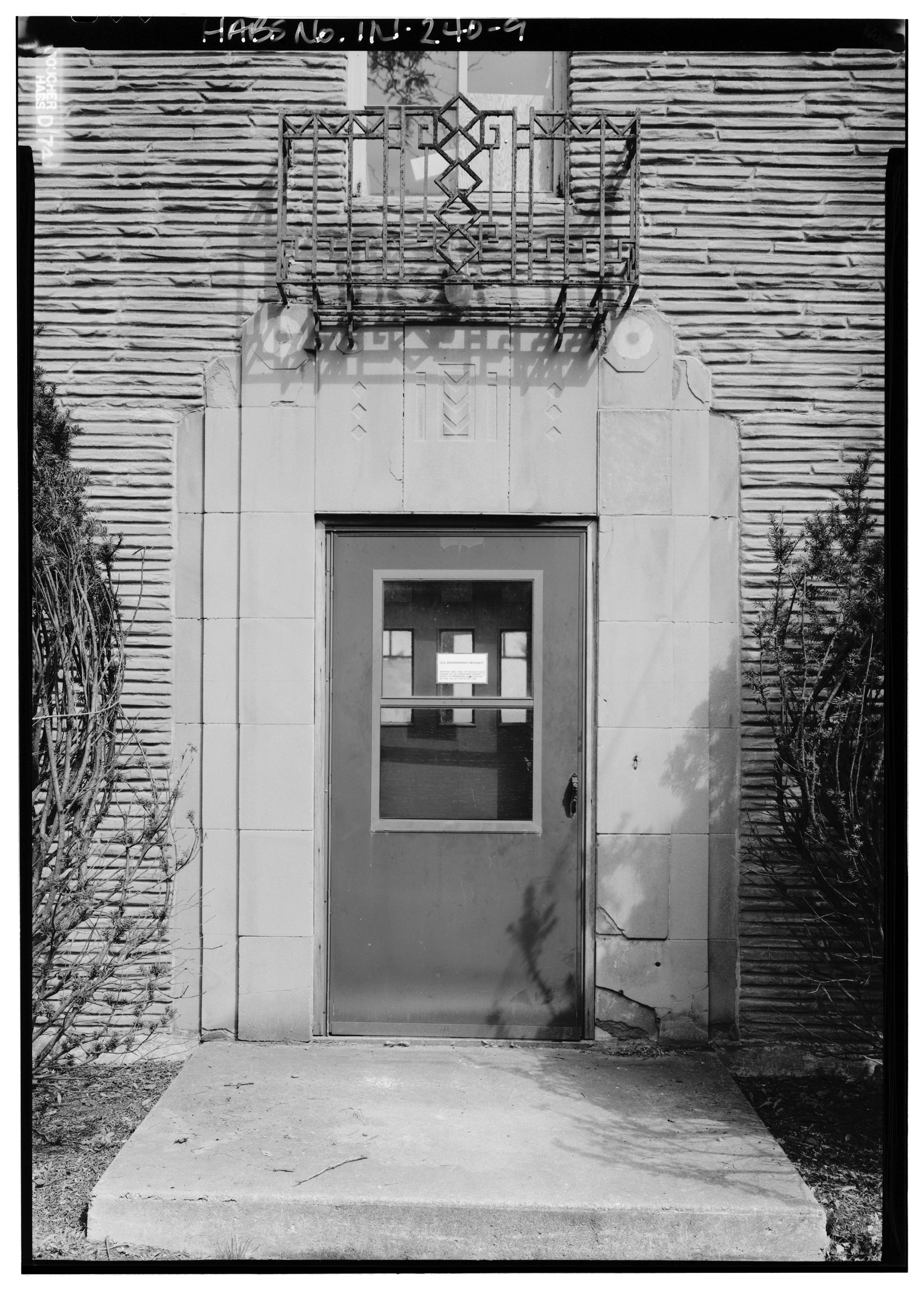
Front Entrance (only original Rostone)

It is a synthetic product composed of shale, alkaline earths, and limestone quarry waste. It has a variety of colors and can be produced in slabs, panels and other forms to exact dimensions. It was advertised as having the properties resembling limestone. The advantages to rostone was that it could be produced in any dimension and in several colors. The material was much less durable than initial tests indicated. The sheathing on the Rostone House began to fail approximately ten years after it was installed; the house was reclad with Permastone in 1950.

== Move to Beverly Shores ==
Robert Bartlett purchased the Homes of Tomorrow Exhibition houses in 1935 and hired Civil Engineers, Ltd of Chicago to move them to Beverly Shores. The Rostone House was placed on the lakefront with its expansive windows facing the lake. In the winter and spring of 1934, sixteen buildings were brought by barge and by truck from the site of the 1933-34 Century of Progress Exposition to Robert Bartlett's subdivision at Beverly Shores, Indiana. In an attempt to capitalize on the fair's success, Bartlett reestablished a small exhibition of model houses along Lake Front Drive in Beverly Shores. Understanding the importance of the fair to Chicago and to Depression-era America is crucial for comprehending the significance of the houses for Bartlett and for those who purchased land at Beverly Shores.

== Restoration efforts ==
Restoration efforts on the Wiebolt-Rostone House were started in 1997, with the Indiana Dunes National Lakeshore and the Historic Landmarks Foundation of Indiana searching for potential lessees to restore the building.

== See also ==
- Indiana Dunes National Park
- List of Registered Historic Places in Indiana

== Bibliography ==
- Century of Progress Paradox: Whose meat and whose Poison?" Architectural Forum 61 (November 1934): 374-379.
- A House of Rostone at a Century of Progress. Exhibition booklet. Chicago: Privately printed, 1933.
- Bemis, Albert Farwell. The Evolving House. Vol. 3, Cambridge, MA: MIT Press, 1936.
- Boyce, Robert. Keck & Keck. New York: Princeton Architectural Press, Inc., 1993.
- Cahan, Cathy and Richard. "The Lost City of the Depression." Chicago History (winter 1976–77): 233–242.
- "Catalogue of A Century of Progress Exposition." Introduction, p. 1-5. Special Collections, *Richard J. Daley Library, University of Illinois at Chicago, Chicago.
- Correspondence. Century of Progress Exhibition Archives. Special Collection, Richard J. Daley Library. University of Illinois at Chicago, Chicago.
- Horrigan, Brian. "The Home of Tomorrow, 1927-1945." In Imagining Tomorrow, ed. Corn, *Joseph J., 137–163. Cambridge, MA: MIT Press, 1986.
- Lohr, Lenox R. Fair Management: the Story of A Century of Progress Exposition. (Chicago: Cuneo Press, Inc.), 1952.
- Official Guide Book of the Fair. Chicago: A Century of Progress, 1933.
- Official 1934 Guide Book of the Fair. Chicago: A Century of Progress, 1934.
- Century of Progress. Special Collections, Richard J. Daley Library, University of Illinois at Chicago, Chicago.
- Raley, Dorothy, ed. A Century of Progress: Homes and Furnishings. (Chicago: M.A. Ring Company), 1934. Reservation of Use Files. Park Headquarters, Indiana Dunes National Lakeshore. Porter, IN.
- "The Modern Houses of the Century of Progress Exposition," Architectural Forum. (July 1933): 51–64.
- Walter, L. Rohe. "Look Homeward, America!" Review of Reviews and World7s Work, October 1934, 27–30.
