= Florida Tropical House =

- U.S. Historic district – Contributing property
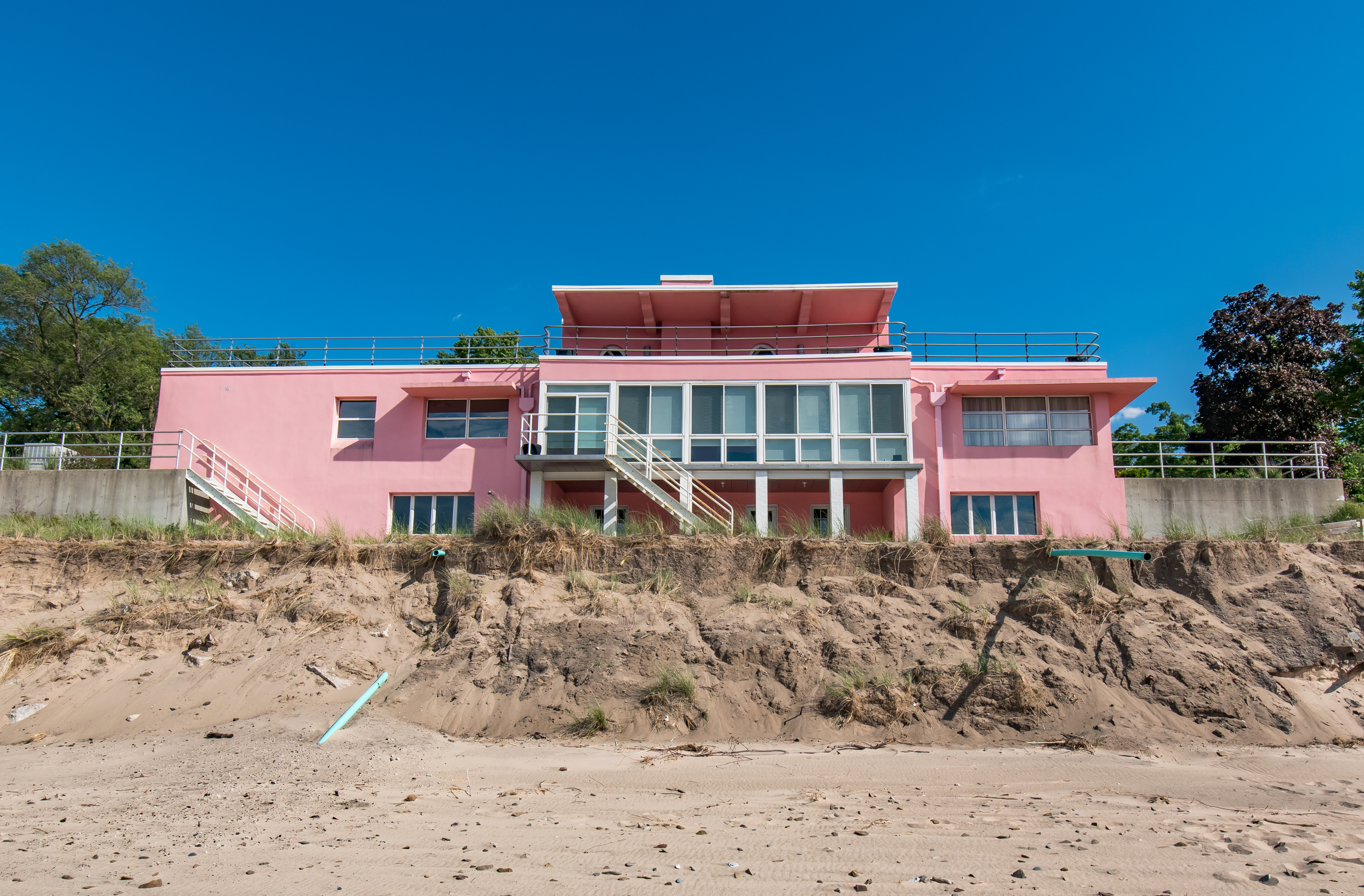
- The Florida Tropical House from the beach
- Interactive map of the house (marked in red) among the others in the district
- Location: 210 Lake Front Dr., Beverly Shores, Indiana
- Coordinates: 41°41′3″N 87°0′4″W
- Built: 1933 by Deigaard & Preston for $15,000
- Architect: Robert Law Weed
- Architectural style: Modernism
- Part of: Century of Progress Architectural District (ID86001472)
- Added to NRHP: June 30, 1986

The Florida Tropical House is a beach house on the Lake Michigan shoreline in Beverly Shores, Indiana, US. It was built in 1933 as part of the Homes of Tomorrow Exhibition at the 1933 World's Fair in nearby Chicago. It is part of the Century of Progress Architectural District, a historic district.

After years of disrepair, the house is being renovated and is subleased to a private renter who has agreed to cover the restoration costs. The house was designed so its inside and outside environments can be continuous. Its exterior was designed in the Modernist style by architect Robert Law Weed and painted a Floridian pink.

The house, with four other 1933 exhibition homes nearby, were added to the National Register of Historic Places in 1986. They are collectively known as the World's Fair Houses.

== Construction ==
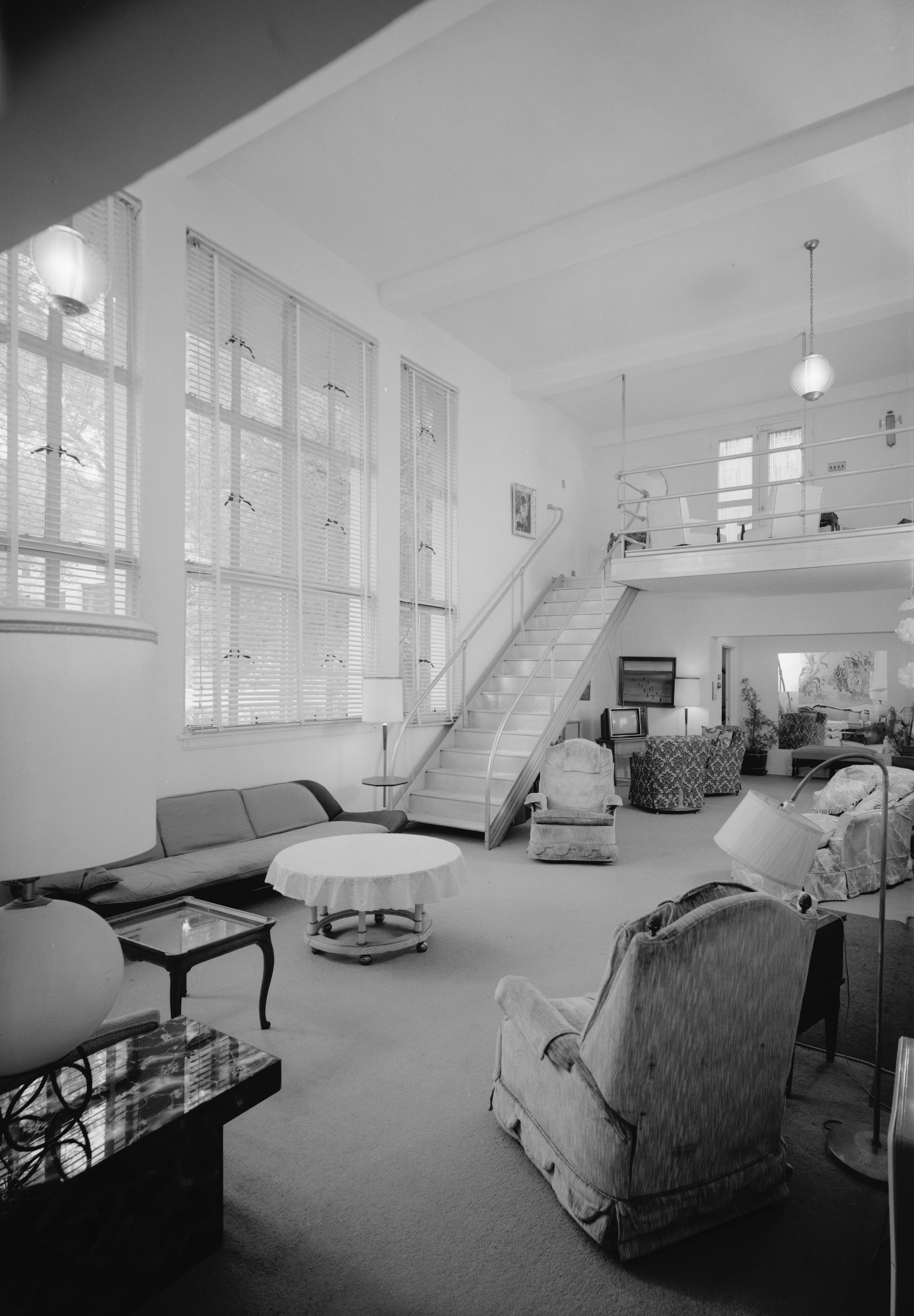
Interior, general view of center room from northeast

The Florida House (as it was called originally) was built in 1933 for the Homes of Tomorrow Exhibition of the 1933 World's Fair by the State of Florida to showcase itself and to entice tourism to the state. The construction was carried out by the Deigaard & Preston construction firm for a total of approx. $15,000.

The house was moved to its current location by real estate developer Robert Bartlett. Bartlett, who wanted to establish a resort community in the area complete with a golf course, hotel, and botanical garden, was responsible for moving six of the exhibition's homes to the area, brought to Beverly Shores by barge in 1935.

== Architecture ==
The Florida Tropical House's design was inspired by Florida's tropical climate and blends both the indoor and outdoor environments together with its use of an outdoor terrace. The building was designed in the Modernist style by Miami architect Robert Law Weed with the needs of a Florida resident in mind. This is represented by the fact that some of the original amenities had to be replaced for them to survive the area's continental climate, with near constant warm temperatures and rainy seasons.

The house itself sits atop a concrete slab, which was placed onto a basement foundation when it was moved here in 1935. The exterior is covered with a lightweight concrete stucco painted in pink. Materials used for the building included travertine, limestone, Portland cement and clay tile—all of which are native to Florida. Although it was planned to be built with poured concrete walls, the house was framed in wood in order to save money.

The house's interior was carried out by architects James S. Kuhne and Percival H. Goodman from Chicago and New York respectively. The interior, painted in shades of yellow, coral, and blue, was designed in the Modernist style—as was the rest of the house. The central part of the interior features a living and dining room connected via an aluminum staircase to an overhanging balcony with access to the terrace. The house's two bedrooms and the only bathroom, were located on the ground floor.

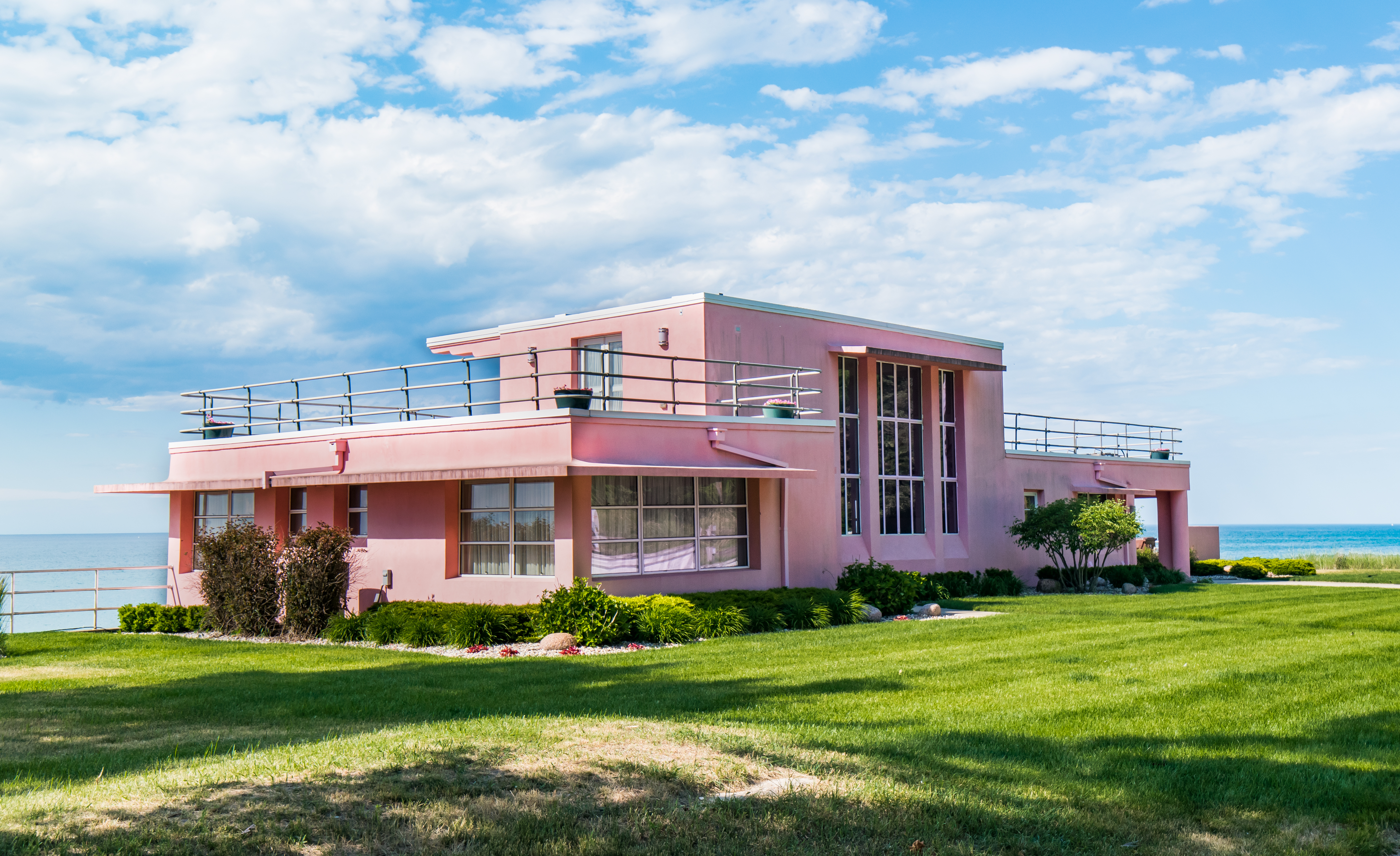
The south facade of the Florida Tropical House

The building's flat roof was modeled from that of a storm-proof deck from an ocean liner and included a loggia, deck, and recreation room. Once covered with ceramic tiles, the flooring had to be replaced and covered with roofing for it to endure the harsh mid-western winters. At some point in time, a dumbwaiter was also located on the terrace; however, it was removed shortly after the move to Beverly Shores.

== Restoration ==
Restoration efforts on the Florida Tropical House were started in 1997, with the Indiana Dunes National Lakeshore and the Historic Landmarks Foundation of Indiana searching for potential lessees to restore the building. Under the agreement, the private owner would receive a 30-year sublease, providing that they would cover all of the restoration costs, and open the home to the public at least once a year. Restoration on the home is estimated at approx. $450,000 by the current lessee William Beatty, who signed the lease agreement in 2000.

== See also ==
- Indiana Dunes National Lakeshore
- List of Registered Historic Places in Indiana
