= House of Tomorrow (Indiana) =

Historic house in Indiana, United States

- U.S. Historic district – Contributing property
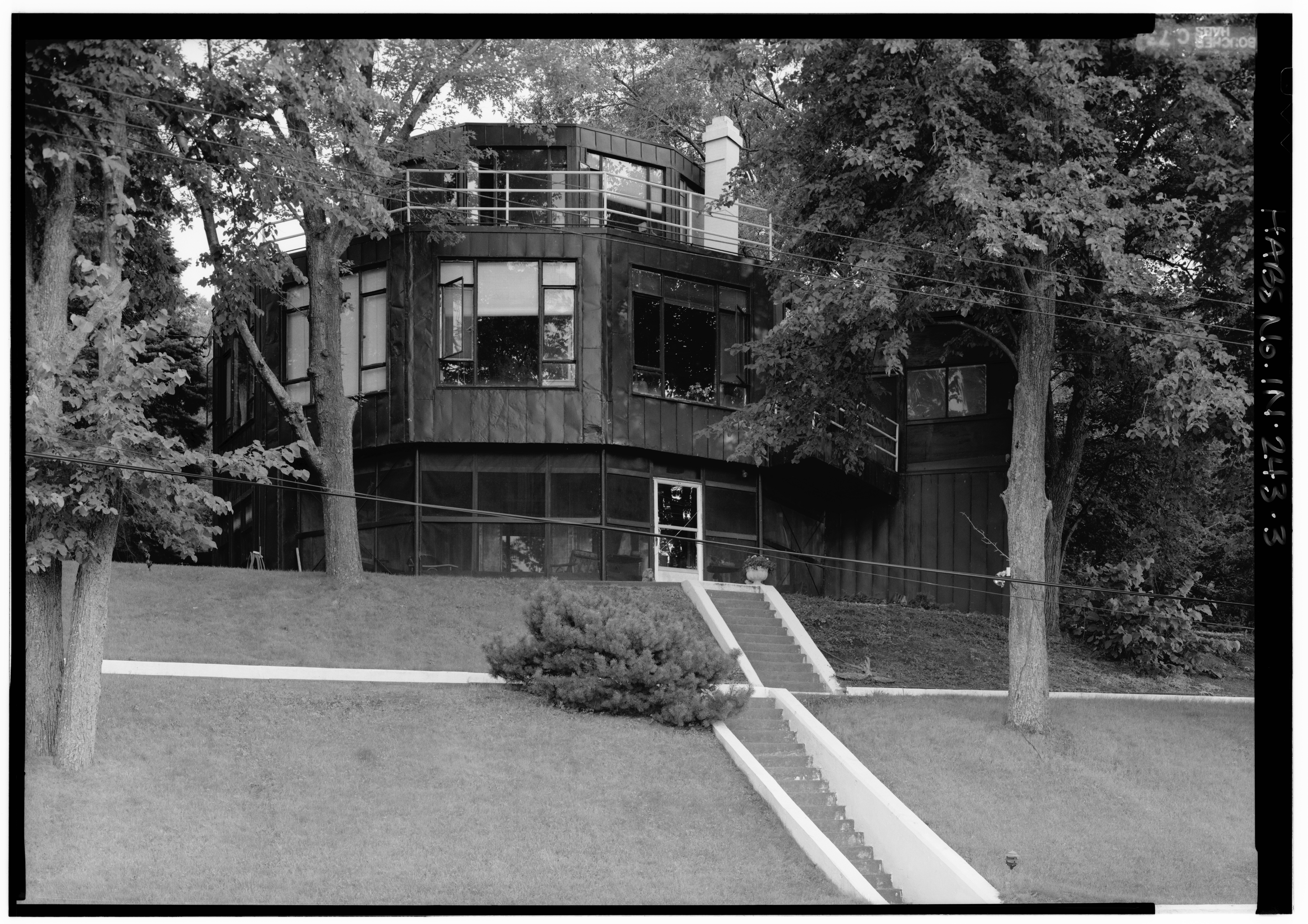
- House of Tomorrow, Century of Progress Architectural District
- Interactive map of the house (marked in red) among the others in the district
- Location: 214 Lake Front Dr., Beverly Shores, Indiana
- Coordinates: 41°41′3″N 87°0′6″W
- Built: 1933
- Architect: George Fred Keck
- Part of: Beverly Shores-Century of Progress Architectural District (ID86001472)
- Added to NRHP: June 30, 1986

The House of Tomorrow is a historic building in the Century of Progress Architectural District in Beverly Shores, Indiana, United States. The house was originally part of Chicago's 1933-34 Century of Progress Exposition. Designed as the house of the future, this house included its own airplane hangar. Glass walls offered views from every angle and so taxed the experimental air conditioning system that the cooling system failed.

== 1933 Century of Progress Exposition ==
The House of Tomorrow was built for the Century of Progress' 1933 Homes of Tomorrow Exhibition in Chicago, Illinois. Architect George Fred Keck's design reflected European modernism. The design conveyed the ideals of the fair and its emphasis on science and technology. Keck said he 'discovered' solar heating when he found workers inside the house wearing only shirtsleeves on a frigid winter day.

== Bartlett Development ==
After the close of the Century of Progress, the structure was sold to Robert Bartlett for $2,500. Bartlett was developing a resort community in Beverly Shores, Indiana. The house was placed on a barge and moved across Lake Michigan to Indiana. In April 1938, Bartlett sold the house to become a private residence.

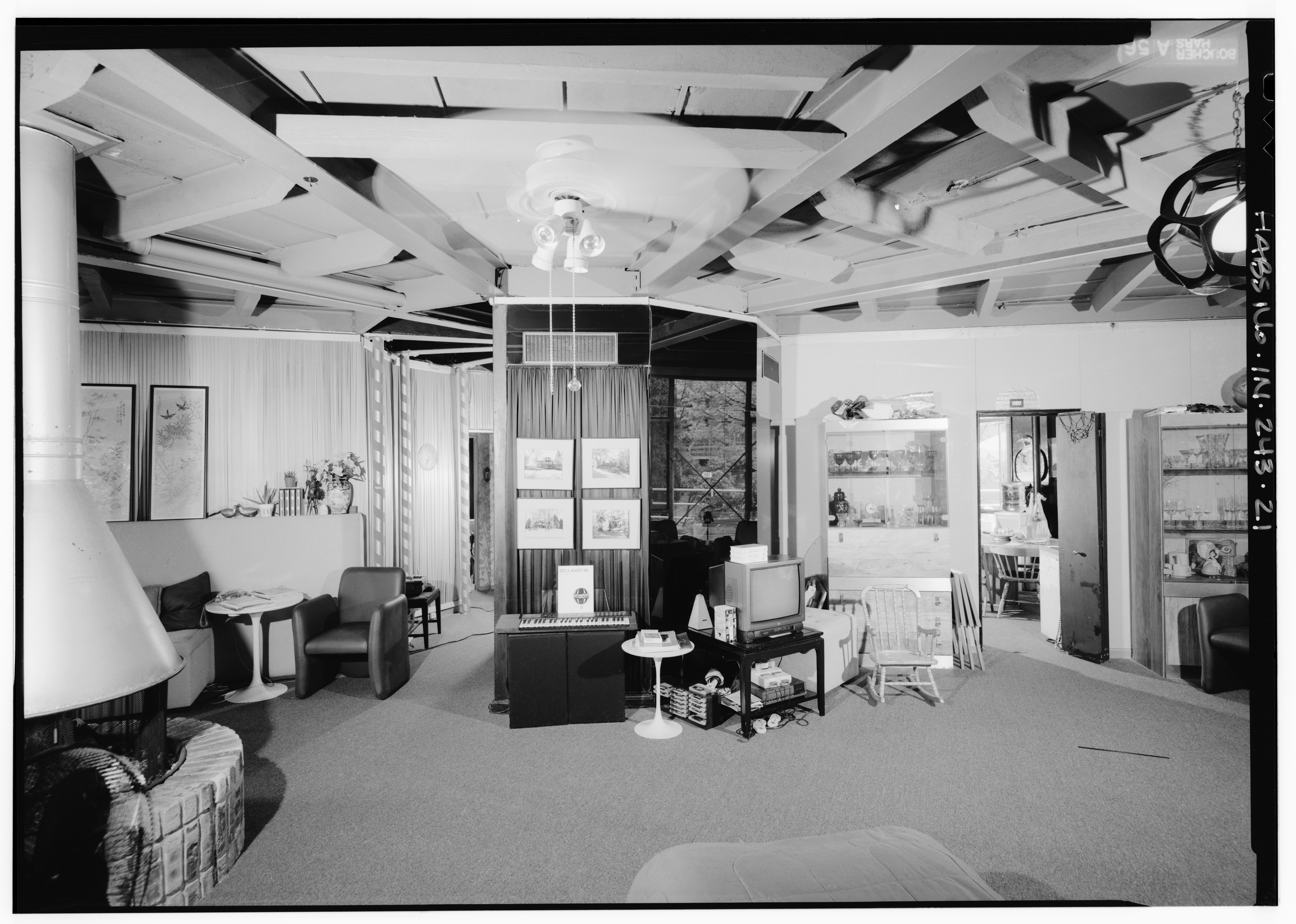

== Design ==
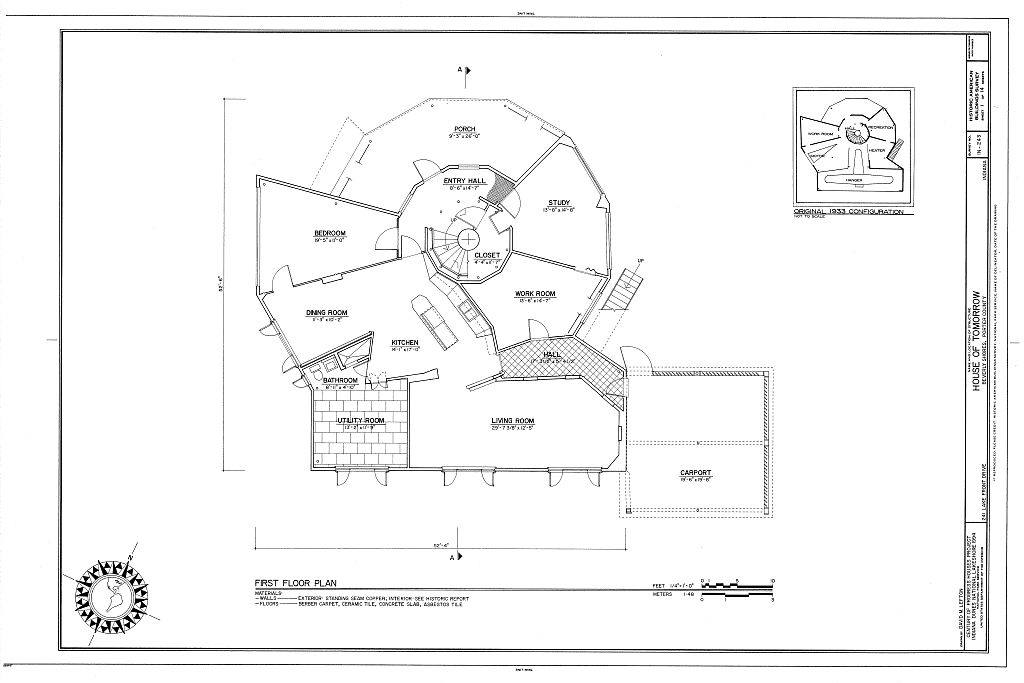
First floor plan of the House of Tomorrow, Beverly Shores, Indiana

The building is a three-story dodecagon, 42 feet in diameter. It was built using aluminum fascia with vermiculite interior walls. Plate glass walls are the most notable feature of the building. An airplane hangar was included, set four feet lower than the ground floor. When the house was moved to Beverly Shores, the ground floor was modified to make use of the garage and airplane hangar for living space. A carport was added. Windows were modified so that the occupants could open and close them to control the internal environment. The interior is designed around a central staircase in the dodecagonal prism structure. Most rooms are wedge shaped.

Keck's inspiration for the house came from an 1854 octagon house in his hometown of Watertown, Wisconsin.

== Restoration efforts ==
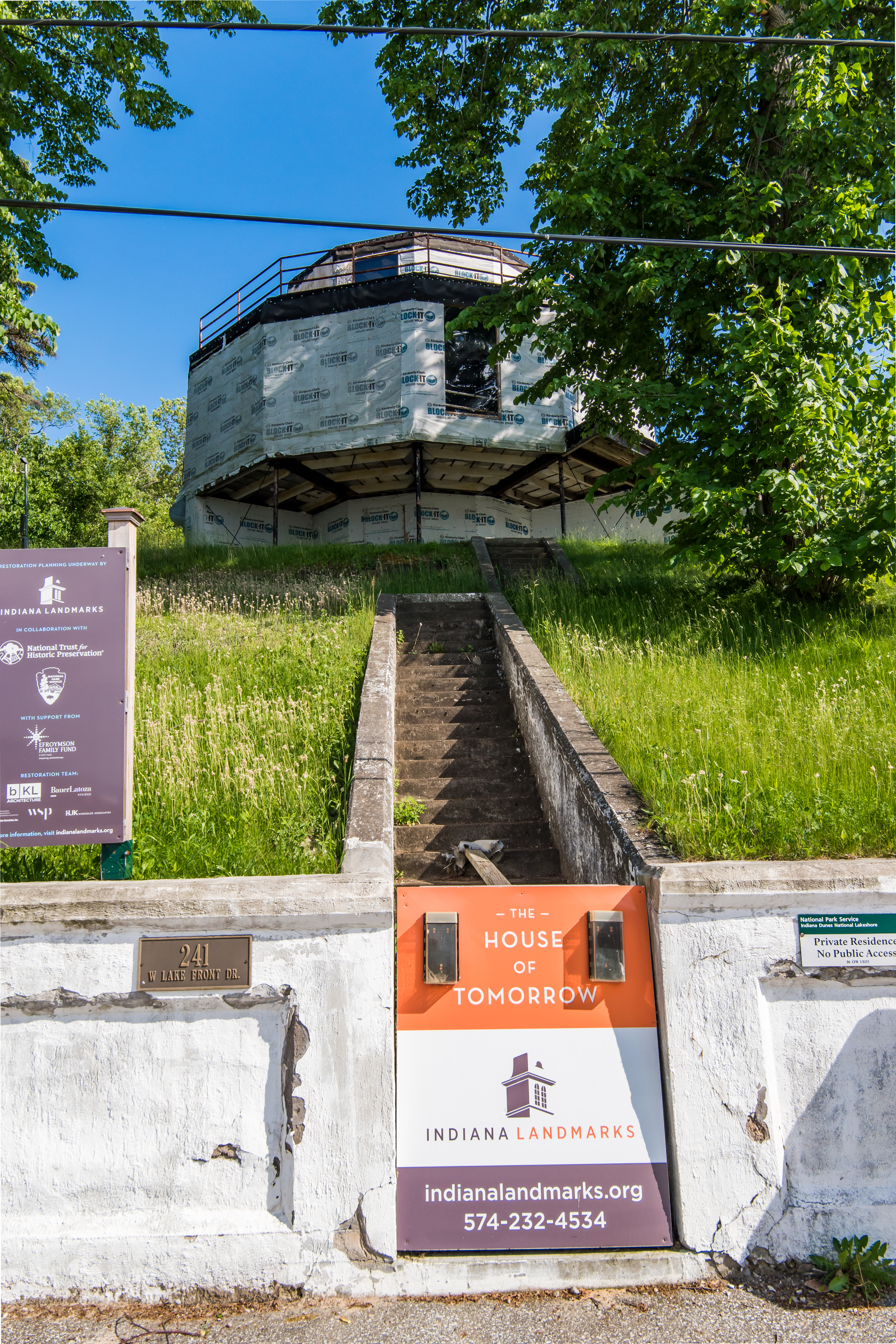
The house during restoration, 2020

Restoration efforts on the House of Tomorrow House were started in 1997, with the Indiana Dunes National Lakeshore and Indiana Landmarks searching for potential lessees to restore the building. As of 2011, the Park Service is once again looking for a long-term renter to complete the restoration of the property. The previous renter vacated the property after the restoration cost estimates exceeded previous budgeted amounts. The current restoration cost is estimated at $2 million. The restoration professionals were identified in March 2017.

The House of Tomorrow was named a National Treasure by the National Trust for Historic Preservation on 19 October 2016.

In February 2019, the Indiana Landmarks group announced that it was looking for someone to restore the House of Tomorrow, which it estimated would cost about $3 million. If a qualified person does the restoration, they will be granted a 50-year lease on the house.

In 2023, the House of Tomorrow received a $2 million grant from the Great American Outdoors Act, funded through the United States Department of the Interior. The grant doubled to $4 million by the start of the first phase of rehabilitation with the restoration of the house's original floor-to-ceiling exterior glass walls in November 2025. Triple-paned windows each weighing nearly 1,000 pounds (453.6 kilograms) were installed on all sides of the regular dodecagon-shaped structure. This phase is expected to be completed by 2026.

== See also ==
- Indiana Dunes National Park
- List of Registered Historic Places in Indiana
