= George Fred Keck =

American architect (1895–1980)

George Frederick Keck (1895–1980) was an American modernist architect based in Chicago, Illinois. He was later assisted in his practice by his brother William Keck to form the firm of Keck & Keck.

== Biography ==
Keck was born in Watertown, Wisconsin, the eldest of five boys. He studied engineering for a year at the University of Wisconsin and then studied architecture engineering at the University of Illinois. Starting in the 1920s, he worked as a draftsman for several Chicago firms, including D. H. Burnham & Company and Schmidt, Garden and Martin. He started his own practice in 1926, and was joined by his younger brother William five years later. George took an interest in the Deutscher Werkbund and the emerging International Style; his practice was the first in Chicago to design and construct International Style buildings.

== Career ==
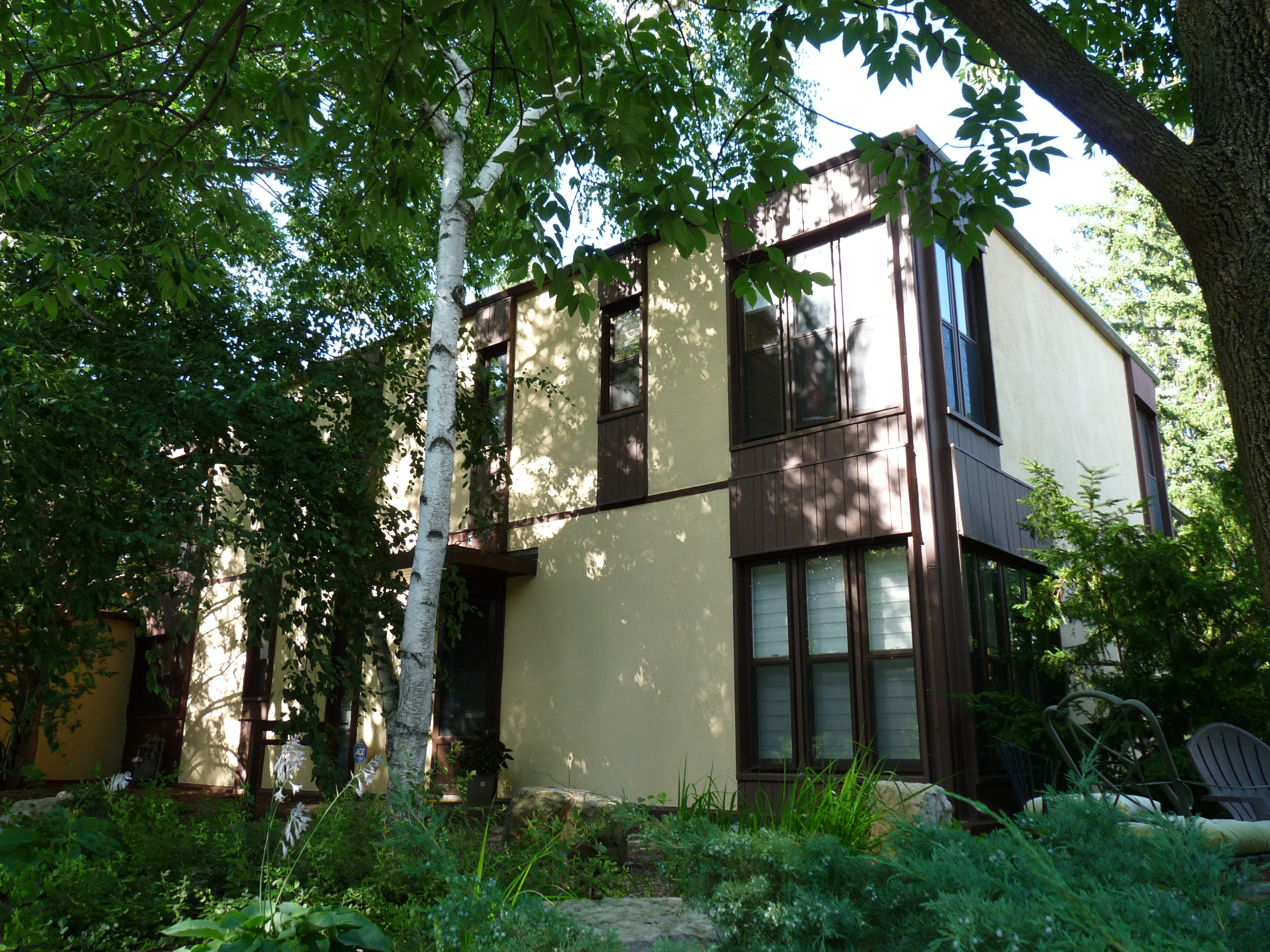
Morehouse house, 101 Ely Place in Madison, 1937

Keck designed two key model structures for the Century of Progress exhibition in Chicago in 1933; dubbed the "House of Tomorrow". At the time of its construction, the media dubbed the House of Tomorrow as “America’s first glass house.” These two structures played a key role in the development of Keck's form of modernism. In 1934 he designed another model house, "Crystal House", which was directly reminiscent of the work of Ludwig Mies van der Rohe and Marcel Breuer.

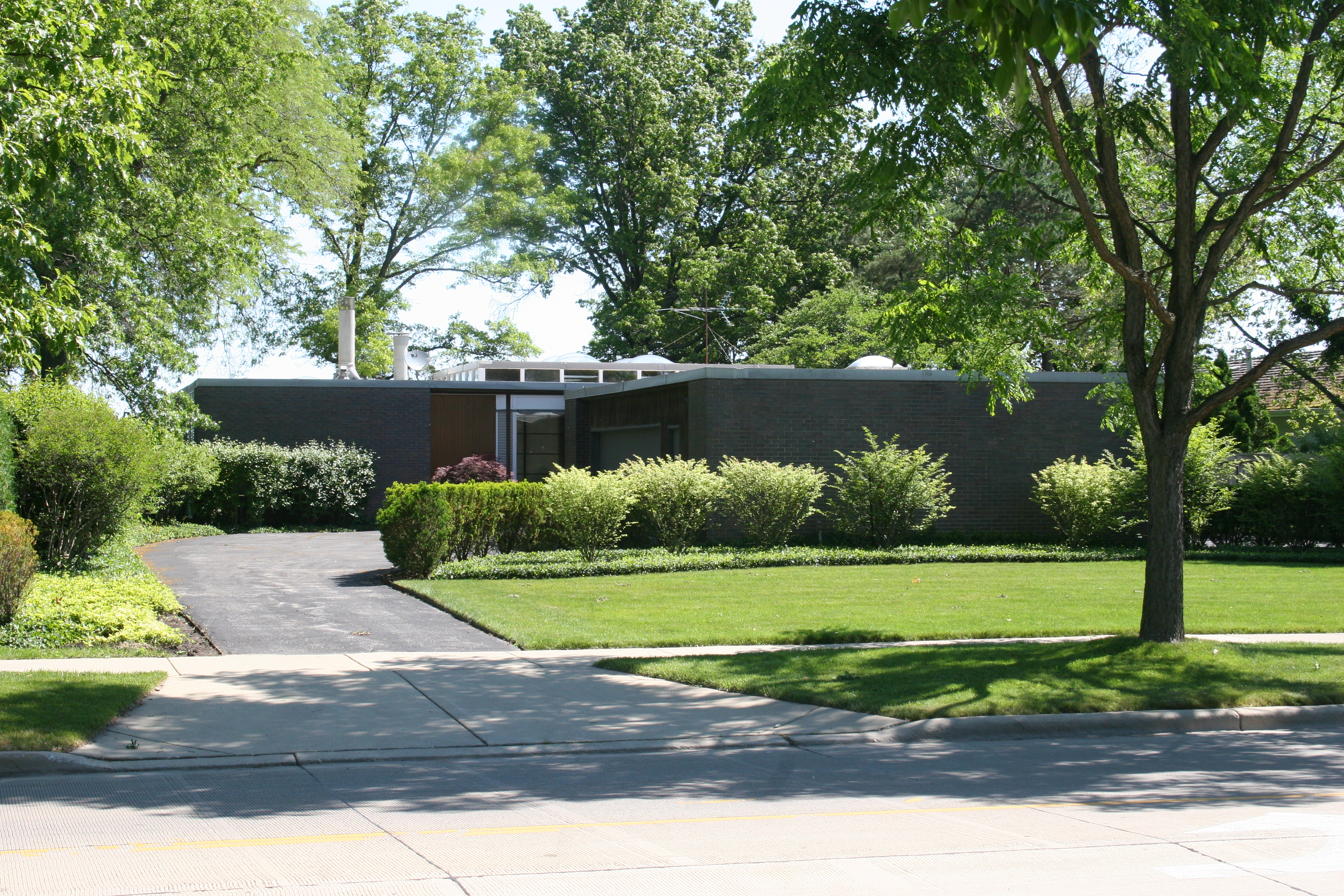
The Dr. Robert Hohf House, designed by Keck & Keck in Kenilworth, Illinois, 1957

Keck became a pioneering designer of passive solar houses in the 1930s and 40s after realizing that the all-glass "House of Tomorrow" was warm inside on sunny winter days prior to the installation of the furnace. Following this he gradually started incorporating more south-facing windows into his designs for other clients, and in 1940 designed a passive solar home for real estate developer Howard Sloan in Glenview, Illinois. The Sloan House was called a "solar house" by the Chicago Tribune, the first modern use of that term. Sloan then built a number of passive solar houses, and his publicity efforts contributed to a significant "solar house" movement in the 1940s.

Keck taught architecture at the New Bauhaus School (now IIT Institute of Design). He was the head of architecture there until 1942 and appointed Ralph Rapson as his successor. Rapson also worked in Keck's office during this period, as did fellow New Bauhaus School professor Robert Bruce Tague.

== Additional Sources ==
- William Keck at Chicago Architects Oral History Project
- George Fred and William Keck papers at Wisconsin Historical Society Archives
- "80 Years: The House of Tomorrow". solarhousehistory.com.
- "Keck's Sloan house II". solarhousehistory.com.
- "Keck's Solar Park today". solarhousehistory.com.
- "Fred Keck's unfinished book". solarhousehistory.com.
- "George Fred Keck Resources". solarhousehistory.com.
- Fred Keck video interview long segments, from 1970s by Joshua Kind, on Qualia etc. page, local media documentary archive
- The Wisconsin State Historical Society adding the Keck visual archive with photos. See their Visual Materials Collection, type Keck into search box next to Go button. Visual Materials in Our Collections
