= Bartlett Real Estate Office =

- U.S. National Register of Historic Places
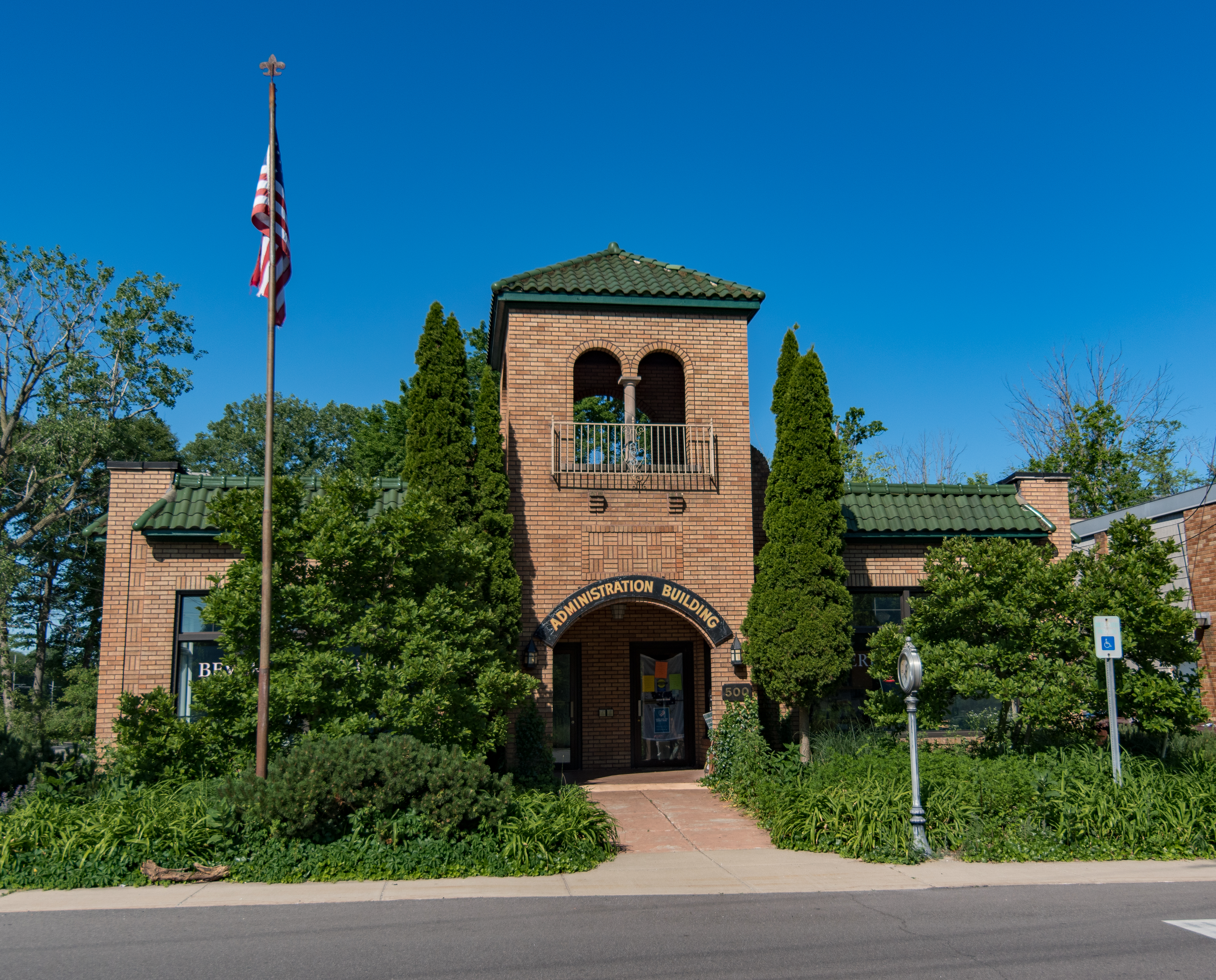
- The Bartlett Real Estate Office. Now the Town of Beverly Shores Town Offices
- Interactive map of Bartlett Real Estate Office
- Location: 500 South Broadway, Beverly Shores, Indiana
- Coordinates: 41°40′24″N 86°59′12″W
- Area: less than one acre
- Built: 1927
- Built by: Leo Post
- Architect: Fred Mertz
- Architectural style: Mission/Spanish Revival
- NRHP reference No.: 04000208
- Added to NRHP: March 23, 2004

The Bartlett Real Estate Office, also called the Frederick Bartlett Real Estate sales and administration building, was built in 1927 at 500 S. Broadway, Beverly Shores, Indiana. It is Mediterranean Revival style. Bartlett also chose this style for the houses in his new development of Beverly Shores. Since 1946, it has served as the Beverly Shores Administration Building, with the clerk-treasurer's office, a public and town council meeting room, and the town marshal's office.

The town is a small community at the southernmost tip of Lake Michigan, 40 miles (64 km) southeast of Chicago, Illinois. About 4,000 years ago, the dunes formed as a result of the formation of large bays, which silted up. In Beverly Shores, roads had to be graded through and over the dunes, and some areas were leveled off for development. The town is now an island of private homes surrounded by the Indiana Dunes National Lakeshore, a federal park administered by the National Park Service. Across Broadway is the original Beverly Shores South Shore Railroad Station. The station was the first point of contact for prospective clients of Bartlett's, and it presented a unified appearance to the development to clients, with its stuccoed Mediterranean Revival exterior.

== Exterior ==
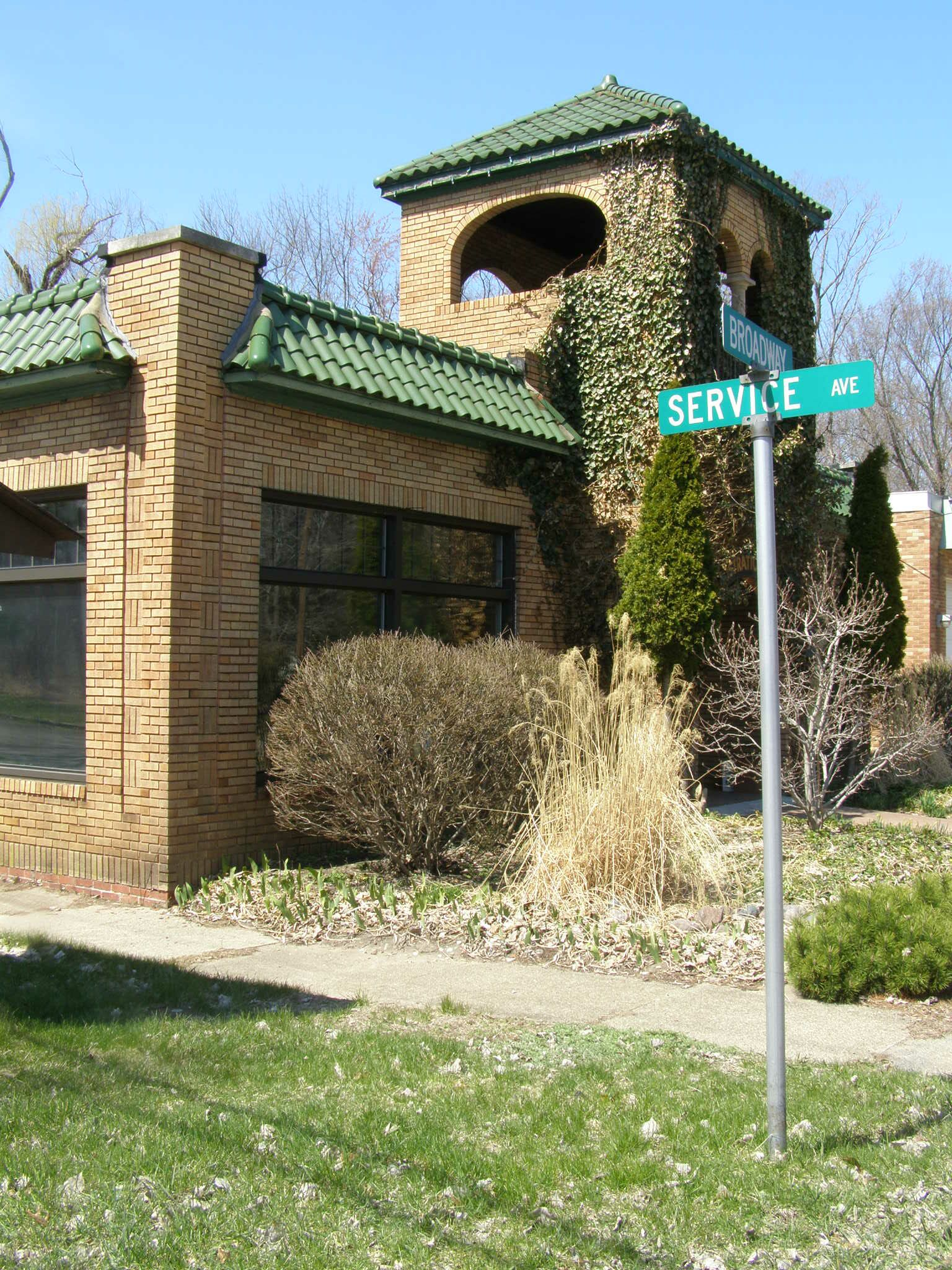
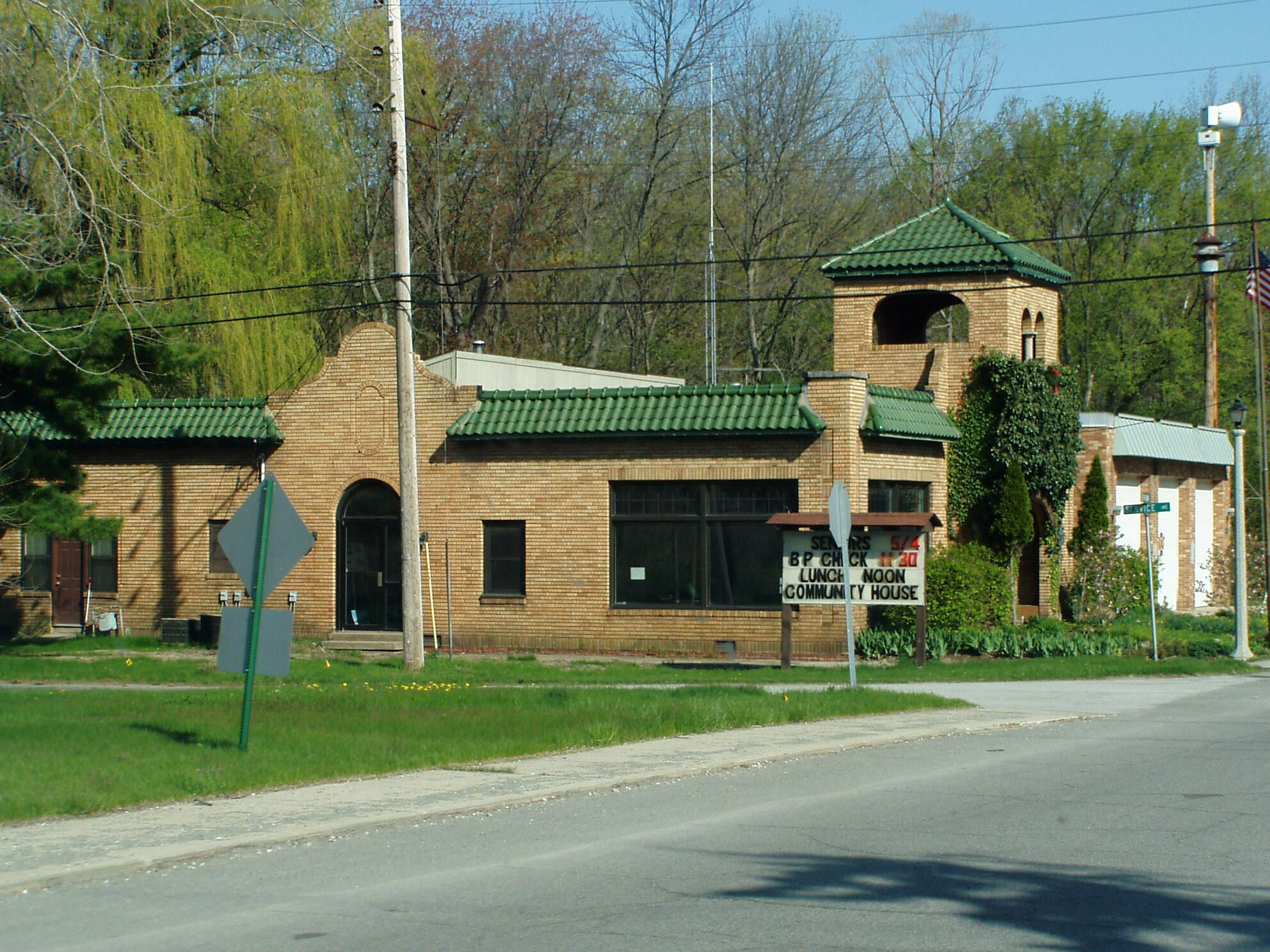

The Bartlett building is a one-story, masonry building with tan brick walls. The main entrance features an arch, which is the base to a two-story tower. It has a poured concrete foundation. The tower has iron railings and green wood trim. The main section has a flat roof with a rubber membrane, masked by a hipped skirt roofs on the parapets. This skirt roof is covered in green terra-cotta tile. The tower has a pyramidal hip roof covered in same green tile. It faces east toward Broadway, the main north–south road in the town. The Southshore, Chicago and South Bend Railway station is, leading from the interurban station to the Lake Michigan beach. It is a tripartite composition of two large storefront bays, flanking the arched central entrance tower. The sand-colored brick walls were laid with a variety of patterns: there is a soldier course around the foundation and above all storefront openings, and header courses for storefront sills (photo 3). At the front corners of the building, two large square piers extend into the parapet and interrupt the tiled roofs. These have slightly recessed vertical panels with basketweave brickwork – three vertical bricks alternating with three horizontal. The large, two pane plate glass storefront windows themselves were installed in 1995, to replicate the original configuration.

== Interior ==
Originally, the interior was divided into two functions: a front sales office room consisting of one open space, and a rear section with living quarters for a salesman / caretaker. The two front doors led one into the sales room. There was a line of load bearing posts running down the center of the room. In the 1980s, the city had contractors divide the room, using the posts to define two separate rooms, yet the posts remain visible in the drywall. A door connects the two rooms toward the west end. The north side of the front area is now the office of the clerk-treasurer. A small area to the west of the north room was further divided off to provide a bathroom and storage space. The south side room remains largely open and is used as the meeting room for the town council (photo 6). The wood floors throughout are now covered in carpeting, however, the pressed metal ceiling remains exposed in all but the marshal's office. Schoolhouse style lights are not original but are similar to those once used in the building. There are also contemporary ceiling fans in each room. In the meeting room, an original arched vertical car-sided door remains on back wall. It led to a hallway of the caretaker's quarters. The marshal's office occupies most of the former caretaker's office now. Though ceilings were lowered with a suspended tile system in the marshal's office, the original Murphy bed from the building's caretaker days remains in place.

== Bibliography ==
- Cohen, Ronald D. and McShane, Stephen G. Moonlight in Duneland, the Illustrated Story of the Chicago, South Shore and South Bend Railroad. Bloomington and Indianapolis: I.U. Press, 1998.
- Indiana Historic Sites and Structures Inventory. Porter County Interim Report. Indianapolis: Historic Landmarks Foundation of Indiana, 1991.
- McAlester, Virginia and Lee. A Field Guide to American Houses. New York: Alfred A. Knopf, 1997.
- Morrow, James. Images of America, Beverly Shores, A Suburban Dunes Resort. Chicago: Arcadia Publishing, 2001.
- National Register of Historic Places Inventory-Nomination Form. Beverly Shores – Century of Progress Architectural District, listed June 30, 1986.
- Papard, Pauline. "Beverly Shores Celebrates 50th Anniversary," Michigan City News Dispatch, January 5, 1997, pp. 1 and 6.
- Stodola, Barbara. "Carl O. Reed and the Wide-Awake World of Beverly Shores," The Beacher, vol. 19, no. 30, July 31, 2003, pp. 1–5.
- Taylor, Robert Jr., et al. Indiana: A New Historical Guide. Indianapolis: Indiana Historical Society, 1989.
