= Beverly Shores, Indiana =

- Town
- Town of Beverly Shores
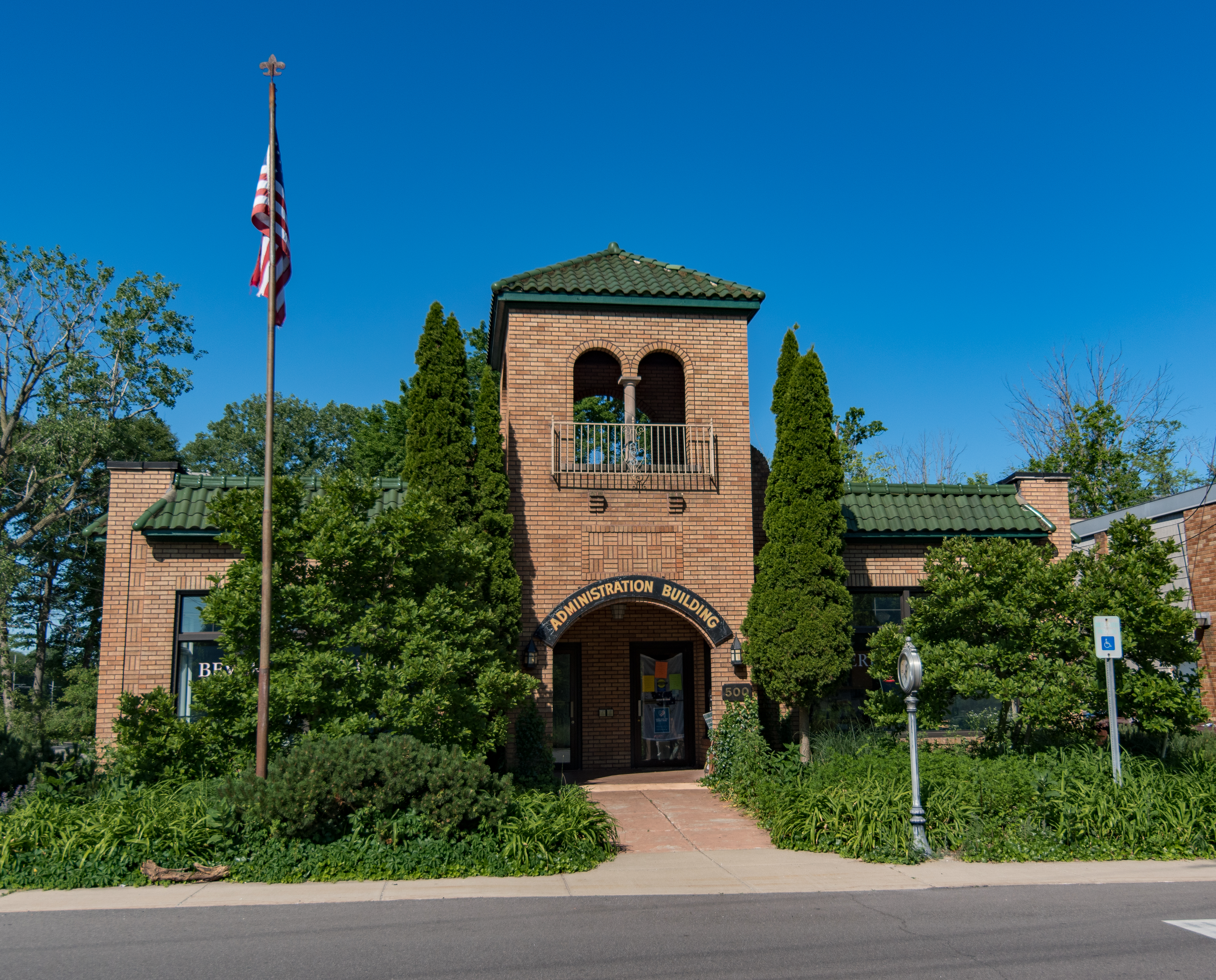
- The Town of Beverly Shores Administration Building
- Interactive map of Beverly Shores, Indiana
- Coordinates: 41°41′03″N 86°59′08″W
- Country: United States
- State: Indiana
- County: Porter
- Township: Pine
- Incorporated: January 1, 1947

Government
  - Type: Town Council
  - Members: Geof Benson (D); Greg Brown (R); Donna Norkus (D); Brian O'Neil (D); Jon Voelz (D)
  - Clerk-Treasurer: Ellen Hundt (D)

Area
  - Total: 5.83 sq mi (15.09 km^{2})
  - Land: 3.58 sq mi (9.28 km^{2})
  - Water: 2.24 sq mi (5.81 km^{2})
- Elevation: 604 ft (184 m)

Population (2020)
  - Total: 599
  - Density: 167/sq mi (64.5/km^{2})
- Time zone: UTC-6 (CST)
  - Summer (DST): UTC-5 (CDT)
- ZIP code: 46301
- Area code: 219
- FIPS code: 18-05158
- GNIS feature ID: 2396590
- Website: www.in.gov/towns/beverlyshores/

Beverly Shores is a town in Pine Township, Porter County, Indiana, United States, about 36 miles (58 km) east of downtown Chicago. The population was 597 as of the 2023 5-year ACS census.

== History ==
Beverly Shores began life as a planned resort community. The Chicago, Lake Shore & South Bend Railway began to provide service from South Bend to Chicago shortly after 1900. The Chicago businessman Samuel Insull reorganized the line as the Chicago, South Shore & South Bend (today's South Shore Line) in 1925, upgrading the stations and encouraging tourism. A number of promotional posters were issued, many of which remain in print.

The Frederick H. Bartlett Company, at that time one of Chicago's largest real-estate developers, bought 3,600 acres (1,500 ha) in the area in 1927, and plotted thousands of homesites. He named the prospective development Lake Shore, North Shore Beach and South Shore Acres. The Great Depression dampened its prospects, and many of the plots were never built on.

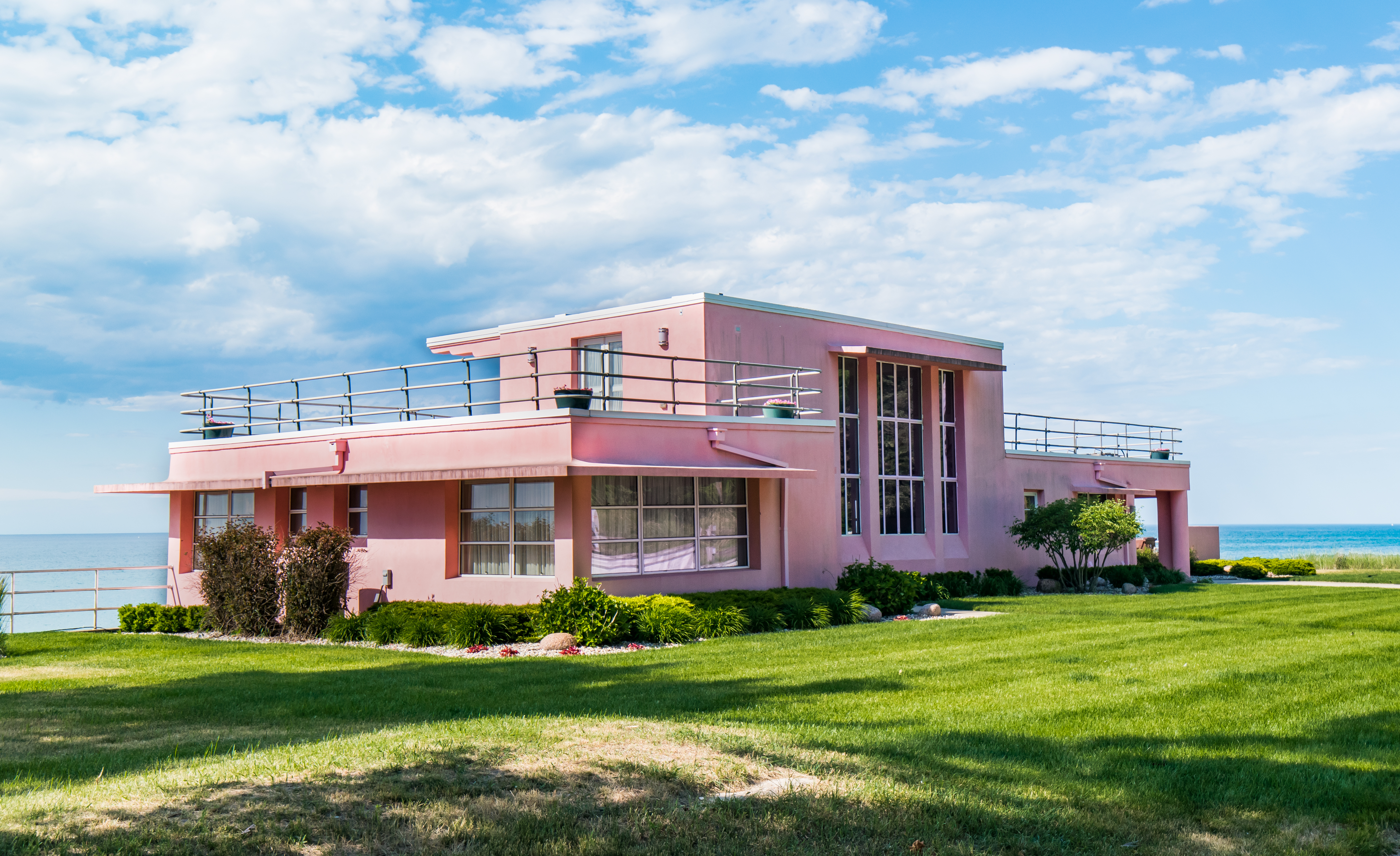
The Florida Tropical House, part of the town's Century of Progress Architectural District

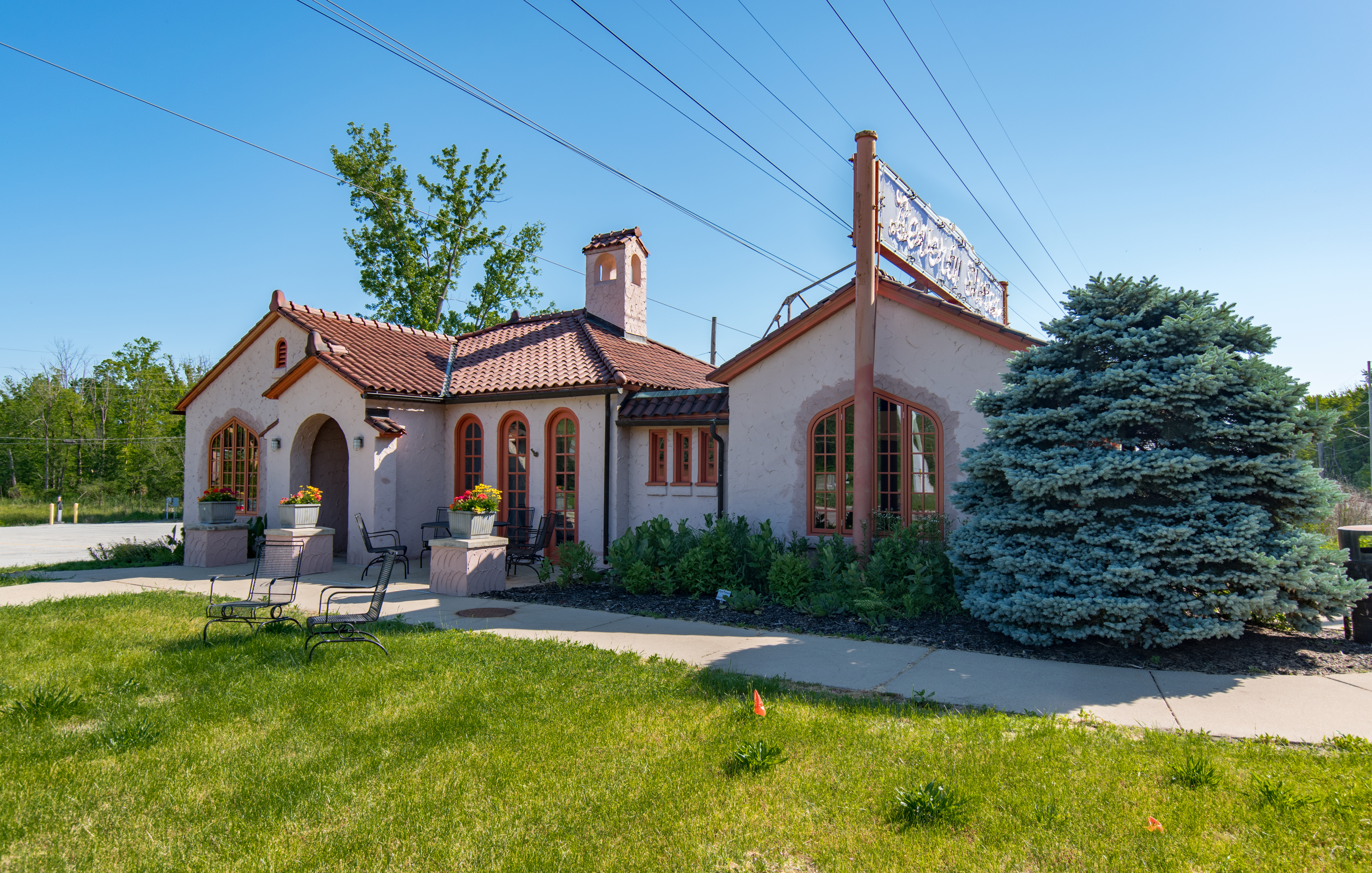
The Beverly Shores train station

Robert Bartlett, Frederick Bartlett's brother, purchased the properties in 1933. He named the entire development after his daughter Beverly, and continued to develop its infrastructure with roads, a school, a golf course, and a hotel. He purchased and relocated sixteen structures from Chicago's 1933-34 Century of Progress World's Fair, four of which were transported by barges on Lake Michigan.

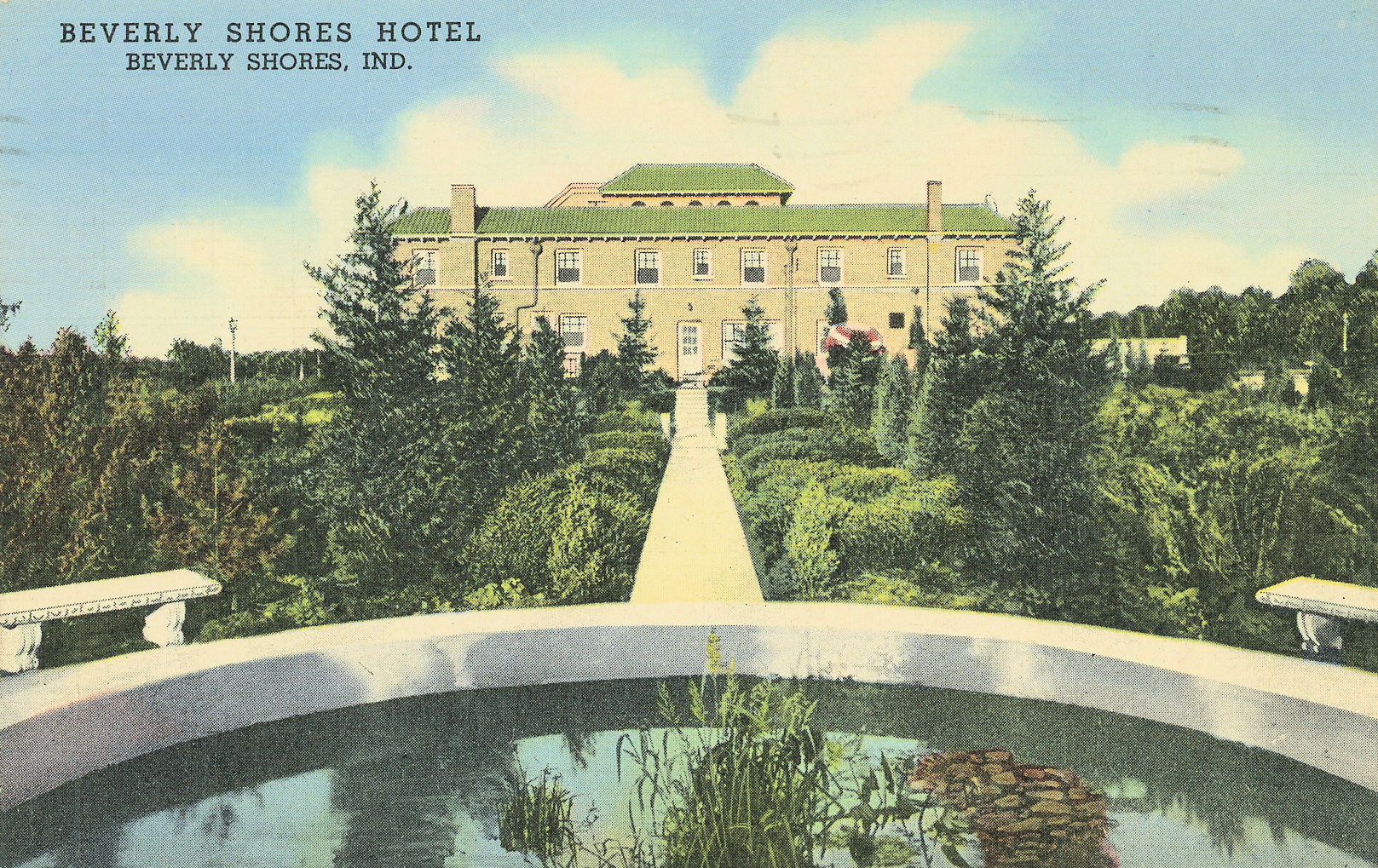
The former Beverly Shores Hotel, in Beverly Shores. The hotel opened in June 1934 and was converted into the Beverly Shores Rest Home in March 1952. Acquired by the National Park Service, the structure was destroyed by fire in October 1974.

The community was incorporated in 1947. After World War II, a number of industrial developments, including Burns Harbor, were built to the west, and by the 1950s environmental organizations had begun to push for preservation of the area. The Indiana Dunes National Lakeshore was established in 1966. During the 1970s, there was a movement to purchase all the homes in Beverly Shores and incorporate the entire town into the National Lakeshore. This initiative did not succeed, but many local properties were acquired, especially those in the wetlands that constitute the southern portion. The acquisition process is ongoing. The owners of lots fronting on the beach were granted lifetime leasebacks with the proviso that the property would revert to the National Lakeshore; many of these houses have since been demolished.

The 1970s saw a period of record high lake levels and beach erosion; the owners of lakefront properties often responded by dumping large quantities of concrete blocks (riprap) onto the sand in front of their houses, which continue to mar the beach. The beach is now conspicuously public, although nearby parking is limited.

A resurgence of development took place during the 1990s and 2000s, when many million-dollar-plus houses were built on the dunes near the lakefront. In the early 2000s, excessive levels of arsenic, boron, lead, and manganese were found in wells in the nearby town of Pines, and pipelines delivering Lake Michigan water treated by Michigan City were extended into Beverly Shores. This time period also saw explosive growth of the local white-tailed deer population, a problem that has polarized its residents.

In 1998, the Spanish Colonial Revival train depot, originally built in 1929, was reopened following a historic renovation. The restored train depot now also houses a museum, displaying historic photographs and memorabilia, and a gallery, featuring rotating exhibits of local art.

Easily accessible from Chicago, Beverly Shores is a second home to many Chicagoans who are referred to locally as some-timers. Both full-time and some-time residents come together for community activities such as ice skating on the frozen pond during Winterfest, the 5k Necktie Race held on Father's Day, and the annual summertime event the Fireman's Ball which raises money for the volunteer fire department.

Beverly Shores has always enjoyed the reputation of being a "gay-friendly" community. Along with the acceptance of gay culture, Beverly Shores has long been a haven for artists.

Beverly Shores attracts many visitors, particularly nature enthusiasts, cyclists and bird watchers, who come to enjoy the beaches and the marshlands. Overnight lodging options are limited but visitors who wish to stay the night can reserve a campsite at Dunewood Camp.

On June 24, 2014, the International Dark-Sky Association announced Beverly Shores as the world's seventh international dark sky community.

== Geography ==
Located along the Lake Michigan shoreline and adjacent to the Indiana Dunes National Park, the town was initially developed as a planned resort community of second homes for Chicago residents. Six sites are listed in the National Register of Historic Places. These include a cluster of six buildings that were transported by barge from the Homes of Tomorrow Exhibition of the 1933 Century of Progress World's Fair which took place in Chicago. This site is known as the Century of Progress Architectural District. Beverly Shores is located at 41°41′03″N 86°59′08″W, along the Lake Michigan shoreline. It is bordered by Indiana Dunes State Park on the west, Lake Michigan on the north, the village of Pines on the south, and Michigan City on the east. Much of the immediate area is part of Indiana Dunes National Park.

According to the 2010 census, Beverly Shores has a total area of 5.82 square miles (15.07 km^{2}), of which 3.58 square miles (9.27 km^{2}) (or 61.51%) is land and 2.24 square miles (5.80 km^{2}) (or 38.49%) is water.

== Demographics ==
Historical population
Census	Pop.	Note	%±
1950	488		—
1960	773		58.4%
1970	946		22.4%
1980	864		−8.7%
1990	622		−28.0%
2000	708		13.8%
2010	613		−13.4%
2020	599		−2.3%
U.S. Decennial Census

=== 2010 census ===
As of the census of 2010, there were 613 people, 312 households, and 193 families residing in the town. The population density was 171.2 inhabitants per square mile (66.1/km^{2}). There were 527 housing units at an average density of 147.2 per square mile (56.8/km^{2}). The racial makeup of the town was 96.6% White, 1.3% African American, 0.3% Asian, 0.8% from other races, and 1.0% from two or more races. Hispanic or Latino of any race were 2.8% of the population.

There were 312 households, of which 12.8% had children under the age of 18 living with them, 54.8% were married couples living together, 5.4% had a female householder with no husband present, 1.6% had a male householder with no wife present, and 38.1% were non-families. 32.7% of all households were made up of individuals, and 15.4% had someone living alone who was 65 years of age or older. The average household size was 1.96 and the average family size was 2.45.

The median age in the town was 59 years. 9.8% of residents were under the age of 18; 3.8% were between the ages of 18 and 24; 10.4% were from 25 to 44; 41.9% were from 45 to 64; and 34.1% were 65 years of age or older. The gender makeup of the town was 50.2% male and 49.8% female.

=== 2000 census ===
As of the census of 2000, there were 708 people, 340 households, and 213 families residing in the town. The population density was 197.9 people per square mile (76.4 people/km^{2}). There were 524 housing units at an average density of 146.5 per square mile (56.6/km^{2}). The racial makeup of the town was 97.60% White, 0.71% African American, 0.42% Asian, 0.14% from other races, and 1.13% from two or more races. Hispanic or Latino of any race were 0.28% of the population.

There were 340 households, out of which 11.2% had children under the age of 18 living with them, 54.4% were married couples living together, 4.1% had a female householder with no husband present, and 37.1% were non-families. 29.7% of all households were made up of individuals, and 10.9% had someone living alone who was 65 years of age or older. The average household size was 2.08 and the average family size was 2.53.

In the town, the population was 11.4% persons under the age of 18, 4.9% aged 18 to 24, 20.3% aged 25 to 44, 40.8% aged 45 to 64, and 22.5% who were 65 years of age or older. The median age was 51 years. For every 100 females, there were 110.1 males. For every 100 females age 18 and over, there were 110.4 males.

The median income for a household in the town was $159,107, and the median income for a family was $81,203. Males had a median income of $146,389 versus $38,750 for females. The per capita income for the town was $40,825. About 4.0% of families and 4.9% of the population were below the poverty line, including 5.4% of those under age 18 and 1.4% of those age 65 or over.

== Education ==
Beverly Shores' school district is Michigan City Area Schools. For this municipality, the zoned elementary school is Pine Elementary School, and the zoned middle school is Barker Middle School. Michigan City High School is the district's sole comprehensive high school.

== Landmarks ==
Beverly Shores buildings in the National Register of Historic Places include:

- The Bartlett Real Estate Office (added 2004 - Building #04000208), also known as Beverly Shores Administration Building, at 500 South Broadway
- The Beverly Shores South Shore Railroad Station (built 1929, added 1989 - Building #89000411), Broadway Avenue and US 12
- Beverly Shores--Century of Progress Architectural District (added 1986 - District #86001472), also known as World's Fair Houses, at 208, 210, 212, 214, and 215 Lake Front Drive
- The Imre and Maria Horner House (designed by Otto Kolb) (added 1996 - Building #96001006)
- The Dr. John and Gerda Meyer House (built 1961, added 2012)
- Solomon Enclave

== See also ==
- Miller Beach
- Ogden Dunes
- Dune Acres, Indiana
