= Arthur U. Gerber =

American architect

- Born: 1878
- Died: 1960 (aged 81–82)
- Occupation: Architect

Arthur Uranus Gerber (1878–1960) was a commercial architect who resided in Evanston, Illinois and whose designs included a number of transit stations in the Chicago metropolitan area, at least five of which have since been placed onto the National Register of Historic Places. He was originally employed by Northwestern Elevated Railroad, then moved on to design other buildings for its successor, the Chicago Rapid Transit Company. He improved interurban railroads such as the Chicago North Shore & Milwaukee Railroad, the Chicago South Shore and South Bend Railroad, and the Chicago Aurora & Elgin Railroad as each came under the control of utilities tycoon Samuel Insull.

== Styles ==
Gerber was an eclectic architect who worked in several major styles: Craftsman, Bungaloid, Prairie, Beaux Arts, Spanish Colonial aka "Insull Spanish", and Moderne. Not all of his works were of these styles. The Lake Shore (also known as Pines) and Beverly Shores stations along the South Shore Line were both of the Spanish style, including stucco walls and red tile roofs as is the sole remaining Skokie Valley Route station of the North Shore Line, Briergate, in Highland Park, Illinois. The Kenosha station on 63rd Street and the Dempster station in Skokie, both of which are standing, are a blend of Bungaloid and Prairie styles, somewhat reminiscent of Frank Lloyd Wright style. The Mundelein North Shore Line station was a twin of the Kenosha station but it was torn down in the 1960s following abandonment of the North Shore Line in 1963.

== Famous works ==
- Beverly Shores station, South Shore Line
- Lake Shore station, South Shore Line
- Former 11th Street station, South Shore Line
- Original Dempster station, Chicago 'L' and North Shore Line
- Villa Park, CA&E station
- Wilson, Chicago 'L' station
- Linden, Chicago 'L' station
- Kenosha, Wisconsin, North Shore Line station

== Remaining works ==
Beverly Shores and the Michigan City depots in Indiana are still standing though the City of Michigan City recently bought the station there and plans on saving just the Beaux Arts facade, replacing everything behind it. In Illinois his stations in Skokie at Dempster, Villa Avenue in Villa Park; in Chicago, Wilson Avenue (Uptown), Sheridan Road, and Howard Street are still standing. Beverly Shores is partially an art gallery, partially a train station. Wilson is still a CTA stop and, as of 2017, is under restoration. The Dempster Street station, following relocation from its original site 130 feet east in 2002, hosts a Starbucks and is across from the contemporary CTA terminal, but it not used for trains. Villa Avenue is used by the Villa Park Historical Society as a museum. Kenosha's station was given a historic facelift and is used as an educational facility.

== Additional Reading ==
"Celebrating the 110th Anniversary of the Skokie Valley Route's Opening." First & Fastest Magazine, Summer 2026. Norm Carlson. Article showcasing Gerber's "Insull Spanish" stations built in 1925/26 for the then new North Shore Line Skokie Valley line with historic photos.

"Where Do We Begin: The Rebuilding of an Interurban Railroad." First & Fastest Magazine, Spring 2026. Edward W. Tobin and Norm Carlson. Feature article on the stations of Arthur Gerber including the seldom covered Milwaukee station of the North Shore Line.

"Arthur Gerber" Insull's Transit Architect." First & Fastest Magazine, Spring 2007. Tom Burke and Graham Garfield. Detailed and comprehensive history of Arthur Gerber and his works.

"Insull's Architect: The Railroad Stations of Arthur Gerber." Locomotive & Railway Preservation Magazine, March-April 1996. Tom Burke. Overview of Gerber and his works along with discussion of then current battle to save his Dempster Street station in Skokie from demolition.

== Gallery ==
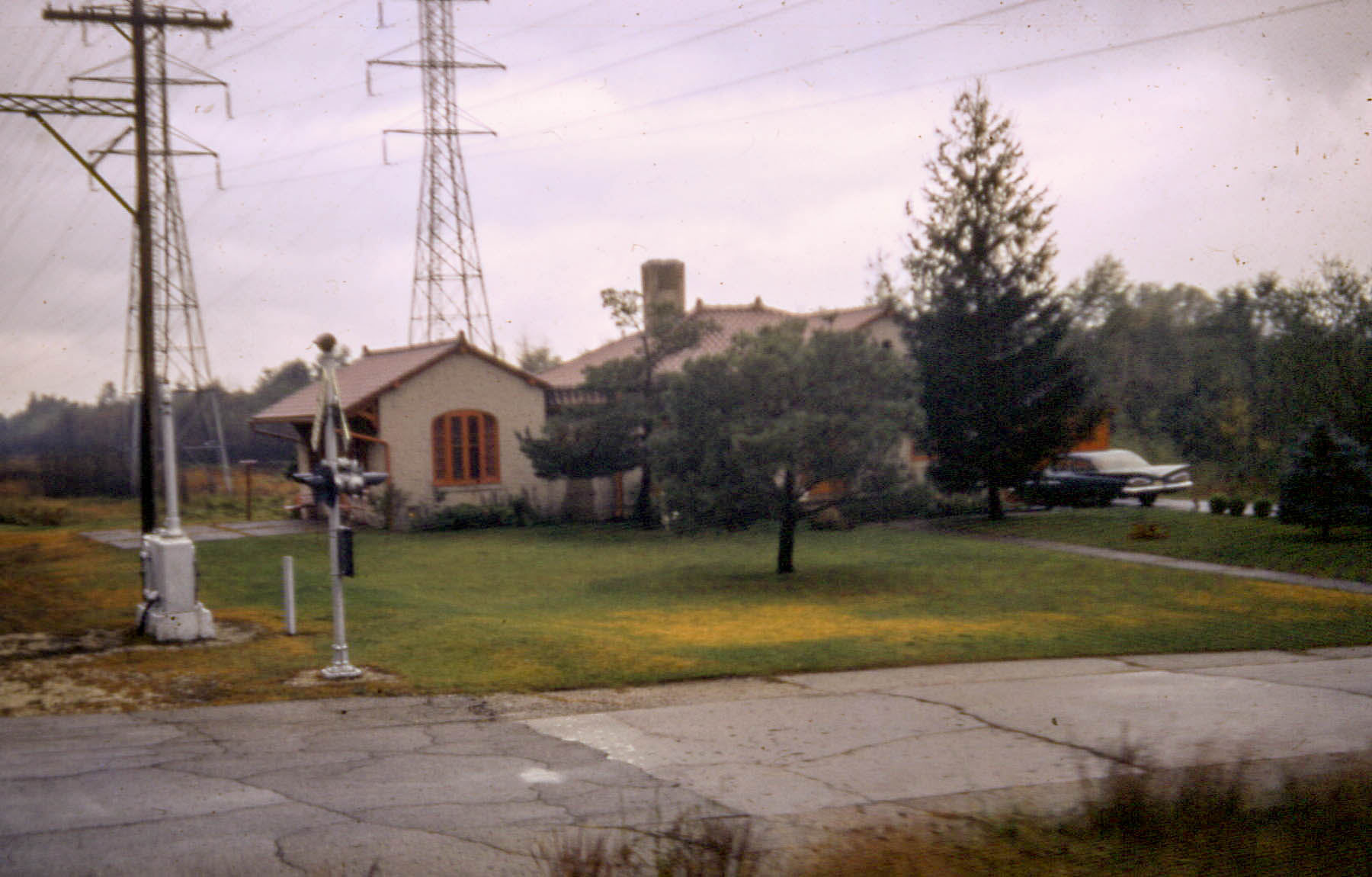
Lake Shore station,
built in 1927

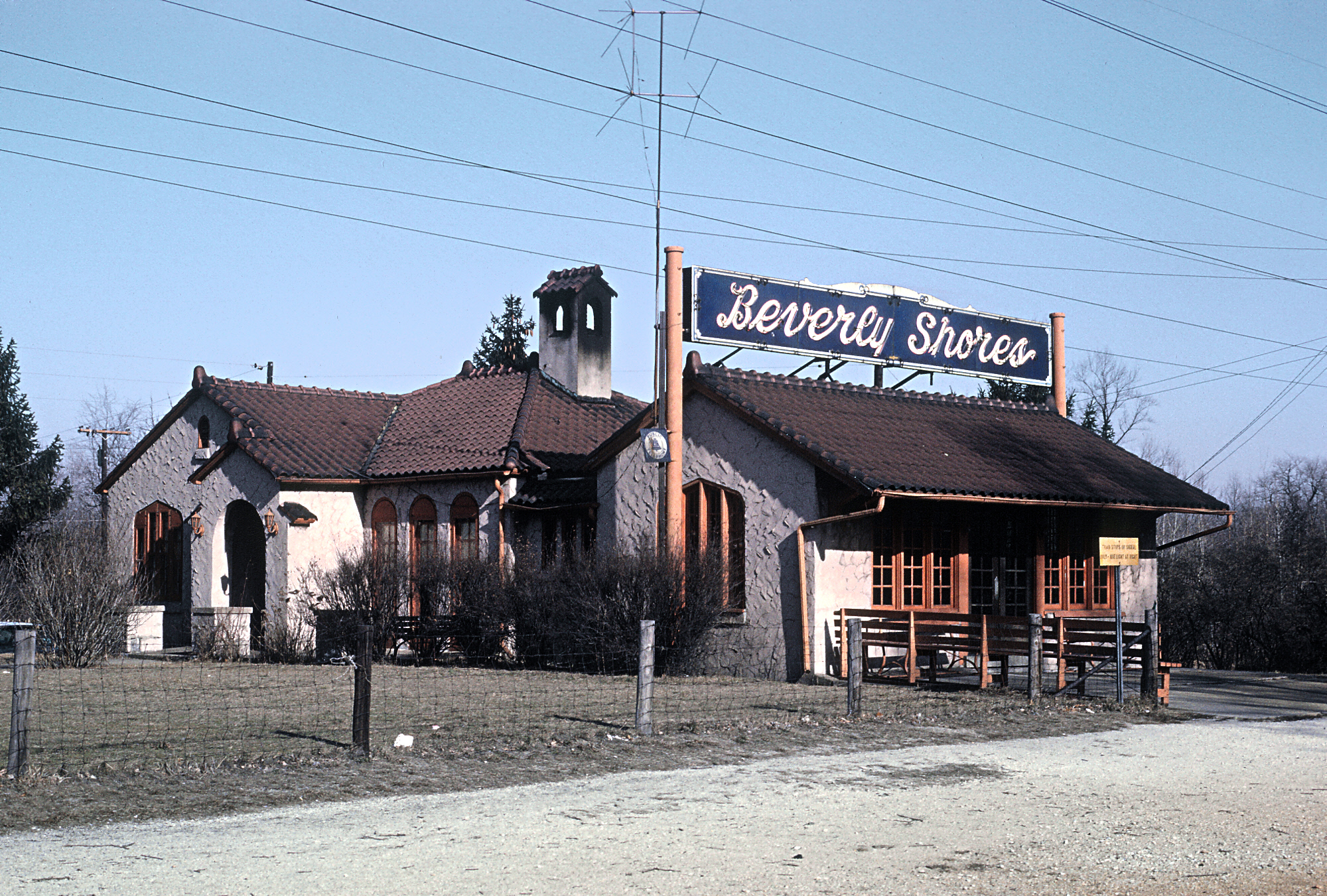
Beverly Shores station,
built in 1929

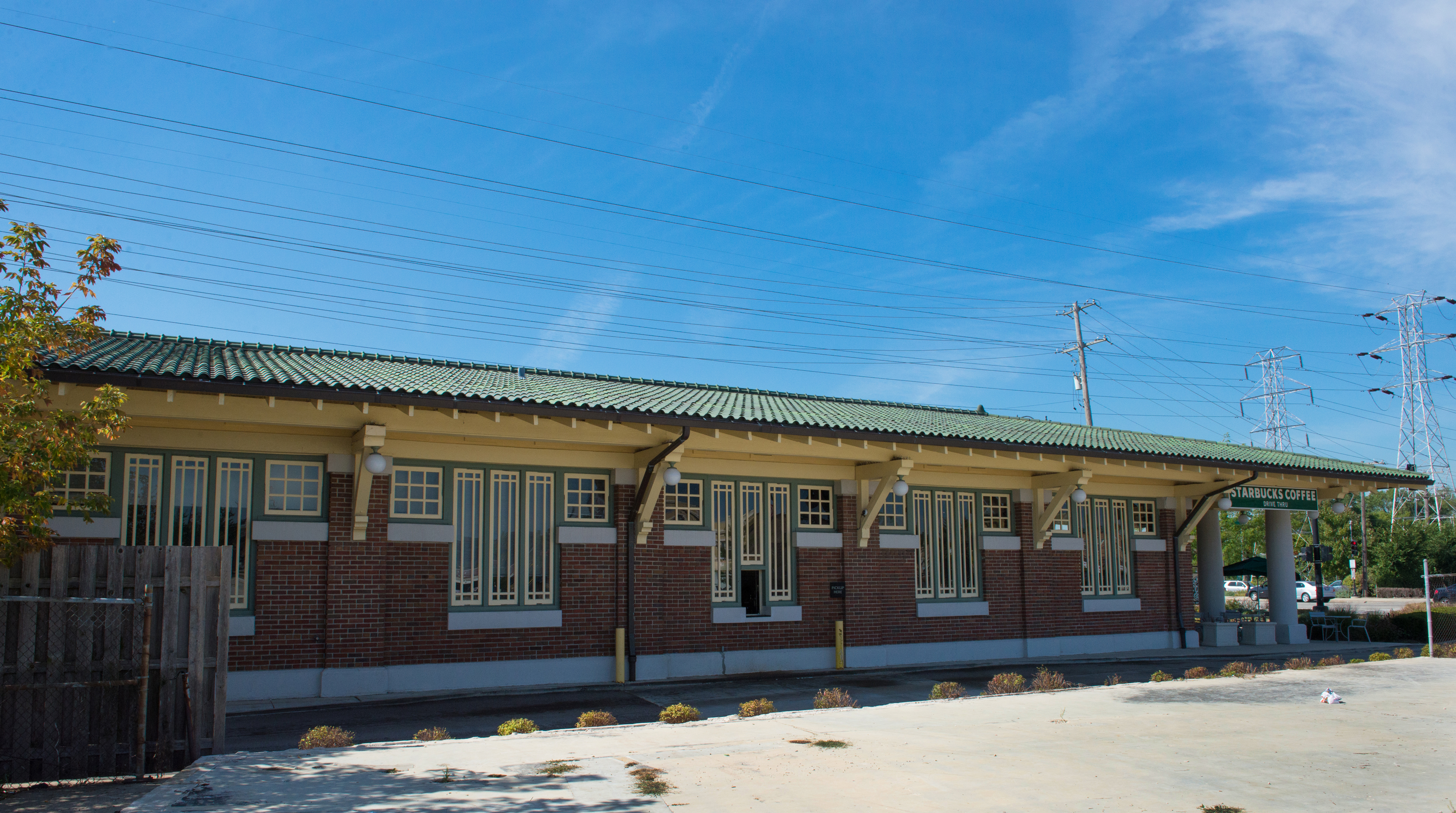
Dempster Station, Skokie, Illinois

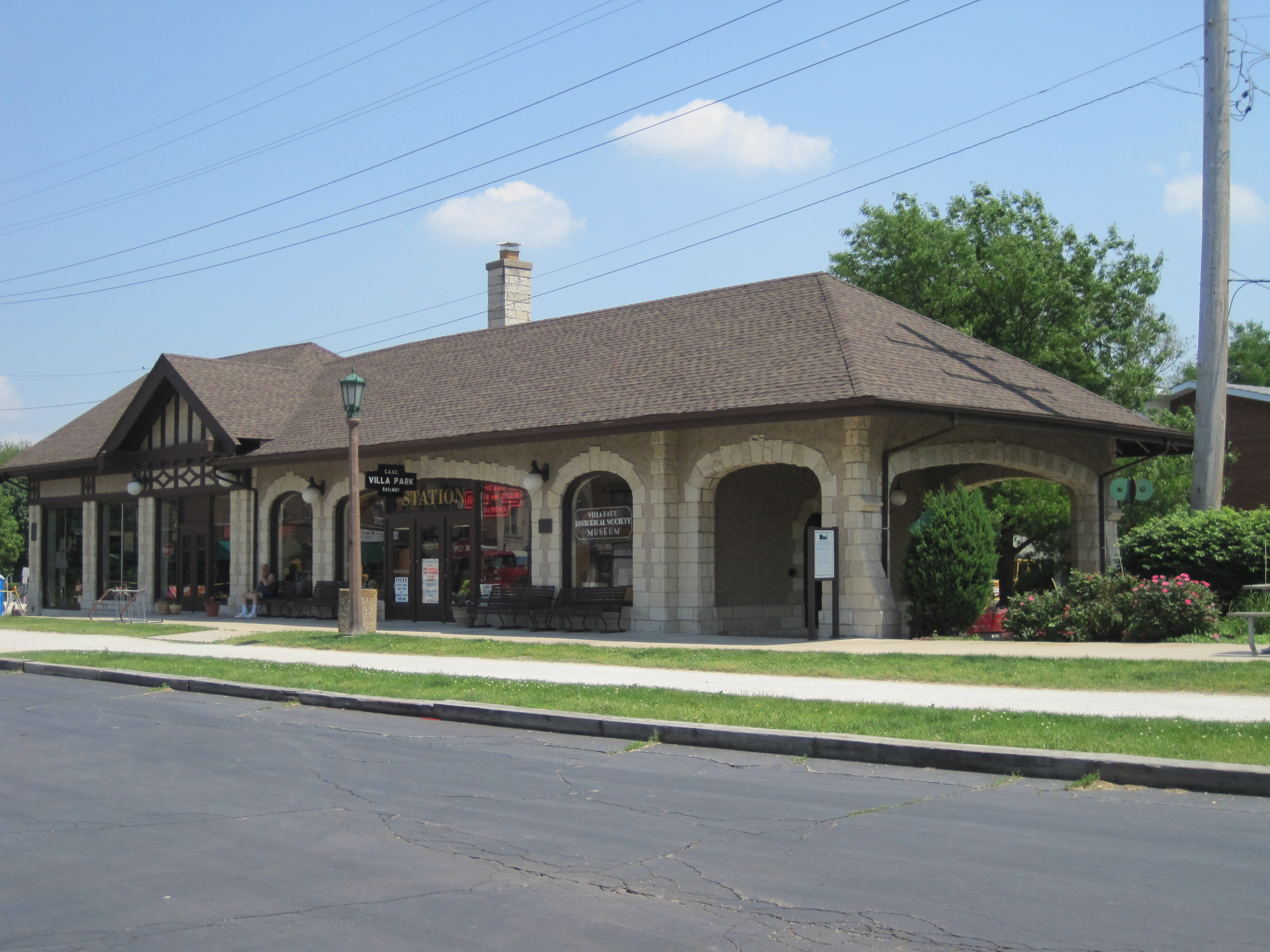
Villa Avenue Station, Villa Park, Illinois

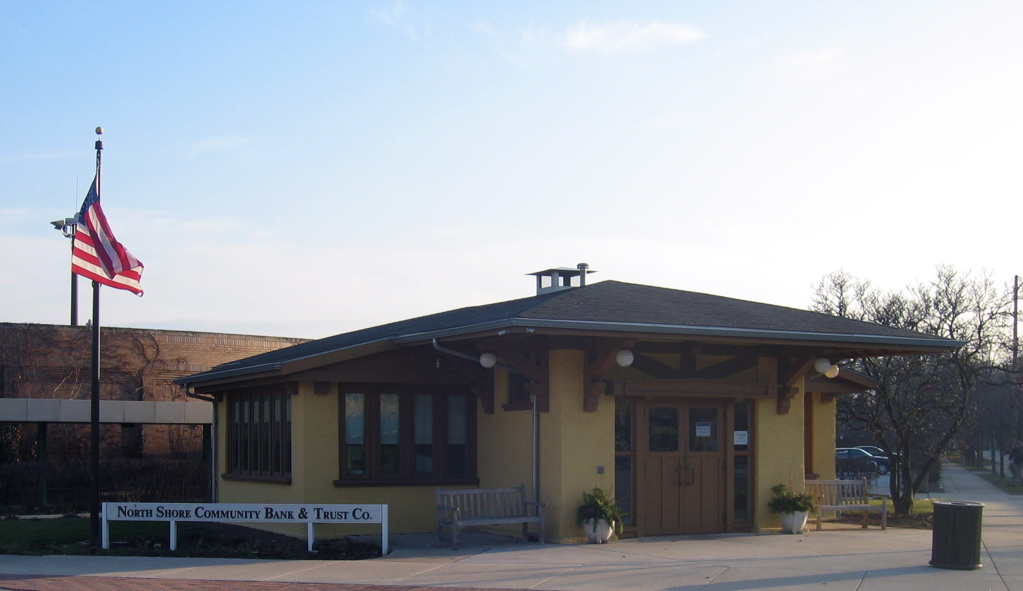
Linden Station, Chicago, Illinois

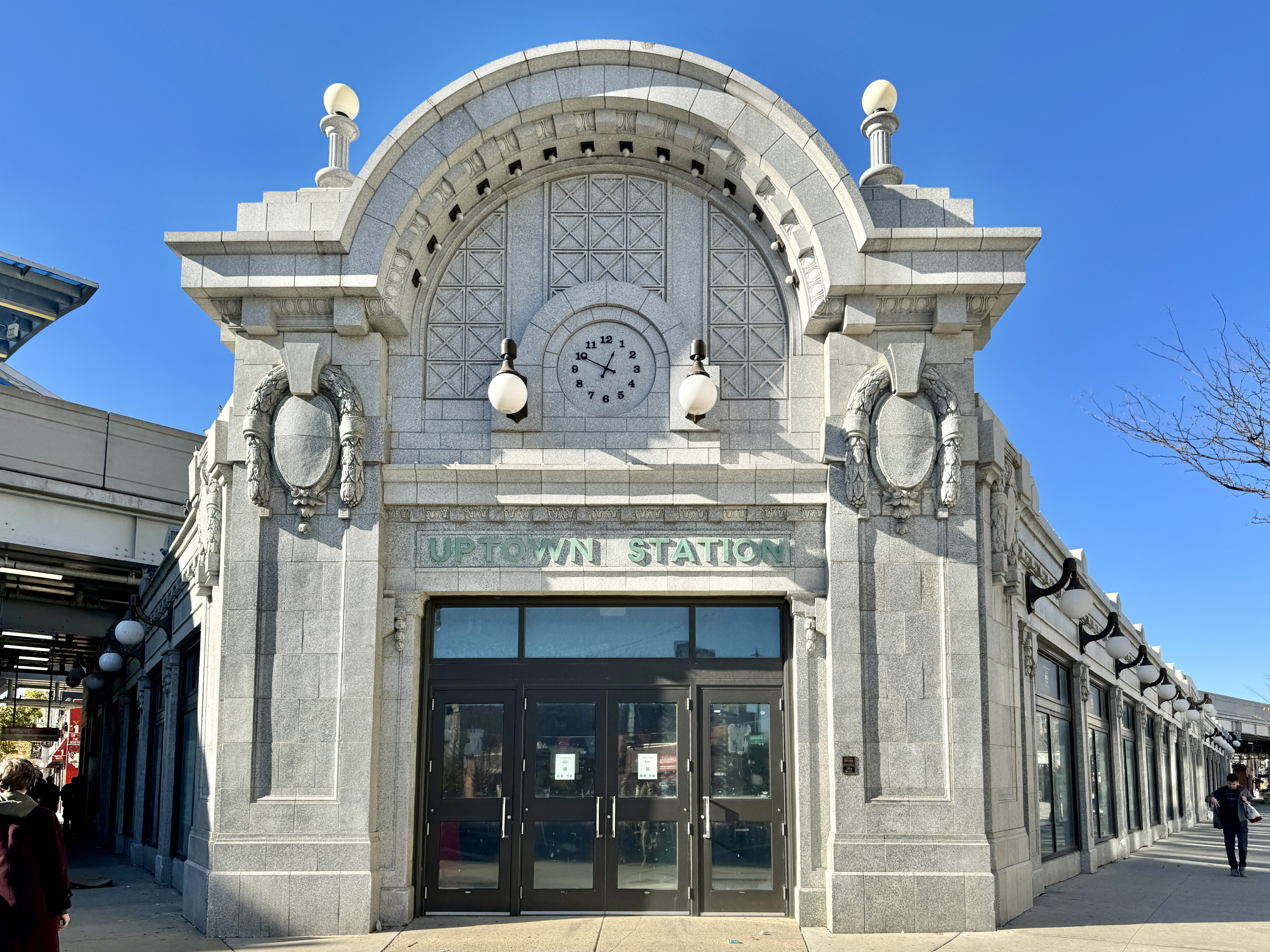
Wilson station building, Chicago, Illinois, known as the Gerber Building
