= Imre and Maria Horner House =

Historic house in Indiana, United States

- U.S. National Register of Historic Places
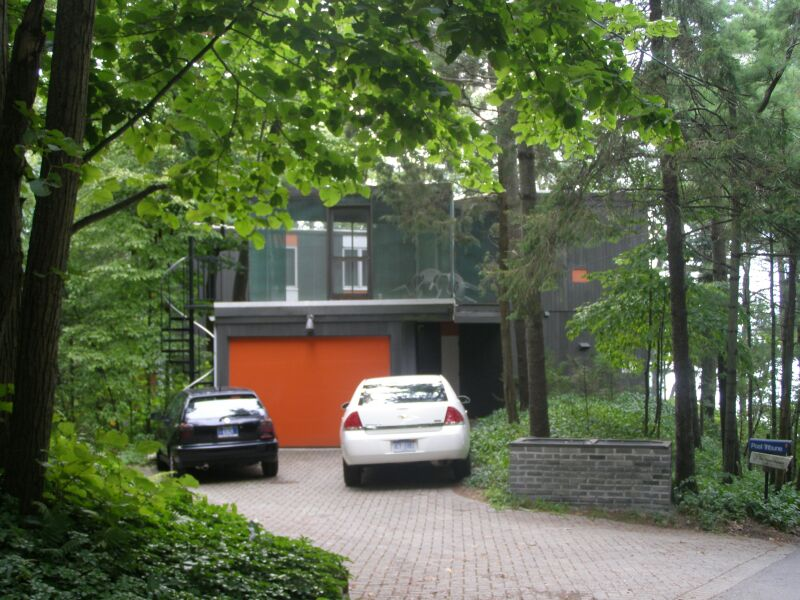

- Location within Indiana Location within the United States
- Location: 2 Merrivale Ave., Beverly Shores, Indiana
- Coordinates: 41°41′33″N 86°58′46″W
- Area: 1.1 acres (0.45 ha)
- Built: 1949
- Architect: Kolb, Otto
- Architectural style: International Style
- NRHP reference No.: 96001006
- Added to NRHP: September 25, 1996

The Horner House is a historic house at 2 Merrivale Street in Beverly Shores, Indiana. It is an excellent example of the mid-twentieth century architectural movement known as the International Style, interpreted by architects like Marcel Breuer, Ludwig Mies van der Rohe, Walter Gropius and Philip Johnson for buildings constructed in America following World War II. It is the work of a master artist of the second generation to be influenced by this school, the Swiss architect and designer, Otto Kolb.

The Horner House is designed into the landscape and reflects a movement toward increased ecological and environmental awareness in the second half of the twentieth century. It was listed on the National Register of Historic Places in 1996.

== Exterior ==
The overall design of the house is straightforward: glass, redwood and pine lumber, transits with some aluminum and brass flashing. The roofs are flat; built-up with paper, tar, and gravel and in some cases, on the terraces, the addition of pine duck boards. The main house is a 24 by 45 feet (7.3 by 13.7 m) rectangle. The first floor has a one-story living room and screened porch extended from the two-story portion. The rest of the main floor includes a kitchen, bathroom and small study or guest room. The second floor has a bathroom, a large bedroom and a second bedroom/studio.

The north and south walls of the one-story living room are wood framed 4 by 8 inches (10 cm × 20 cm) columns. The columns are carried beneath the floor line to rest on concrete block foundation walls. 2 by 8 inches (5.1 cm × 20.3 cm) floor joists on 16 inches (41 cm) centers carry the rough floor. The full-height exterior bay walls are of plate glass. The glass was shipped from Pittsburgh, on special order, by rail and delivered to the contractor at the site for erection. One of the panels, on the screen porch or south side of the living room wall, is capable of sliding open to a full door of 8 by 9 feet (2.4 m × 2.7 m), by means of a continuous steel slide and steel barn door hangers. As stated above, the exterior materials used in the Horner House include naturally bleached heart redwood, bevelled joint cladding, always used vertically, and plate glass. The two-story core of the main house contains manufactured casement windows, transite spandrels and heads with redwood corners and facias. The doors are solid lumber core, stained and varnished. The screened porch is constructed of four built-up columns, suspended from the cantilevered ceiling joists. The floors are pine varnished. The copper screen has been attached with copper-headed nails to the uprights in 36" horizontal bands and then hand-sewn with copper wire at the selvage edges to form a floor-to ceiling screen "wall", in four bays, along its 32 feet (9.8 m) length. The screens presently in place on the porch are original.

The basement lies beneath the two-story core portion of the main house. It has no exterior openings and contains a gas furnace, a water heater and several appliances.

== Interior ==
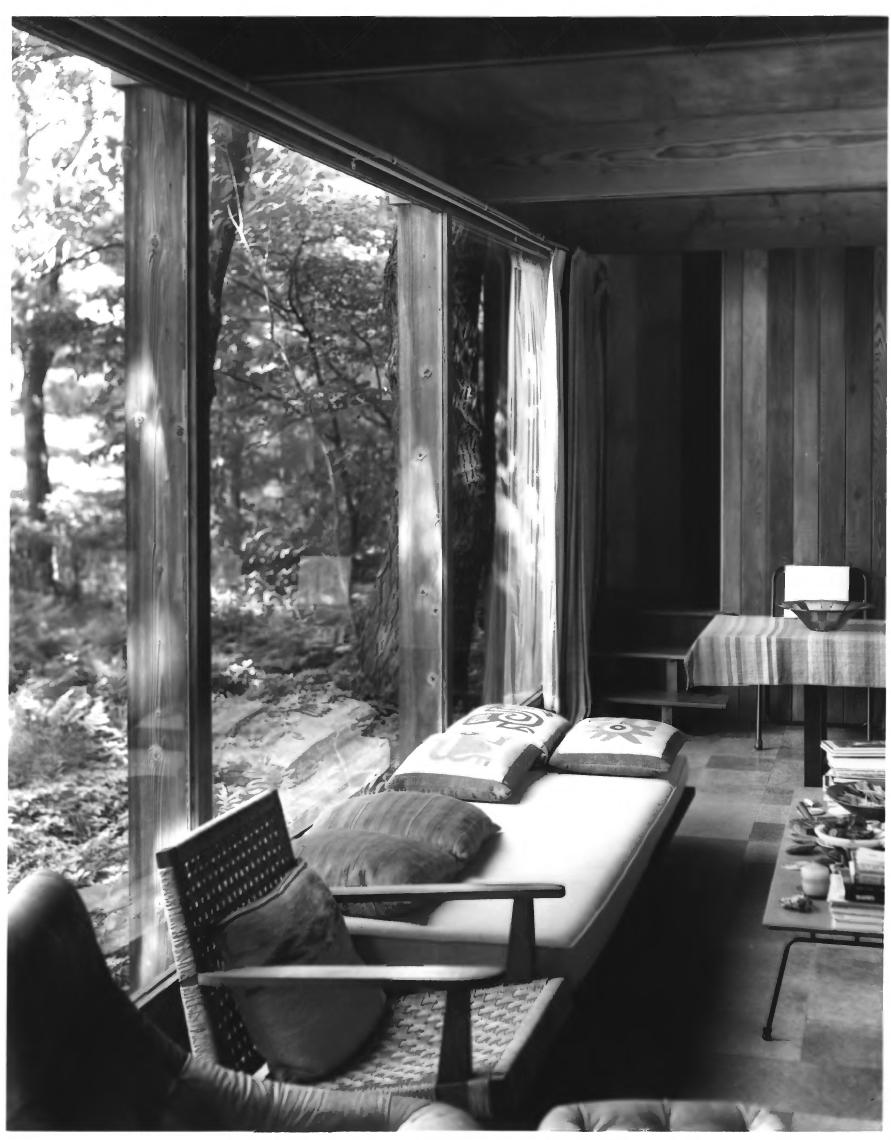
Living area of the Irme and Marie Horner House, Beverly Shores, Indiana.

The ground floor of the main house is finished almost entirely of natural, stained redwood. There are no painted surfaces. The ceilings are of birch plywood nailed directly to the rafters and were used as walls, to the studs. Cabinets of birch plywood are the only other non-redwood finishes. The floors are of 1/2", ground, consolidated cork tiles, one foot square, with a waxed finish. The stair treads to the second floor are white oak. The freestanding fireplace was designed to have two openings with a one-foot deep pit on the west side. Today the rear or second opening is unused. The chimney breast is of steel plate, with a plaster appliquéd, in a neutral gray finish. This surface presents an interesting texture. The fireplace is of tan brick. A second chimney leads from the gas furnace up through a chase behind the stairwell to the roof.

The compact, efficient kitchen utilizes white steel cabinets with grey sliding doors and clean white formica counter tops. All are original. An obscure glass pass-through serves both the living room and the screened porch. The interior of the main house is remarkable in that a great deal of ingenuity was employed in the utilization of space, in the design of cabinets, the efficient arrangement of utilities and furniture, even in the location of permanent lighting fixtures. The integrity of the interior is extremely high, with only slight changes having taken place since its construction. For example, an interior ventilation system, based on narrow, below-window hinged wooden panels, has been permanently closed and is rarely used today, but a workable transom survives over the front door and the south plate glass windows. The former are the only non-operable features in the house.

== Guest House ==
The other two structures, which comprise the residence, are detailed similarly to the main building, but they do not include any large paned (floor to ceiling) glass windows. The two story Guest House, 18 by 18 feet (5.5 m × 5.5 m) was originally designed as a one-room workshop. In 1965, a second story was added. It is quite sensitive to the architect f s design and maintains the footprint of the original plan. On the roof of the canopy, which connects the main house with the garage and the guest house (former workshop), a lightweight screened terrace was added. In addition, a timber frame was constructed on the north elevation of the guesthouse to provide a screened patio and outdoor shower.

== Garage ==
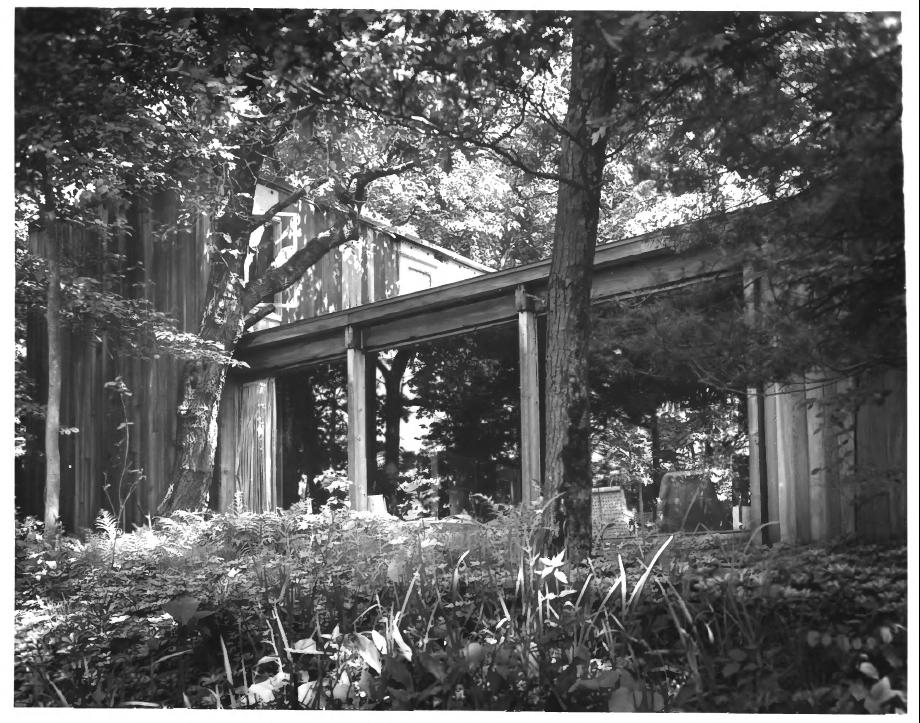
North face of the Irme and Marie Horner House, Beverly Shores, Indiana.

The garage is 18 by 22 feet (5.5 m × 6.7 m) with a south facing roll-up door. There is sufficient space for a full size hot water heater and a gas furnace. The building is equipped with a personnel door which gives onto the covered walk area between the three structures of the residence. The interior of the garage is finished with 4 by 8 feet (1.2 m × 2.4 m) plywood panels. The ceiling is of sheet rock, while the floor is concrete. Access to the garage from Merrivale Avenue is via a concrete drive/walkway, with a central median. The house and its supplemental buildings are connected with concrete walkways. These in turn, are covered with roofs. The only columniation is a single tree trunk near a fish tank. The canopies are all cantilevered from the adjacent buildings.

== Bibliography ==
- Bailey, Liberty Hyde, Hortus Third, A Concise Dictionary of Plants Cultivated in the United States and Canada, New York, Macmillan Pub. Co., 1976.
- Baily, E. Stillman, The Sand Dunes of Indiana, Chicago, A. C. McClung & Co., 1917.
- Ball, T. H., Northwestern Indiana from 1800 to 1900,..., Chicago, Donohue & Henneberg, 1900.
- Blake, Peter, Marcel Breuer: Architect and Designer, New York, Architectural Record/Museum of Modern Art, 1949.
- Boyden, Sarah, "The Indiana Dunes - A Wealth of Natural Wonders", Midwest Magazine, the Chicago Sun-Times, Chicago, June 30, 1963.
- Cressey, George Babcock, "The Indiana Sand Dunes and Shore Lines of the Michigan Basin", The Geographic Society of Chicago Bulletin #8, Chicago, Univ. of Chicago Press, 1928.
- Drury, John, This is Porter County, Indiana, 1956.
- Foster, Steven, Herbal Bounty!, The Gentle Art of Herb Culture, Salt Lake City, Utah, Peregrine Smith Books, 1986.
- Girschweiler, Von Heinz, "'Chicago-Kolb f im runden Wintergarten", Tages-Anzeiger Montag, (Region Zurich), Switzerland, 14, September, 1992.
- Goodyear, Frank H., Archaeological Site Science, New York, American Alsevier Pub. Co., 1971.
- Gruning, Christa & Michael, "Architekt und Designer Otto Kolb, Vom Ziegel zum Ting", in 50 Jahre Otto Kolb Design, MSS, Switzerland, 1992.
- Hatje, Gerd, Ed., Encyclopedia of Modern Architecture, New York, Harry N. Abrams, Inc., 1964,
- Historic Landmarks Foundation of Indiana, Porter County Interim Report, Indianapolis, Indiana, Division of Historic Preservation & Archaeology, 1991.
- Historic Landmarks Foundation of Indiana, LaPorte County Interim Report, Indianapolis, Indiana: Division of Historic Preservation & Archaeology, 1989.
- House in Indiana by Otto Kolb", Arts & Architecture, New York, October 1952.
- Joss, Liz, "Celebrated Houses Now in Danger", Indiana Preservationist, Mar /Apr., 1994.
- Kolb, Otto, Arch., "Casa Vicino al Lago", DOMUS, Milan, Italy, 1953.
- Kolb, Otto, Arch., "House in Beverly Shores, Indiana", AC1, International
- Asbestos -Cement Review, Zurich, Switzerland, Editions Girsberger, January 1956.
- Martin, Alexander C., Weeds, New York/ Racine WI, Golden Press/ Western Publishing Co, 1972.
- McAlester, Virginia and Lee, A Field Guide to American Houses, Alfred A. Knopf, New York, 1992.
- Ramsey, Charles George, Architectural Graphic Standards, Third Edition, New York, John Wiley & Sons, Inc., 1948.
- Storrer, William Allin, The Architecture of Frank Lloyd Wright, A complete catalog, Cambridge, MA, The MIT Press, 1989.
- Symonds, George W. D., The Tree Identification Book, New York, William Morrow, 1958.
- Taft, William G., Beverly Shores and the Development of the Modern Suburban Resort, Unpublished MSS, in library of Historic Landmarks Foundation of Indiana, Indianapolis, IN.
- "Vacation House Plans", Home Building Ideas for 1963, New York, Better Homes & Gardens., 1963.
- Whitford, Frank, Ed., The Bauhaus, Masters & Students by Themselves, London: Conran Octopus Ltd., 1992.
- Wolfe, Tom, From Bauhaus to Our House, New York, Farrar Straus Giroux, 1981.
- Ziehr, Dr. A., and Kolb, Otto, Das Einfamilien Hause, Switzerland, 1987.
