= Weller House (Chesterton, Indiana) =

Historic house in Indiana, United States

- U.S. National Register of Historic Places
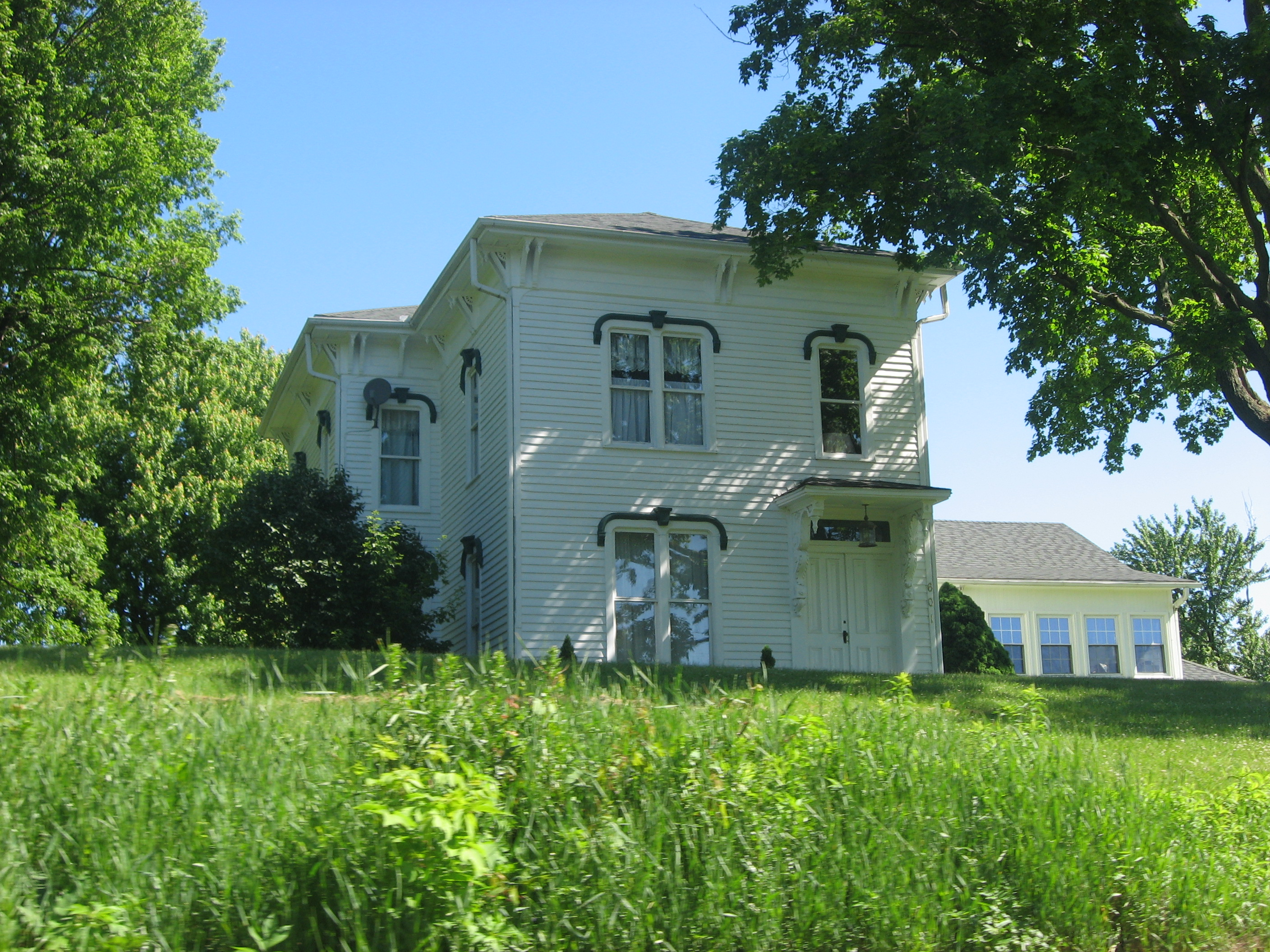
- Weller House, June 2013

- Location within Indiana Location within the United States
- Location: 1200 North Rd., east of Chesterton in Pine Township, Porter County, Indiana
- Coordinates: 41°36′26″N 86°57′4″W
- Area: less than one acre
- Built: 1870
- Architectural style: Italianate
- NRHP reference No.: 82000029
- Added to NRHP: April 22, 1982

Weller House, also known as The Old Prison Farm, is a historic home located in Pine Township, Porter County, Indiana. It was built about 1870, and is a two-story, rectangular, Italianate-style frame dwelling. It consists of a middle section flanked by projecting wings. The house features an entrance portico and round-cornered window frames.

It was listed on the National Register of Historic Places in 1982.

The Italianate house, sits on a knoll facing Burdick Road on 4.1 acres (1.7 ha), east of Chesterton. North of the house is a milk house and woodshed, and a large barn. To the northeast is a brick dormitory and a chicken coop. The two-story, frame, structure was built c. 1870. It is rectangular with a middle section and two projecting wings. A third wing was added on the east. It has a hipped roof, a characteristic of the Italianate style. Significant design features include the entrance portico, round-cornered window frames and sashes, and the arched hood moldings over most windows.

== Exterior ==
The house is built on a painted brick foundation. The main entrance is on the south side with a pair of windows to the east. A set of paired windows are to the west. The first floor windows are match on the second floor. A plain, wide frieze with brackets under the eaves support a hipped roof. The brick chimney is painted to the roof line.

A gable-roofed, enclosed entrance to the cellar is located in front of the central bay on the first floor of the north elevation. The wide frieze and brackets, which surround the entire house, are visible on the north side, as well. The north side of the east addition has a concrete foundation and concrete steps leading to a door. The one story, frame structure appears to have had a later porch, which is now removed.

== History ==
Built ca. 1870, the Weller House has outstanding details, including; round-cornered window frames, sashes, and hood moldings. A rope molding on the outside corners seldom occur in northwestern Indiana. Double brackets under the eaves is unusual as well.

Rosina Weller purchased the land in 1865. Upon her death in 1880, John C. and Charles E. Weller inherited the property. There were several owners in 1881, 1884, and 1901, until the State Department of Corrections in 1931. it was "Old Prison Farm" for 48 years to teach agricultural skills.
