= Ardmore Avenue station (Illinois) =

Ardmore Avenue
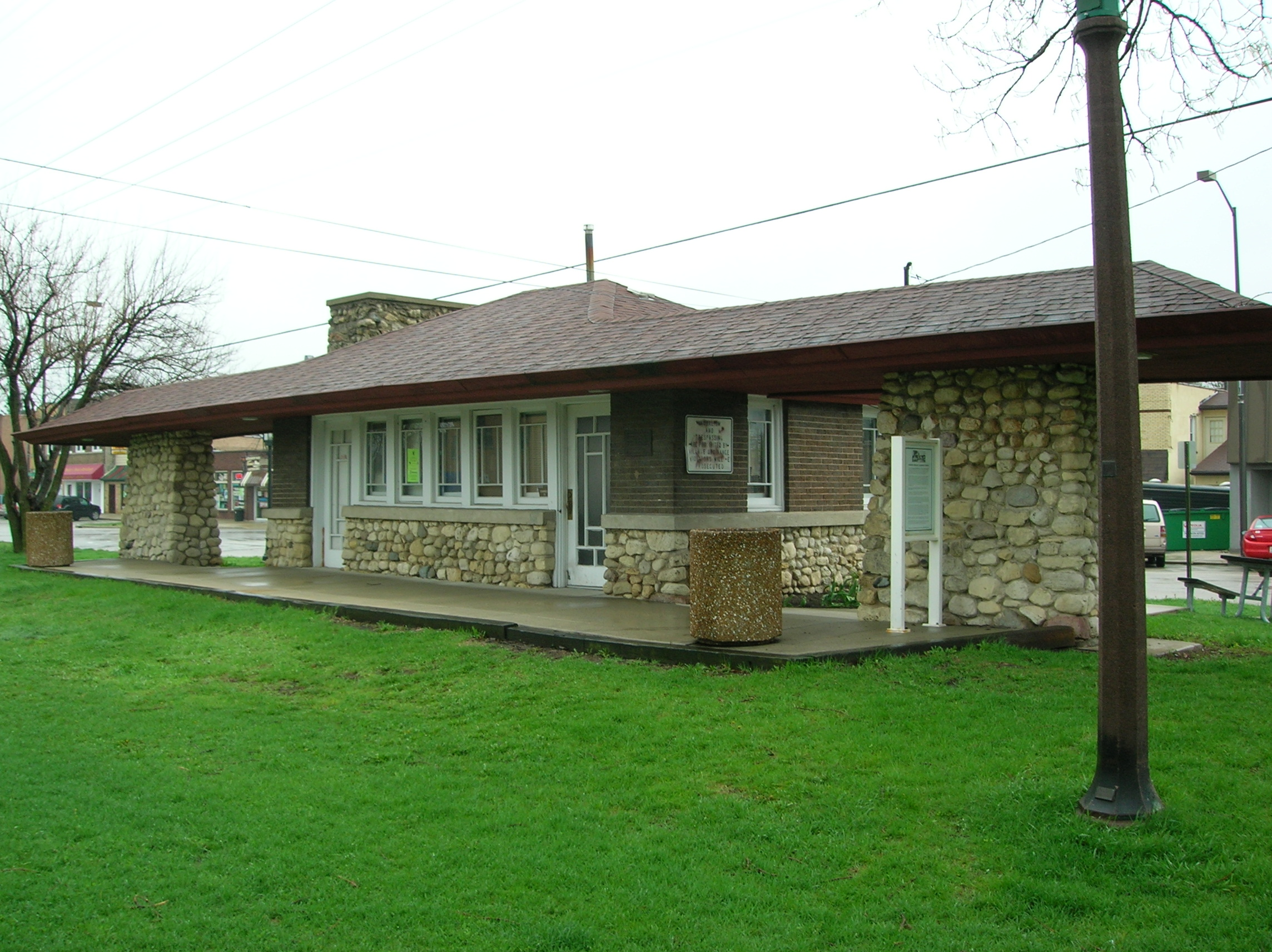
- The former Ardmore Avenue CA&E station

General information
- Location: 10 West Park Avenue; Villa Park, Illinois
- Coordinates: 41°53′0″N 87°58′46.5″W

History
- Opened: 1910; 116 years ago
- Closed: July 3, 1957; 69 years ago

Services
Preceding station	Chicago Aurora and Elgin Railroad	Following station
Westmore toward Wheaton	Main Line	Villa Avenue toward Chicago
- Ardmore Avenue Train Station
- U.S. National Register of Historic Places
- Architect: Ballard & Pottinger
- NRHP reference No.: 80004525
- Added to NRHP: November 21, 1980
Location

Ardmore Avenue station is (along with Villa Avenue station) one of two former Chicago Aurora and Elgin Railroad (CA&E) stations in Villa Park, Illinois. It was listed on the National Register of Historic Places in 1980 as Ardmore Avenue Train Station.

== History ==
The station is a stone-faced structure built in 1910 by the Ballard & Pottinger real estate firm. The station was erected to draw passengers to property that the firm was developing. The plan was successful, and enough people moved into the station vicinity to prompt incorporation as Villa Park in 1917. The station catered to passengers until July 3, 1957, when the CA&E abruptly shut down after years of financial losses. The Ardmore Avenue station is one of very few of what was once seventy-three railroad stations that served the CA&E. On November 21, 1980, it was listed on the National Register of Historic Places. Today, the station is the headquarters of the Villa Park Chamber of Commerce. The building now lies along the Illinois Prairie Path, a recreational path built along the former CA&E right-of-way.

== Architecture ==
The one story structure is built in an English motif and served mostly as a waiting shelter. Doors and windows are made of wood with steel lintels. The tile roof has galvanized iron gutters and a brick chimney. The building features a wood cornice. The station could be heated by a wood-burning fireplace and had electric lighting. Windows are found on all sides and two doors are on the north, leading to the platform. The interior was originally furnished with wood benches and flip-top seats.
