= Solomon Enclave =

Historic house in Indiana, United States

- U.S. National Register of Historic Places
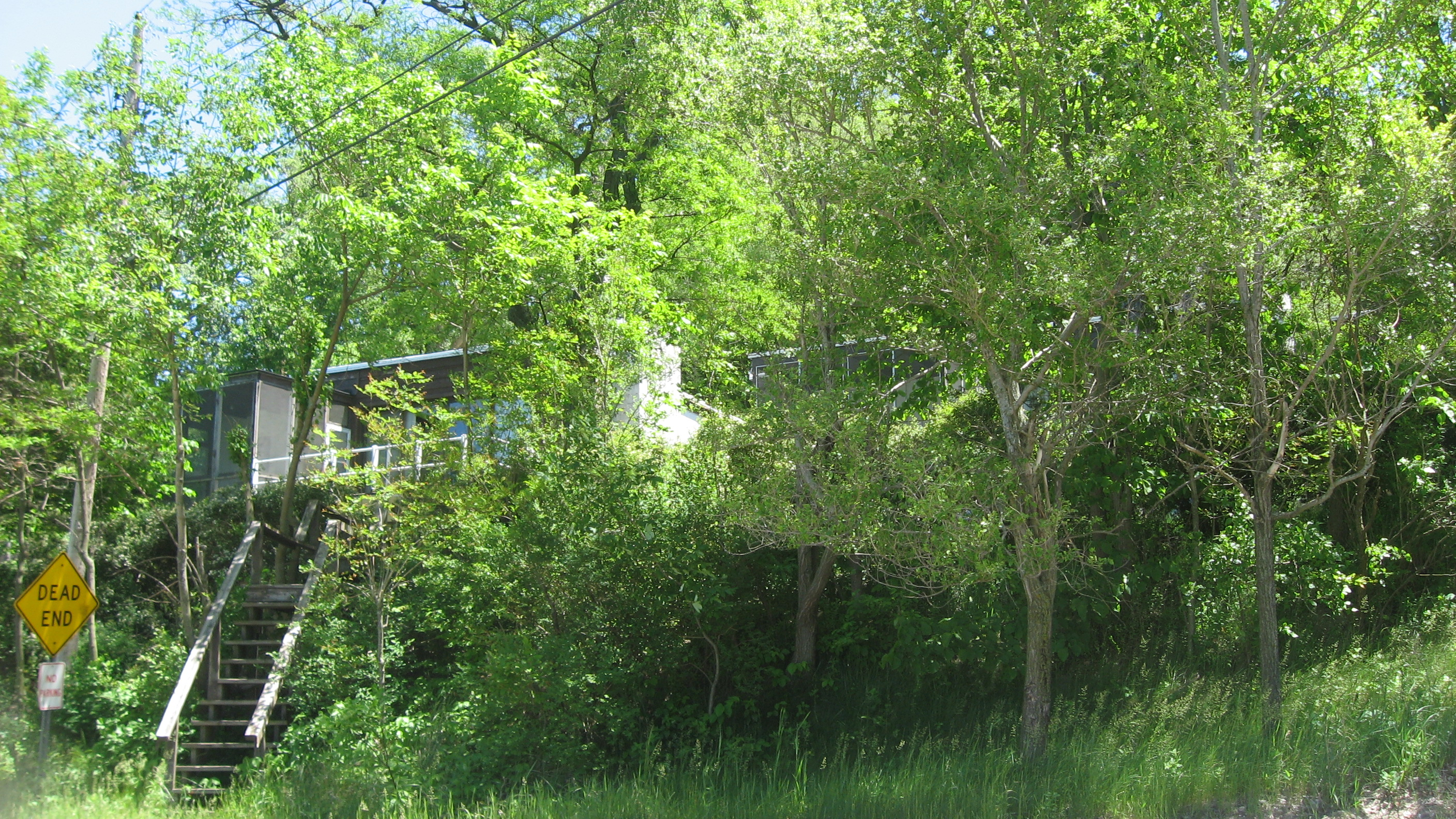
- House in Solomon Enclave, June 2013

- Location within Indiana Location within the United States
- Location: 901, 903, 907 E. Lake Front Dr., Beverly Shores, Indiana
- Coordinates: 41.69934°N 86.96222°W
- Area: 2.5 acres (1.0 ha)
- Built: 1948
- Architect: Solomon, Louis
- Architectural style: International Style
- NRHP reference No.: 11000220
- Added to NRHP: April 27, 2011

Solomon Enclave is three historic homes located at Beverly Shores, Indiana. The three two-story, International Style flat-roofed dwellings were built in 1948. They are rectangular in plan and are built into the sides of dunes. The houses features cantilevered concrete decks that overlook Lake Michigan.

It was listed on the National Register of Historic Places in 2011.
