= Pine Township, Porter County, Indiana =

Pine Township
- Township
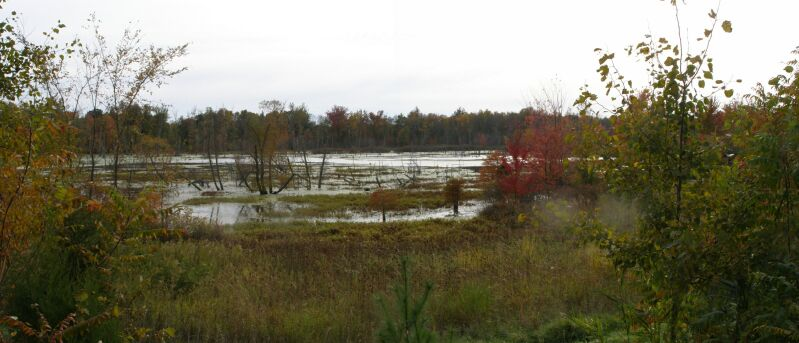
- Ponds form between ridges and high points

- Seal

- Coordinates: 41°39′17″N 86°58′13″W
- Country: United States
- State: Indiana
- County: Porter
- Organized: 1853

Government
  - Type: Indiana township

Area
  - Total: 29.06 sq mi (75.27 km^{2})
  - Land: 26.8 sq mi (69.4 km^{2})
  - Water: 2.27 sq mi (5.88 km^{2})
- Elevation: 650 ft (198 m)

Population (2020)
  - Total: 2,483
  - Density: 101.1/sq mi (39.03/km^{2})
- Time zone: UTC-6 (Central (CST))
  - Summer (DST): UTC-5 (CDT)
- Area code: 219
- FIPS code: 18-59922
- GNIS feature ID: 453739
- Website: www.pinetownshipin.org

Pine Township is one of twelve townships in Porter County, Indiana. As of the 2010 census, its population was 2,709. It is the least populated of the townships of Porter County.

Historical population
Census	Pop.	Note	%±
1890	596		—
1900	634		6.4%
1910	564		−11.0%
1920	468		−17.0%
1930	686		46.6%
1940	911		32.8%
1950	2,154		136.4%
1960	3,052		41.7%
1970	3,098		1.5%
1980	3,311		6.9%
1990	2,779		−16.1%
2000	2,853		2.7%
2010	2,709		−5.0%
2020	2,483		−8.3%

== History ==
Pine Township was organized in 1853, and named for the abundance of pine trees within its borders.

The Weller House was listed on the National Register of Historic Places in 1982.

== Cities and towns ==
Pine Township includes the communities of Beverly Shores and Town of Pines.

== Education ==
The township is mostly served by the Michigan City Area Schools. Its high school is Michigan City High School located in Michigan City, LaPorte County, Indiana. The rest of the township is served by the Duneland School Corporation.

== Parks ==
Pine Township includes the eastern portion of Indiana Dunes National Park, including beaches in the town of Beverly Shores.
