= Villa Avenue station =

Train station in Villa Park, Illinois, US

Villa Avenue
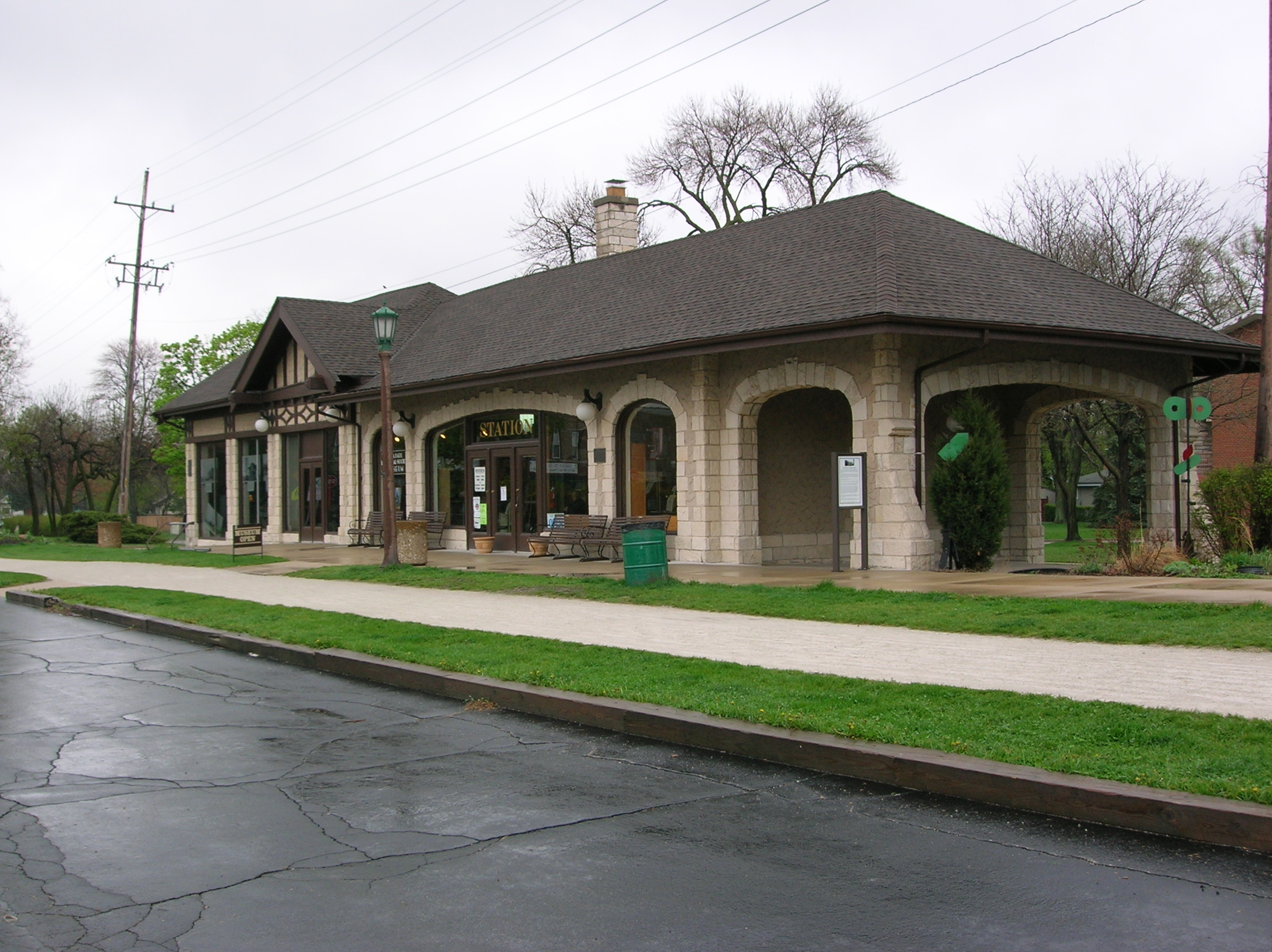
- Villa Avenue's former CA&E station

General information
- Location: 220 South Villa Avenue; Villa Park, Illinois
- Coordinates: 41°53′8.5″N 87°58′10″W

History
- Opened: 1929; 97 years ago
- Closed: July 3, 1957; 69 years ago

Services
Preceding station	Chicago Aurora and Elgin Railroad	Following station
Ardmore Avenue toward Wheaton	Main Line	Spring Road toward Chicago
- Villa Avenue Train Station
- U.S. National Register of Historic Places
- Architectural style: Tudor Revival
- NRHP reference No.: 86001480
- Added to NRHP: August 22, 1986
Location

The Villa Avenue Train Station is one of two former Chicago Aurora and Elgin Railroad (CA&E) stations in Villa Park, Illinois. The building was also used as an office by the Western United Gas and Electric Company. Listed on the National Register of Historic Places in 1986, it is now the home of the Villa Park Historical Society Museum.

== History ==
The station is a Tudor Revival structure built between August and November 1929. The station replaced two smaller waiting rooms on the east side of Villa Park. The western portion of the station served passengers, while the eastern portion functioned as a Western United Gas and Electric Company office. Both the railroad and the utility company were owned by utilities mogul Samuel Insull. Realtors Ballard & Pottinger would offer free railway trips to the station on Sundays to show off properties in the local region. The station was across the street from the American Ovaltine factory, the largest employer in the village. Villa Park eventually became the largest commuter customer for the railroad. Villa Avenue Train Station closed on July 3, 1957, due to the decline of the CA&E. On August 22, 1986, it was listed on the National Register of Historic Places. Today the station is the headquarters of the Villa Park Historical Society Museum. It is one of only four CA&E stations still standing. Today it is found along the Illinois Prairie Path, which was constructed along the former CA&E right-of-way.

== Architecture ==
The building was designed by Arthur U. Gerber, staff-architect of Samuel Insull who owned the CA&E at the time. The single-story building is rectangular, measuring 28 by 104 feet (8.5 m × 31.7 m). A gable roof covers the waiting room section and the portico. The roof includes a limestone chimney and synthetic shingles. Window and door frames are made of wood. Walls are built with wood, stucco and limestone. The southern elevation features a 4-foot (1.2 m) limestone wall topped with two rows of limestone blocks. The western portion includes a stone-arched window with mullioned casements. The eastern half has three high square windows. The three gables are half-timbered and stuccoed.

== See also ==
- Ardmore Avenue Train Station, another surviving CA&E station in Villa Park
