= Beverly Shores station =

South Shore Line station in Indiana

Beverly Shores
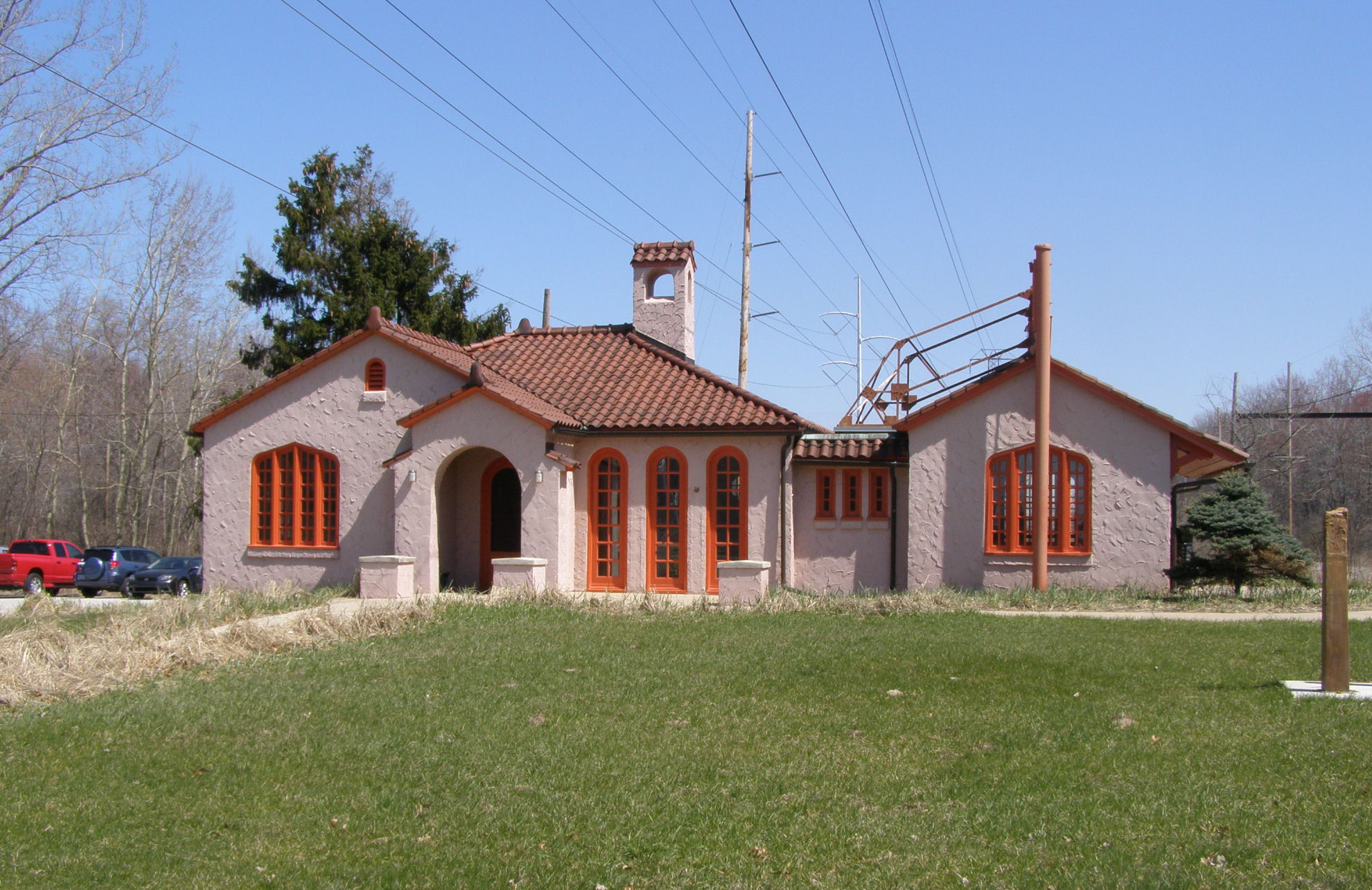

General information
- Location: Broadway Avenue and US 12, Beverly Shores, Indiana
- Owner: NICTD
- Platforms: 2 side platforms
- Tracks: 2
- Connections: Calumet Trail

Construction
- Parking: Yes
- Cycle facilities: Yes
- Accessible: Yes

Other information
- Fare zone: 7

Passengers
- 2019: 47 (average weekday)

Services
Preceding station	NICTD	Following station
Dune Park toward Millennium Station	Lakeshore Corridor	11th Street toward South Bend International Airport
Former services
Preceding station	NICTD	Following station
Kemil Road Closed 1994 toward Randolph Street	South Shore Line	Willard Avenue Closed 1994 toward South Bend Airport
- Beverly Shores South; Shore Railroad Station
- U.S. National Register of Historic Places
- Interactive map highlighting the station
- Coordinates: 41°40′24″N 86°59′9″W
- Built: 1929
- Architect: Arthur U. Gerber; Leo W. Post
- Architectural style: Mediterranean Revival
- NRHP reference No.: 89000411
- Added to NRHP: July 19, 1989
Track layout
Location

Beverly Shores is a train station in Beverly Shores, Indiana, served by the South Shore Line interurban commuter railroad. The station serves the town of Beverly Shores as well as the nearby Town of Pines. It is a flag stop.

== Architecture ==
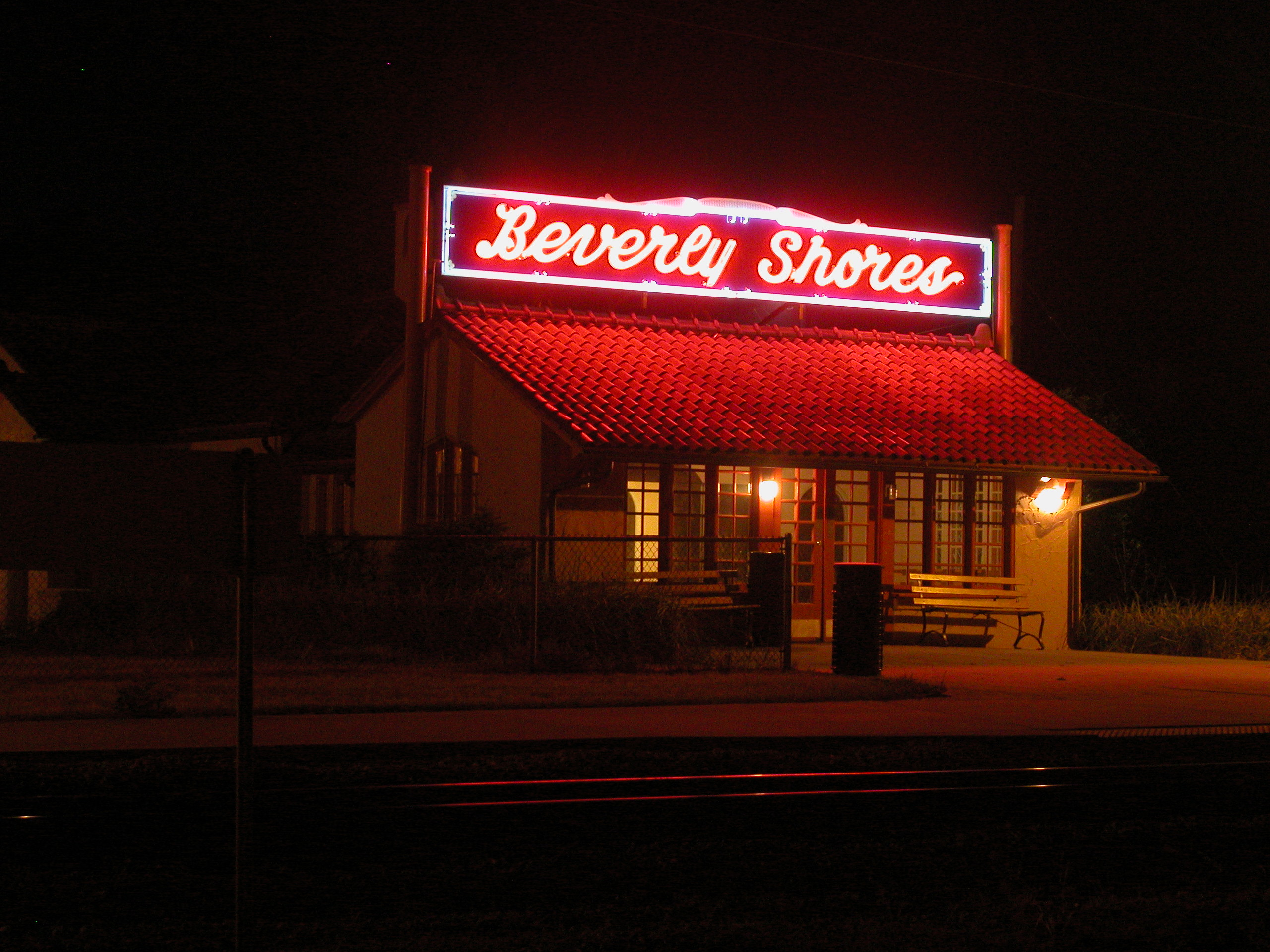
Station neon signage at night.

This is one of eleven such stations built along Insull lines, which included the Chicago North Shore and Milwaukee line. Of the eleven, only this station and the North Shore Line's Briergate station still exist. The Mediterranean Revival style was used for a series of buildings adjacent to the station, including the Bartlett Real Estate Office.

Beverly Shores station is one of the last two examples of the "Insull Spanish" architecture style used for station houses along the electric railroad lines acquired by Samuel Insull in the first part of the twentieth century. The other is in Highland Park, IL, with the Briergate station but it is threatened with demolition. It was a Mediterranean Revival style designed by Insull's staff-architect, Arthur U. Gerber. The station is served by daily passenger trains of the South Shore Line. Although freight trains pass daily in either direction, no freight service is offered from this location. The station housed an agent, Nellie Warren, and her husband at one time. This section is now an art gallery. The most notable characteristic of the station, aside from the Spanish style, is the large neon sign reading "Beverly Shores".

The station house is located north of the track. There is a rudimentary paved platform structure directly in front of it. A small parking lot is located right behind the depot.

== History ==
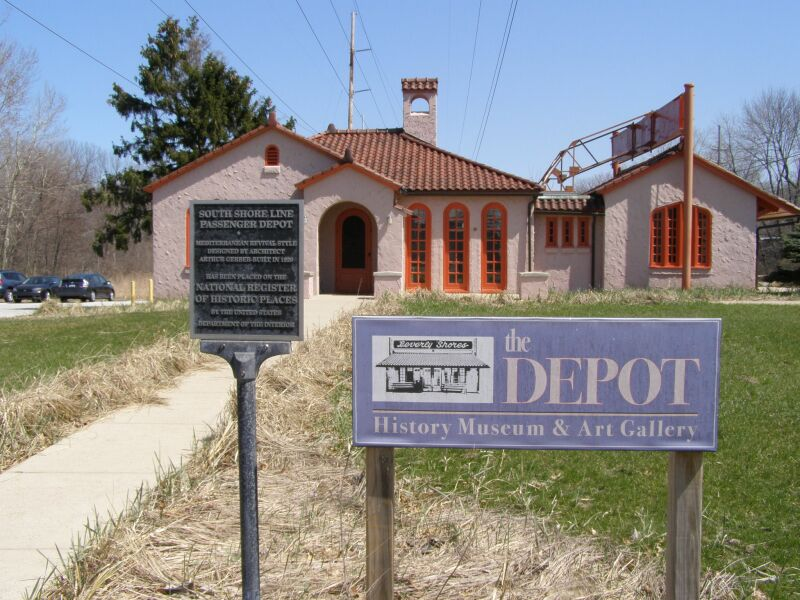
Side view with sign for art museum, and NRHP plaque.

The South Shore Line began in 1901 as the Chicago and Indiana Air Line Railway. It was incorporated in 1925, when several stations were added, including the Beverly Shores Station at Broadway and another at Central Avenue. The station was designed by architect Arthur Gerber and built by Leo W. Post in 1929 as a mirror image of the Lake Shore station built two years earlier and demolished in the 1970s.

The Beverly Shores station replaced an earlier structure serving the developing resort community of Beverly Shores on Lake Michigan. This is the last unaltered Insull Spanish style structure of the nine built on Samuel Insull's South and North Shore Lines. It still serves the 88-mile long South Shore Line, the last of the electric interurban railway systems. This station typifies Insull's interurban routes; it is the best representative of the South Shore Line's history.

Before 1946, a large neon sign was added to the roof. The sign is owned by the town of Beverly Shores and leased to the railroad until November 2034. The land is owned by the Northern Indiana Public Service Company (NIPSCO), who leases it to the railroad on a 99-year lease that began in August 1929. The building is owned by the South Shore Railroad.

On July 19, 1989, the Beverly Shores station was added to the National Register of Historic Places.

=== Improvements in 2021–2023 ===
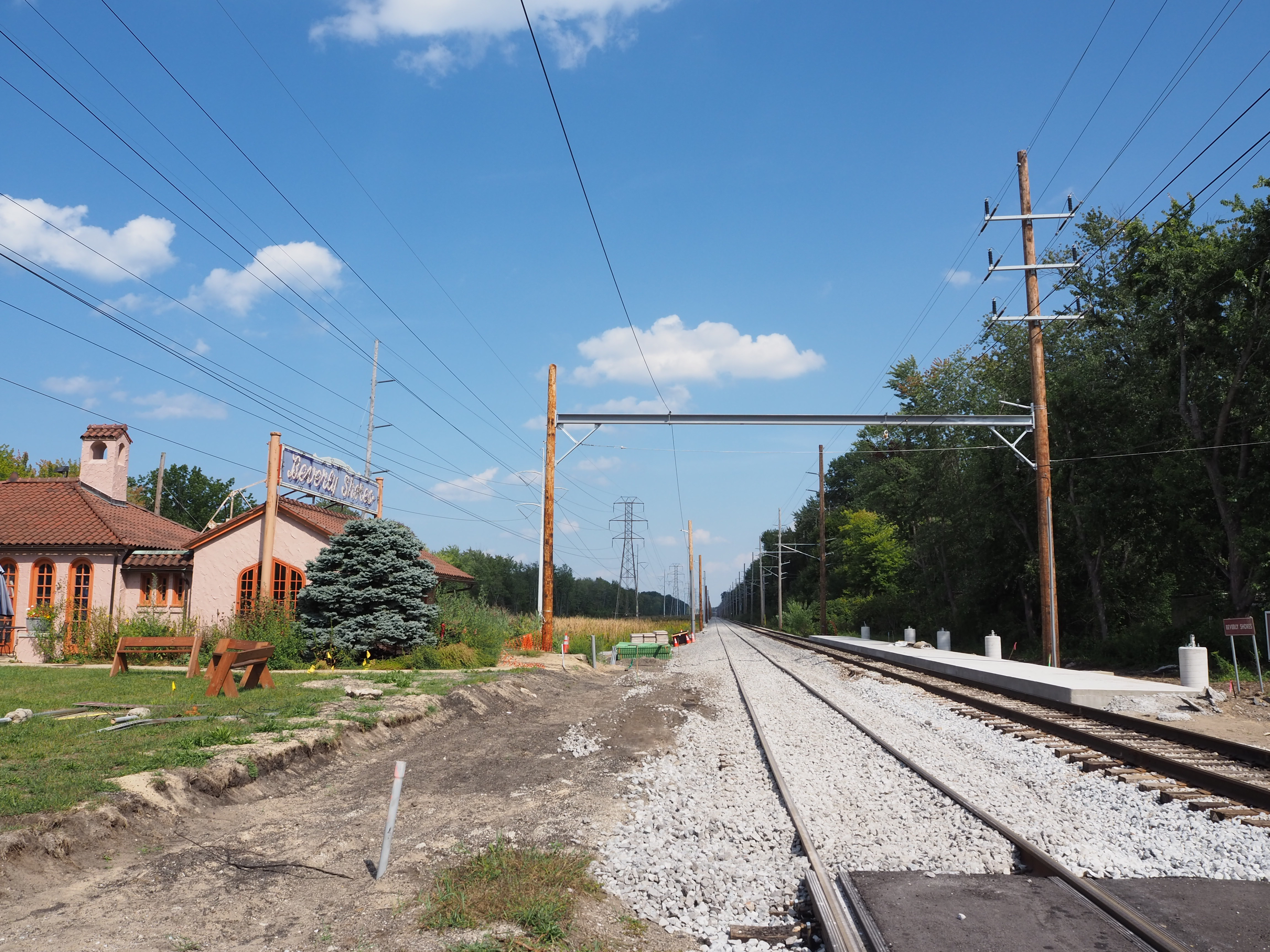
Second track and platform under construction in September 2022

As part of a larger project to double-track the South Shore Line from Gary to Michigan City, Beverly Shores received a second track and a second platform. While some other stations received major renovations as part of the project, Beverly Shores only saw a new low-level platform to accommodate the second track, while the parking and station building remained unchanged. The rebuilt platforms reopened on October 25, 2023.
