= Town of Pines, Indiana =

- Town
- Logo
- Motto: "Door Step to Mount Baldy"
- Location of Town of Pines in Porter County, Indiana.
- Coordinates: 41°41′18″N 86°57′06″W
- Country: United States
- State: Indiana
- County: Porter
- Township: Pine

Area
  - Total: 2.25 sq mi (5.84 km^{2})
  - Land: 2.25 sq mi (5.84 km^{2})
  - Water: 0 sq mi (0.00 km^{2})
- Elevation: 614 ft (187 m)

Population (2020)
  - Total: 594
  - Density: 263.4/sq mi (101.71/km^{2})
- Time zone: UTC-6 (Central (CST))
  - Summer (DST): UTC-5 (CDT)
- ZIP code: 46360
- FIPS code: 18-76256
- GNIS feature ID: 2397698
- Website: www.townofpines.net

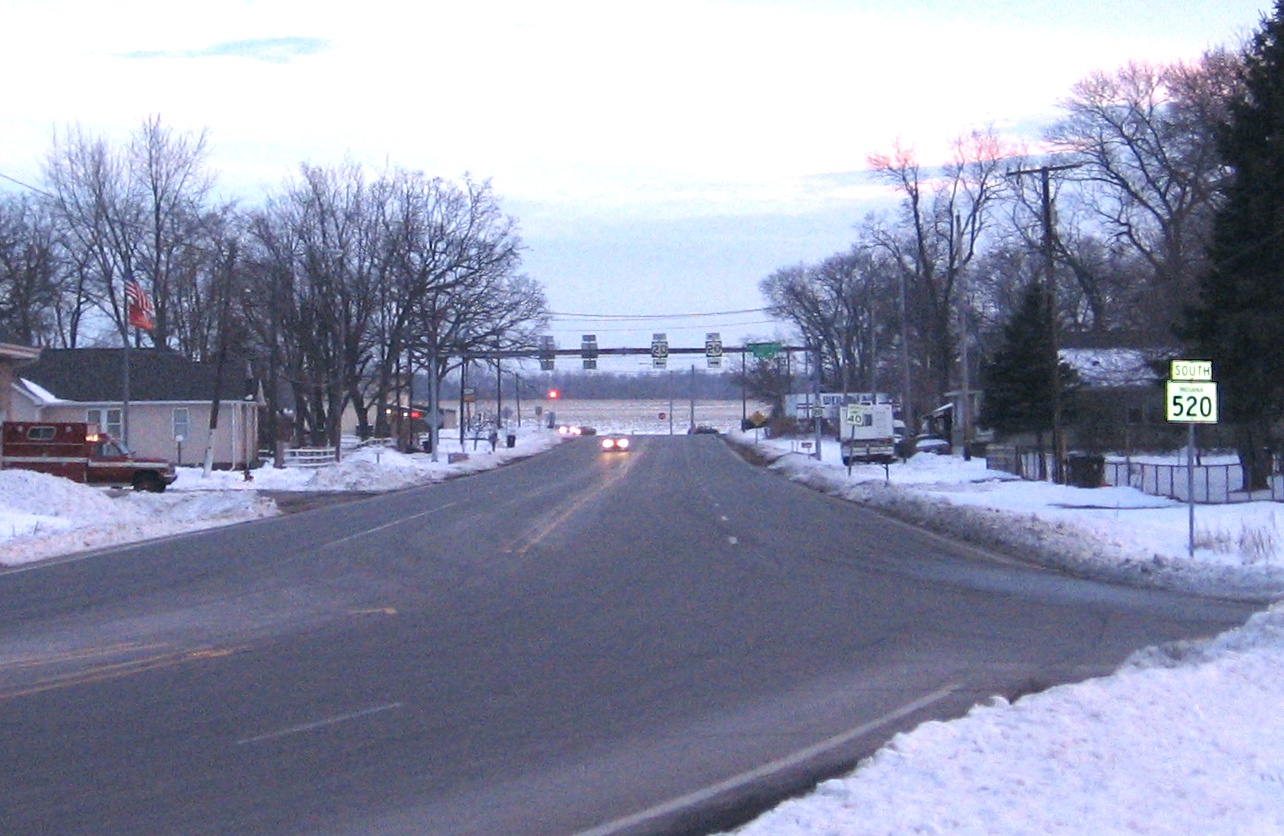
Pines is the home to the shortest named highway in the state, Indiana State Road 520, seen here looking south from its intersection with U.S. Route 12.

Town of Pines is a town in Pine Township, Porter County, in the U.S. state of Indiana. The population was 594 as of the 2020 census.

== Geography ==
Town of Pines is located near Lake Michigan and adjacent to the Indiana Dunes National Park.

According to the 2010 census, Town of Pines has a total area of 2.25 square miles (5.83 km^{2}), all land.

== Demographics ==
Historical population
Census	Pop.	Note	%±
1960	939		—
1970	1,007		7.2%
1980	962		−4.5%
1990	789		−18.0%
2000	798		1.1%
2010	708		−11.3%
2020	594		−16.1%
U.S. Decennial Census

=== 2010 census ===
As of the census of 2010, there were 708 people, 302 households, and 184 families living in the town. The population density was 313.3 inhabitants per square mile (121.0/km^{2}). There were 353 housing units at an average density of 156.2 per square mile (60.3/km^{2}). The racial makeup of the town was 93.9% White, 2.3% African American, 0.4% Native American, 0.3% Asian, 0.1% from other races, and 3.0% from two or more races. Hispanic or Latino of any race were 3.1% of the population.

There were 302 households, of which 21.9% had children under the age of 18 living with them, 46.0% were married couples living together, 10.6% had a female householder with no husband present, 4.3% had a male householder with no wife present, and 39.1% were non-families. 31.1% of all households were made up of individuals, and 9.9% had someone living alone who was 65 years of age or older. The average household size was 2.34 and the average family size was 2.94.

The median age in the town was 45.3 years. 18.8% of residents were under the age of 18; 6.6% were between the ages of 18 and 24; 24.2% were from 25 to 44; 36% were from 45 to 64; and 14.5% were 65 years of age or older. The gender makeup of the town was 50.4% male and 49.6% female.

=== 2000 census ===
As of the census of 2000, there were 798 people, 332 households, and 226 families living in the town. The population density was 350.5 inhabitants per square mile (135.3/km^{2}). There were 360 housing units at an average density of 158.1 per square mile (61.0/km^{2}). The racial makeup of the town was 96.24% White, 0.13% African American, 1.38% Native American, 0.50% Asian, 0.13% from other races, and 1.63% from two or more races. Hispanic or Latino of any race were 2.13% of the population.

There were 332 households, out of which 27.1% had children under the age of 18 living with them, 56.0% were married couples living together, 7.8% had a female householder with no husband present, and 31.9% were non-families. 26.8% of all households were made up of individuals, and 6.9% had someone living alone who was 65 years of age or older. The average household size was 2.40 and the average family size was 2.92.

In the town, the population was spread out, with 20.7% under the age of 18, 8.6% from 18 to 24, 30.1% from 25 to 44, 29.6% from 45 to 64, and 11.0% who were 65 years of age or older. The median age was 40 years. For every 100 females, there were 108.9 males. For every 100 females age 18 and over, there were 110.3 males.

The median income for a household in the town was $41,875, and the median income for a family was $47,143. Males had a median income of $41,000 versus $22,969 for females. The per capita income for the town was $19,856. About 4.6% of families and 8.7% of the population were below the poverty line, including 11.8% of those under age 18 and 14.9% of those age 65 or over.

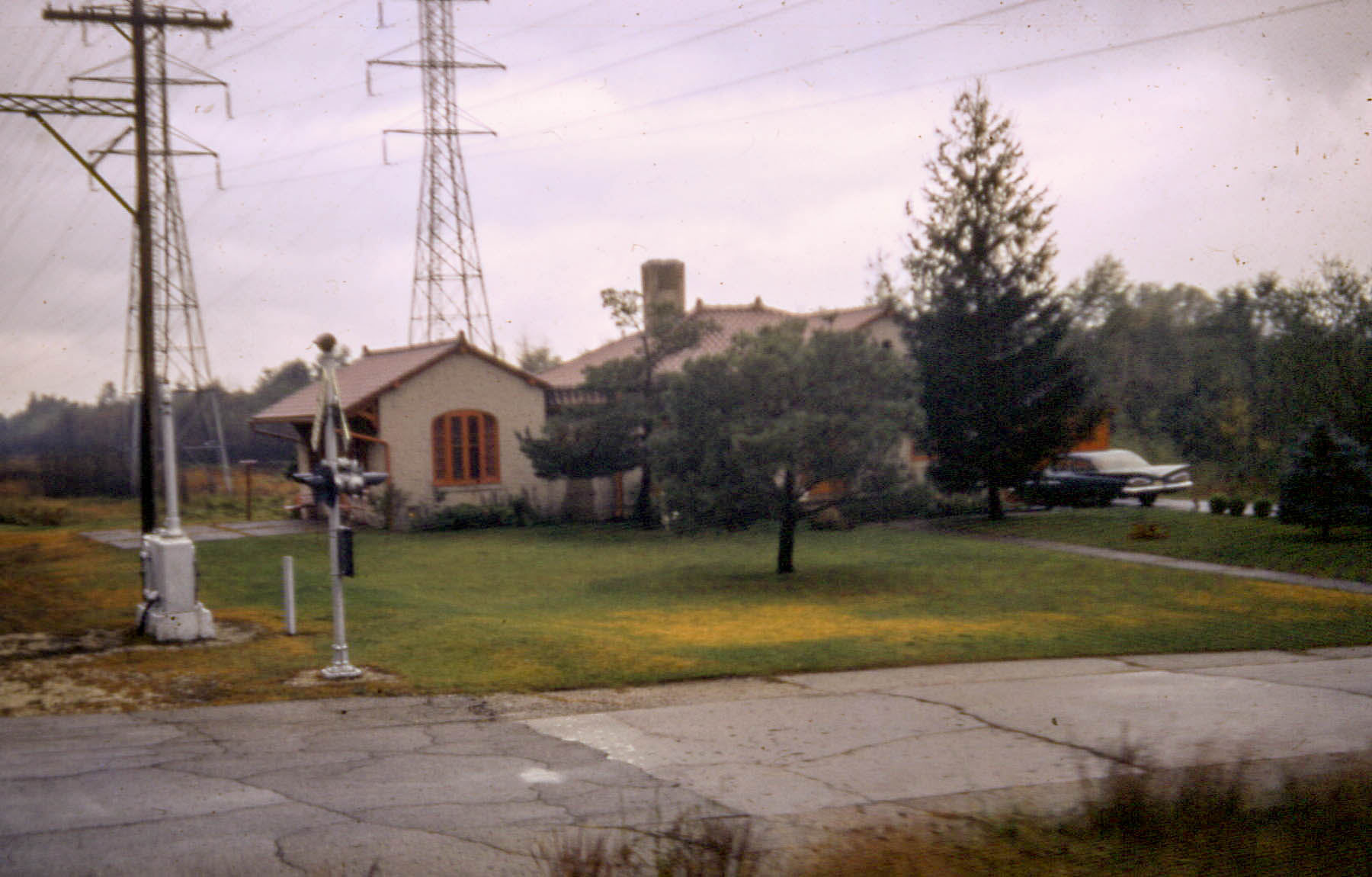
Lake Shore station of the South Shore Line, also known as Pines station (1967)

== Transportation ==
Town of Pines is the home of Indiana State Road 520, a 0.2-mile-long (0.32-kilometer) state highway connecting U.S. Highway 12 to U.S. Highway 20. It is the shortest state highway in Indiana.

The Central Avenue station of the South Shore Line, also known as Pines station, served Town of Pines from 1927 until its demolition in the 1970s.

== Education ==
The school district is Michigan City Area Schools. For this municipality, the zoned elementary school is Pine Elementary School, and the zoned middle school is Barker Middle School. Michigan City High School is the district's sole comprehensive high school.
