= Valparaiso Downtown Commercial District =

Historic district in Indiana, United States

- U.S. National Register of Historic Places
- U.S. Historic district
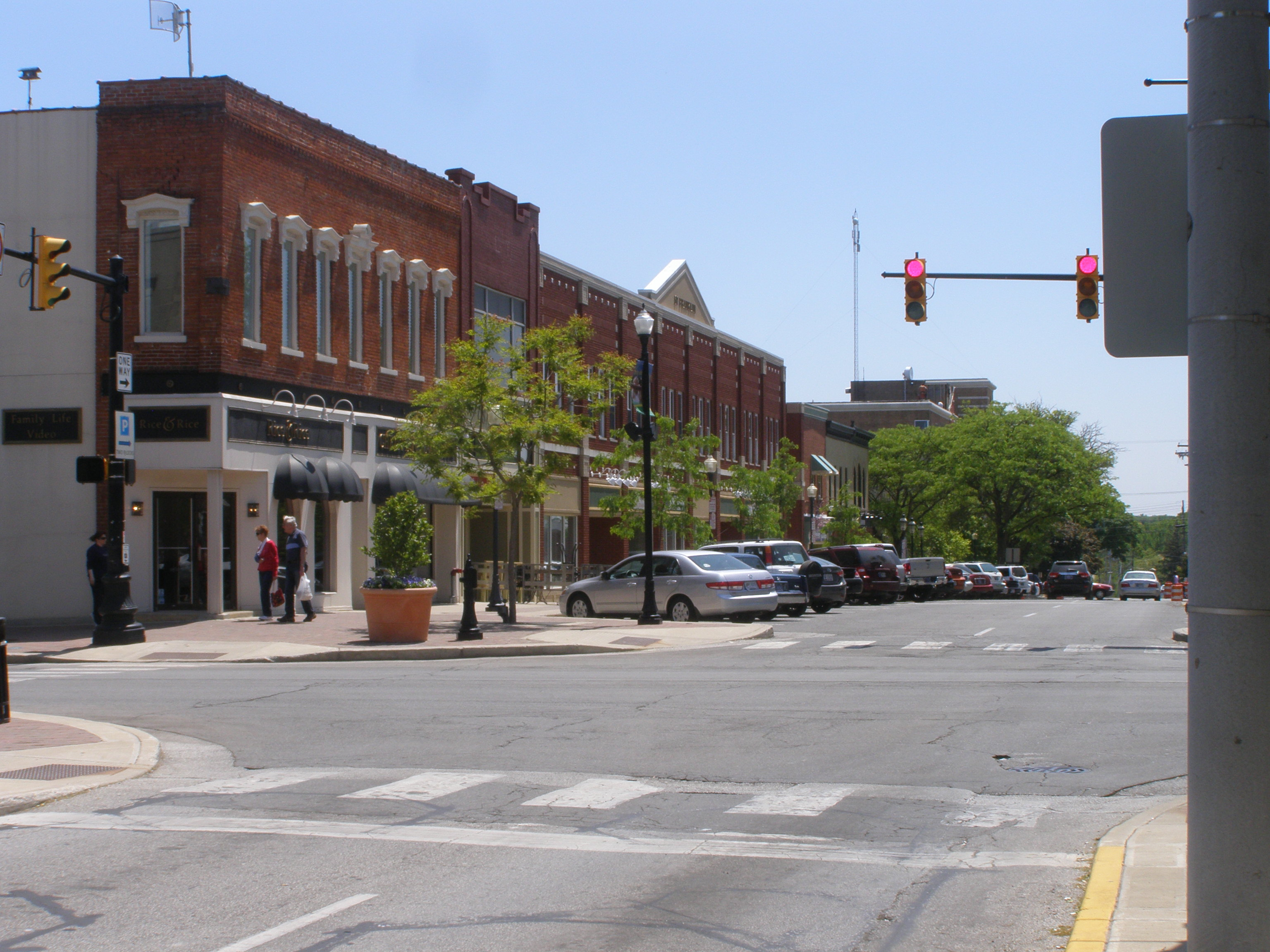
- Franklin east of Courthouse

- Location within Indiana Location within the United States
- Location: Roughly bounded by Jefferson, Morgan, Indiana, and Napoleon, Valparaiso, Indiana
- Coordinates: 41°28′3″N 87°3′36″W
- Area: 14 acres (5.7 ha)
- Architect: Multiple
- Architectural style: Italianate, Commercial Style
- NRHP reference No.: 90000327
- Added to NRHP: February 23, 1990

Valparaiso has retained an active downtown. It remains a mix of government, retail and business center, with a mixed residential and service area (retail and restaurants). Numerous economic changes have not changed the basic character, historic courthouse area. The historic district retains the distinctive turn-of-the-19th-century architecture, supporting numerous small specialty shops, shaded sidewalks, and a people friendly environment. The Downtown District, is anchored on the Porter County Courthouse. It includes 14-blocks surrounding the square, bounded on the north by Jefferson Street, on the east by Morgan Street, on the south by Monroe Street, and on the west by Napoleon Street.

== History ==
The Portersville Land Company platted the town of Portersville in 1836. The next year, the town was renamed in honor of Commodore David Porter’s last battle outside the Chilean port of Valparaíso. The County had been named in honor of Commodore Porter. The first building were constructed near the Morgan Street bridge (corner of Morgan Street and Lincolnway). The town did not begin to grow until 1850, when the first railroad was completed through town.

The first courthouse was completed in 1837. This frame structure was replaced in 1852, and again in 1885 with a limestone structure. The current courthouse is the 1885 structure, restored after the 1934 fire, which destroyed the distinctive clock tower. The county jail was located on Mechanic Street (Indiana Street today). The log building was replaced in 1871 with a modern limestone building. It was attached to the Sheriff’s residence, which had been built 11 years earlier.

Public programs were held in the Grand Opera House when it opened in 1874. Originally known as the Fiske Opera House, it was the first public space in Valparaiso. The first floor was retail space and the second floor could hold up to 700 people. In 1893 the Memorial Hall was built to honor Civil War Veterans and could hold an audience of 1,000.

== Significant structures ==
All structures are historically contributing towards the Historic District Status, unless otherwise noted. An ‘O’ rating signifies that the structure had enough historic or architectural significance to be considered for individual listing in the National Register of Historic Places. The ‘N’ rating signifies that the structure is above average and may, with further investigation be eligible for an individual listing. The ‘C’ or contributing rating signifies that the structure meet the basic inventory qualifications, but fails to meet individual merit, but in combination with other closely placed similar structures warrants inclusion in an historic district.

=== West Lincolnway ===
- 170: Valparaiso Post Office; Neoclassical, 1917 (James A. Wetmore, architect) (O)
  - This Neoclassical structure was designed by the Office of the Supervising Architect under James A. Wetmore, and opened in 1919 as the U.S. Post Office. The design creates a monumental effect with the building back from the sidewalk, a flight of stairs to the entrance, which is in the middle of the facade between two-story, freestanding, Tuscan pillars. The City purchased the building in 1987 to renovate for use as the City Hall.*162: Grand Opera House; Italianate, 1871-1874 (C)
- 162: Grand Opera House (Odd Fellows Building); Italianate, 1871-1874 (C)
  - The earliest venue for the performing arts in Valparaiso as the Fisk Opera House. The auditorium on the upper floor could hold 700 people. Until the Memorial Opera House was built in 1893, this was the only center for theater. Designed for one or two businesses at street level, the elongated windows of the second floor reveal the presence of a high ceiled the vaudeville theater on the upper floor.
- 150: Elks Temple; Colonial Revival, 1924 (Whetherhogg, Architect) (O)
  - The Fisk Block stood on this site as the home of the Elks until it burned in 1924. The Elks rebuilt their home as a Colonial Revival building designed by Mr. Whetherfogg. It has a canopied formal entry on Lafayette St. to the upper floors. Major renovation in 1988 created the 150 Lincolnway facilities. The Elks have since sold their interests in the building.
- 70: Commercial Building; Italianate, c.1880 (N)
- 68: Commercial Building; Italianate, c.1880 (N)
- 66-64: Commercial Building; Italianate, c.1880 (N)
- 62: Horn's Block; 20th Century Functional, 1921 (C)
- 60: Horn's Block; 20th Century Functional, 1921 (C)
- 58: Post Tribune Building; 19th Century Functional, c.1870 (C)

=== East Lincolnway ===
- 101: Farmer's State Bank; Neoclassical, 1927 (Frederic Beck, architect) (N)
  - In 1926, Farmer's State Bank purchased 44 feet (13 m) of Specht, Finney, Skinner building on the corner of Franklin St. and Main St., i.e.; Lincolnway. Frederick Beck designed the Renaissance palace facade of Indiana Limestone and sandstone. The main entrance on the south has a two-story glazed arch entry way with Ionic pilasters on each side. Additional features on the Franklin St. side exhibit Art Deco Styling. In the 1980s, the new owner, Northern Indiana Bank, added the neighboring property, the remains of the Specht, Finney, Skinner Store on the east for additional banking services. Banking consolidation of the 1990s and early 21st Century has seen the building changing ownership. It remains a downtown bank.

=== Courthouse Square ===
- Porter County Courthouse; Second Empire/Neoclassical, 1885/1934 (John C. Cochrane, 1885, architect; John D. Wilson, 1934, architect) (N)

=== West Indiana ===
- 14: First State Bank of Valparaiso; Neoclassical, 1903 (Jenny and Mundie, architect) (N)
  - The Neoclassical architecture was a common style for banks, meant to imply wisdom and a sense of security. The firm of Jenny and Mundie designed the structure using Indiana Limestone When constructed, this restrained monumental temple front gave a new face to an older structure. Tuscan pillars on waist-high pedestals echo the Courthouse porch across the street, and create a three part facade. Later the bank was operated as the First National Bank and has undergone numerous changes in ownership during the bank consolidations of the 1990s and early 21st Century.
- 102: Sheriff's Residence, Italianate, 1860 (O)
- Porter County Jail, 1871, (R. Rose, architect; Shade and Lembke, builders ) (O) NR
- 104: Memorial Hall, Romanesque Revival, 1893 Charles Lembke, architect) (O) NR

== Gallery ==
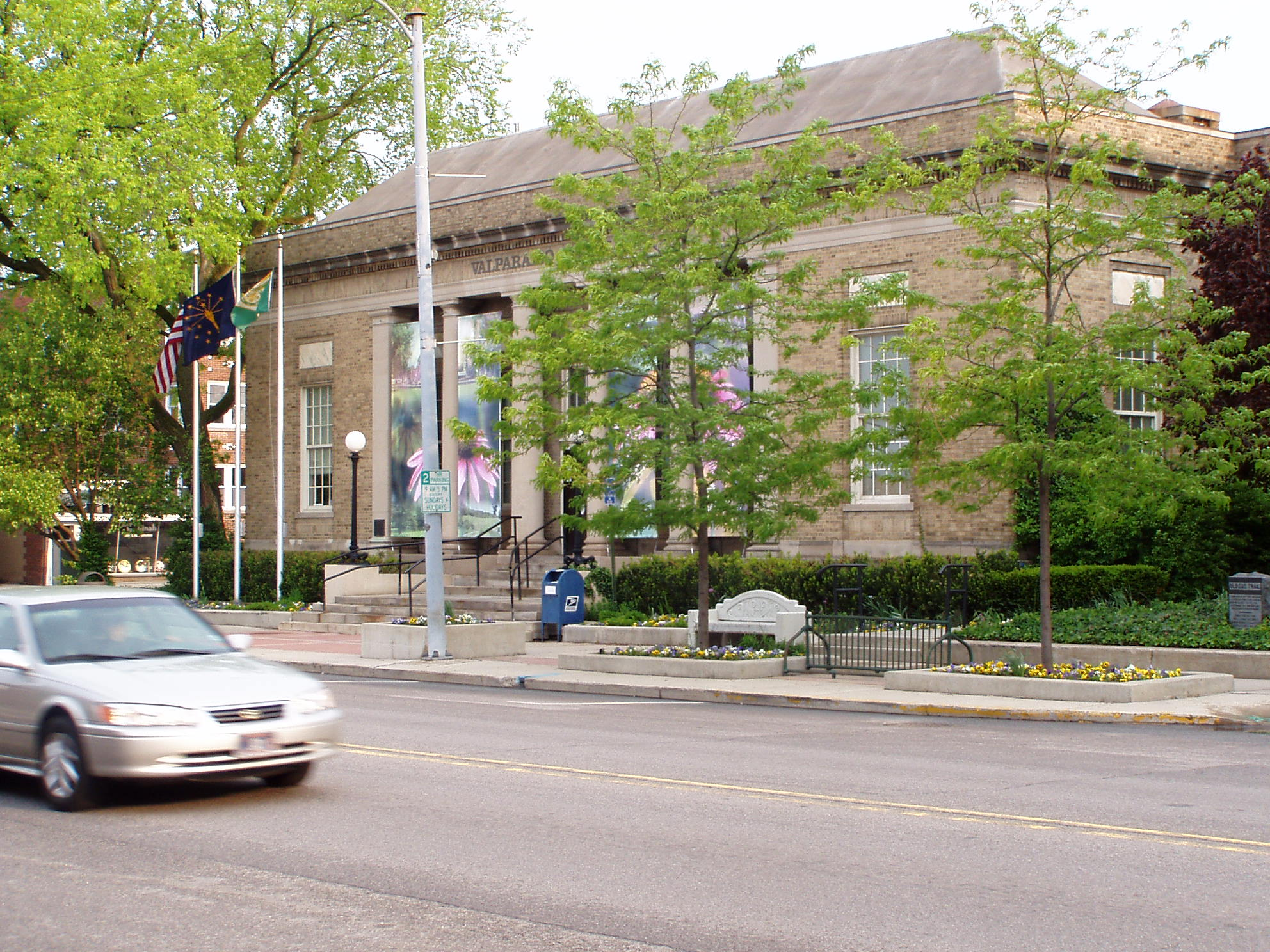
Valparaiso Post Office; Neoclassical, 1917 (Valparaiso City Hall in 2015)

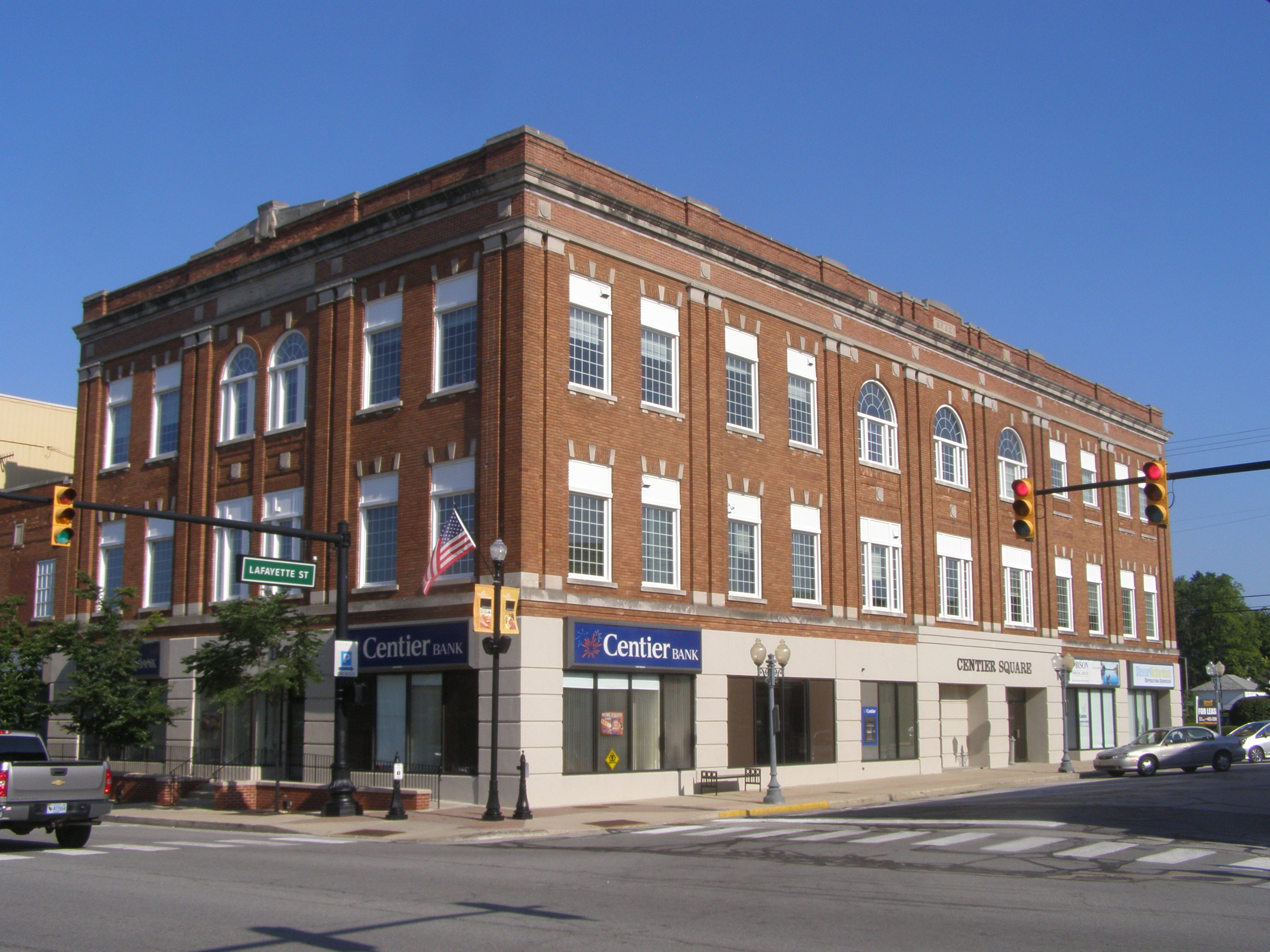
Elks Temple: Colonial Revival, 1924 (Centier Bank in 2015)

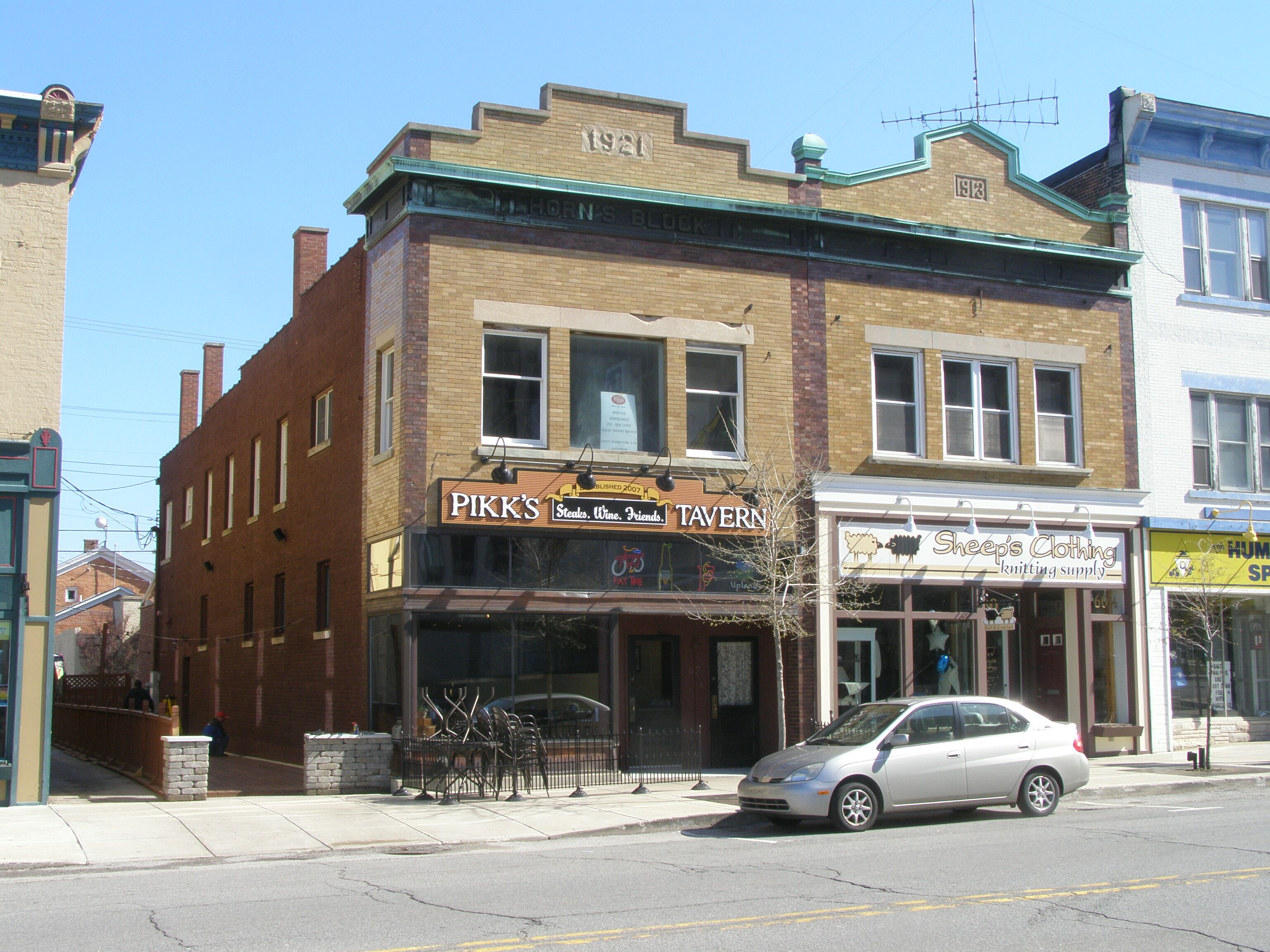
Horn's Block; 20th Century Funcational, 1921

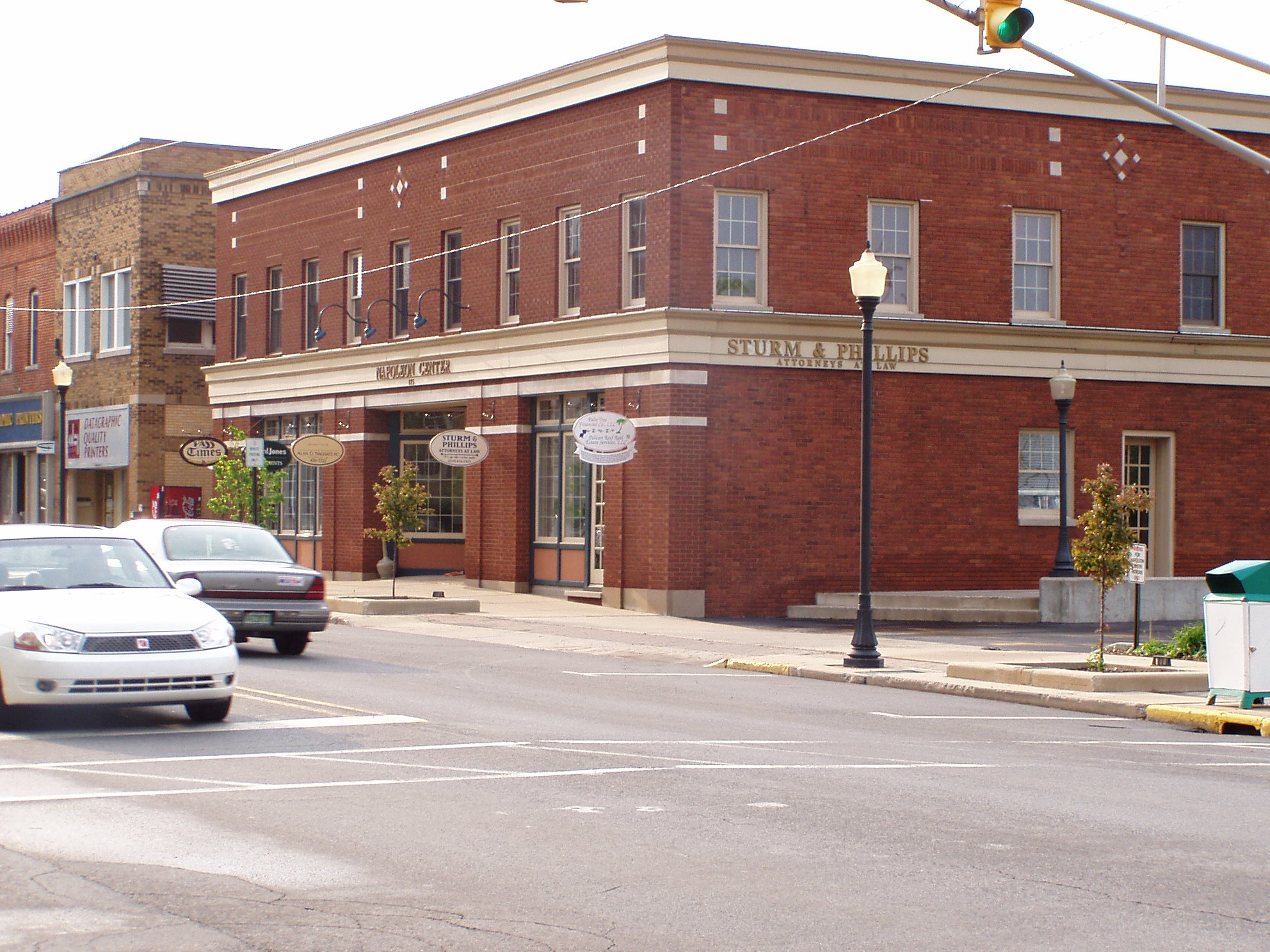
Post Tribune Building; 19th Century Functional, c.1870 (Napoleon Center in 2015)

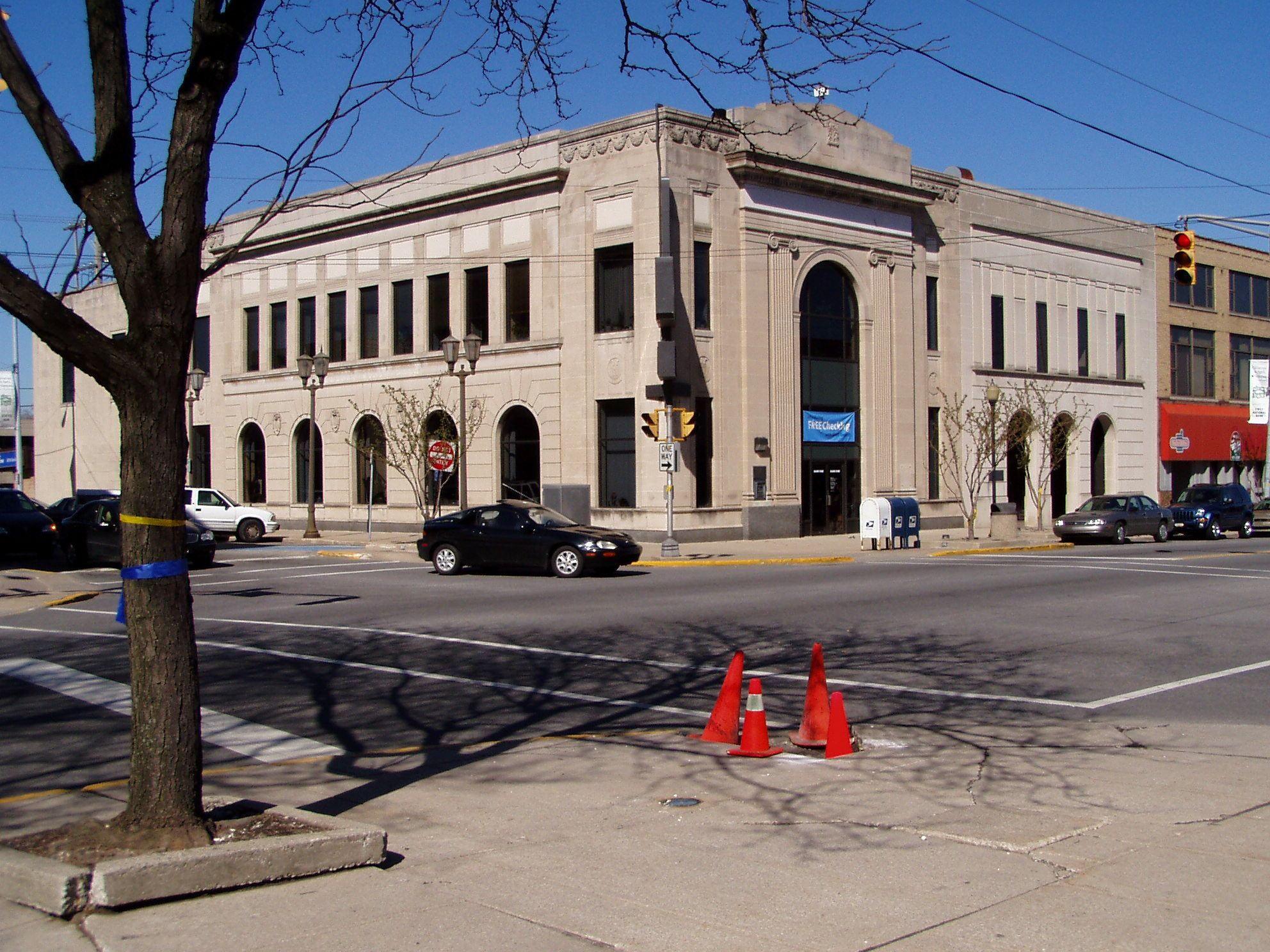
Farmer's State Bank; Neoclassical, 1927

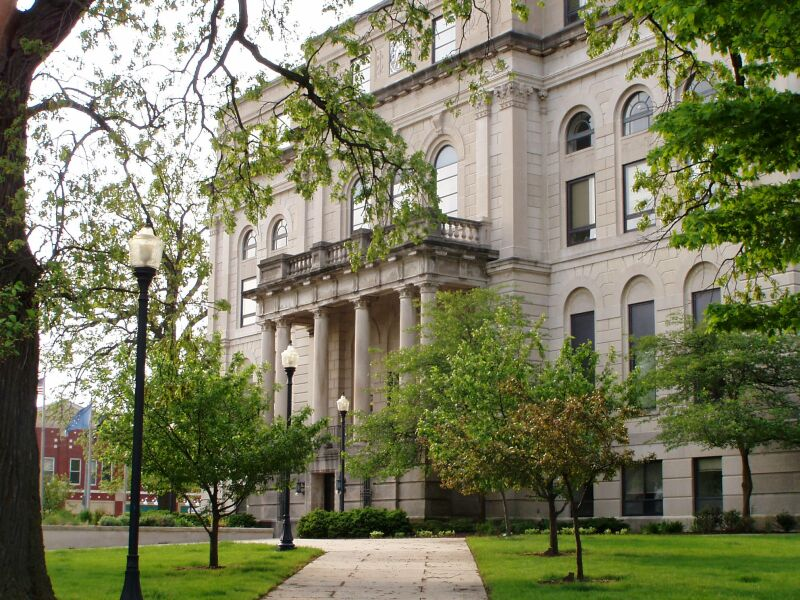
Porter County Courthouse; Second Empire/Neoclassical, 1885/1934

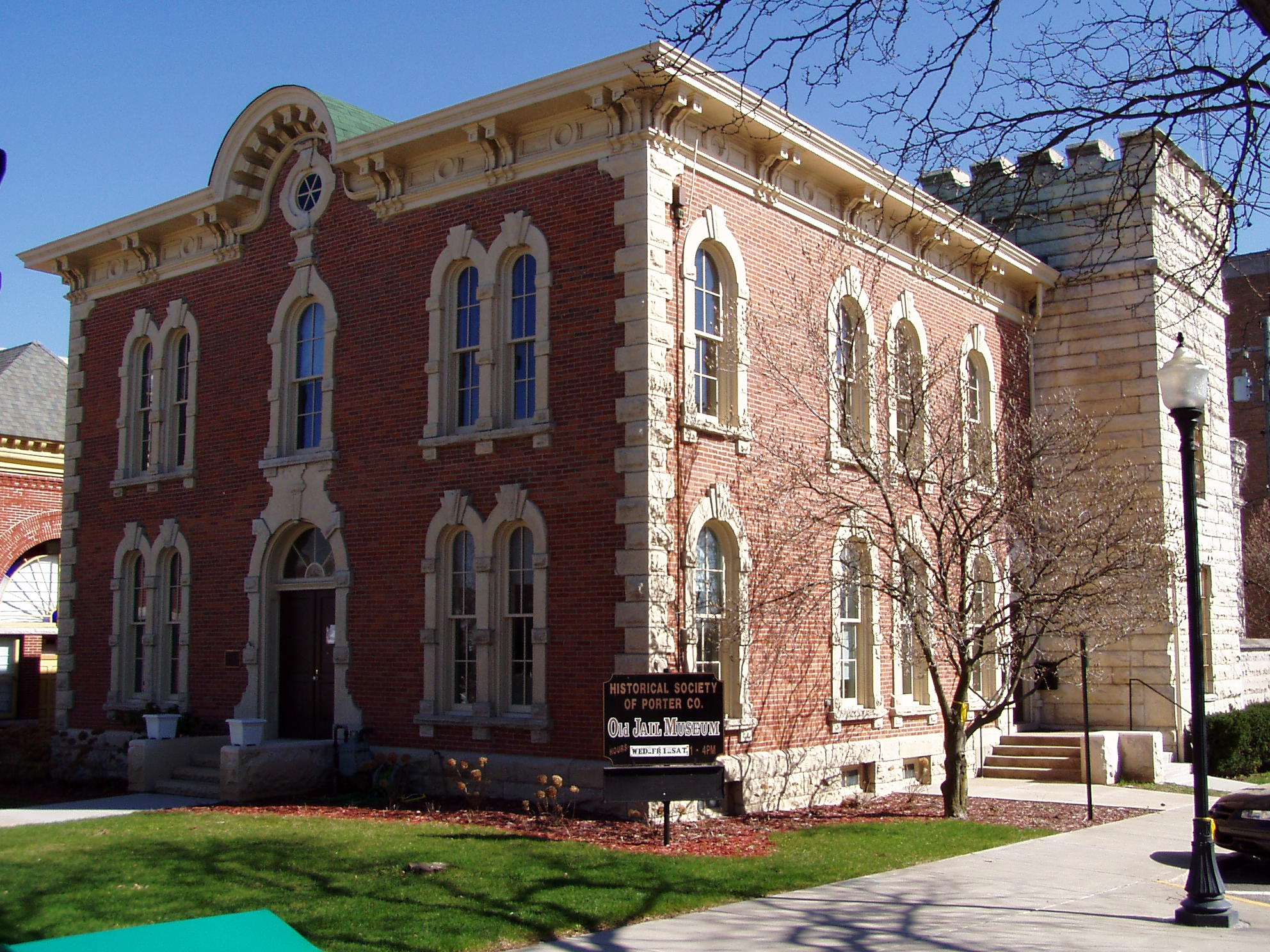
Porter County Jail and Sheriff's House & Jail, Italianate, 1860 (Porter County Museum) Oldest of three structures. Home of the Porter Museum (County History)

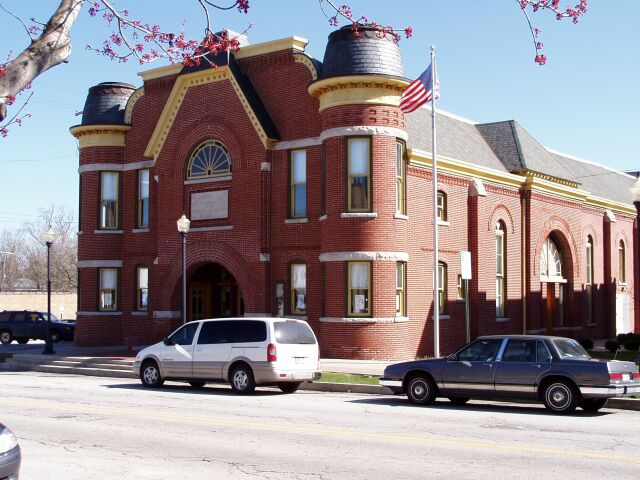
Memorial Hall, Romanesque Revival, 1893
