= Charles F. Lembke =

American architect (1865–1923)

- Born: March 4, 1865; Valparaiso, Indiana
- Died: 18 July 1923 (aged 58); Valparaiso, Indiana
- Occupation: Architect
- Awards: First Place and the Gold medal for the best two-room school house made of brick
- Buildings: DeMotte Hall, Valparaiso University
- Projects: Jackson Township District No. 5 School, Porter County Memorial Opera Hall

Charles F. Lembke (March 4, 1865 – July 18, 1923) was an American architect and contractor who was prominent in Valparaiso, Indiana. Lembke built many downtown Valparaiso-area buildings, such as the Memorial Opera House (National Register, 1984), Carnegie public Library, Hotel Lembke, and several local schools.

Lembke was born to German immigrants Christian Lembke and Caroline Nuppnau Lembke. He completed his education in his hometown of Valparaiso, then went on to Valparaiso University, completing his education in the School of Architecture at the University of Chicago. He returned to Valparaiso and formed the Charles Lembke company with his two brothers, William and Henry. Because state law would not allow an architect to build the structure he designed, Charles managed the design business and Henry managed the construction business; they built much of what they designed. Charles grandson stated in 1966 that the family felt that Charles best work as DeMotte Hall on the campus of Valparaiso University. Constructed in 1915 as the Agriculture and Domestic Science Building, the building served the university after 1959 as the Valparaiso School of Law.

== Awards ==
At the Paris Exposition of 1900, the French Society of Architects awarded Charles Lembke First Place and the gold medal for the best two-room school house made of brick. This was the Center Township District No. 3 School.

== Projects ==
Charles Lembke contributed a significant number of structures to Valparaiso and Porter County. He is credited with 28 residences, 18 schools, and 27 business. between 1900 and 1923.

- 1871, Porter County Jail, S. Washington, builder
- 1881, Telephone Building, architect
- 1890, Lembke House, 304 Morgan St., Valparaiso
- 1890, Vidette Messenger Building, 163-167 W. Lincolnway, architect
- 1891, Christian Hospital, 108 E. Jefferson St., architect, razed ca 1978
- 1893, Memorial Hall, 104 E. Indiana, architect
- 1895, Center Township District No. 1 School, aka Flint Lake School, SR 49 at 500 N., architect, razed 2000
- 1896, Jackson Township District No. 5 School, 300 E, architect
- 1898, Columbia School, 500 E. Indiana, architect, razed 1965
- 1899, Gardner School, W. Jefferson St, builder
- ca. 1900; Center Township District No. 3 School, architect,
- 1900. Science Building (Baldwin Hall), Valparaiso University, College Place; razed 1996
- 1900/12, J. Lowenstines and Sons, 57-63 N Franklin, architect, burned ca. 1992
- 1904, Valparaiso Central School, 305 N. Franklin St., architect, burned 1938
- 1905, Porter County Home, south S.R. 2
- 1905, Steve L. Finney House/Joseph Urschel House, 202 N. Michigan, architect
- 1906, Dr. David J. Loring Residence and Clinic, 102 N. Washington St, architect
- 1906–07, Biology and Medical Building, Valparaiso University, College Place, architect, razed ca 1995
- 1907, Lembke Hall, Valparaiso University, S. College St. (demolished 1996)
- 1909, Altruria Hall, Valparaiso University, College at Brown St, razed 1985
- ca 1910; Music Hall (Kinsey Hall), Valparaiso University, College St., architect, burned 1970
- 1912–13, Charles Thune House, 357 W. Jefferson St, builder
- 1914, Valparaiso Carnegie Library, 107 E. Jefferson St., builder. demolished 1995
- 1915, ca; Agriculture and Domestic Science Building, Valparaiso University, College at Freeman, architect; In 1959, it was renamed DeMotte Hall
- 1923, Hotel Lembke, 23 N. Lafayette St. at Jefferson, builder, razed 1988
- Auto Dealership, 212-216 E. Lincolnway, architect, first poured concrete structure in Valparaiso.
- Memorial Theater, W. Lincolnway, architect,
- Premier Theater, N. Franklin, architect
- Specht-Finney Building, Main (Lincolnway) at Franklin, architect
- St. Clair School, Union Township, 5 miles (8.0 km) west of Cooks Corner Elementary School., architect, razed ca 1943
- Bogarte Building, Bookstore, at Valparaiso University.

== Patents ==
Charles Lambke was awarded three patents on internal combustion engines.

Design	Rotary explosive-engine.	Internal-combustion engine.	Internal-combustion engine.
Publication #	US694557 A	US1108916 A	US1106720 A
Publication Date	Mar 4, 1902	Sep 1, 1914	Aug 11, 1914
