= Dr. David J. Loring Residence and Clinic =

Historic house in Indiana, United States

- U.S. National Register of Historic Places
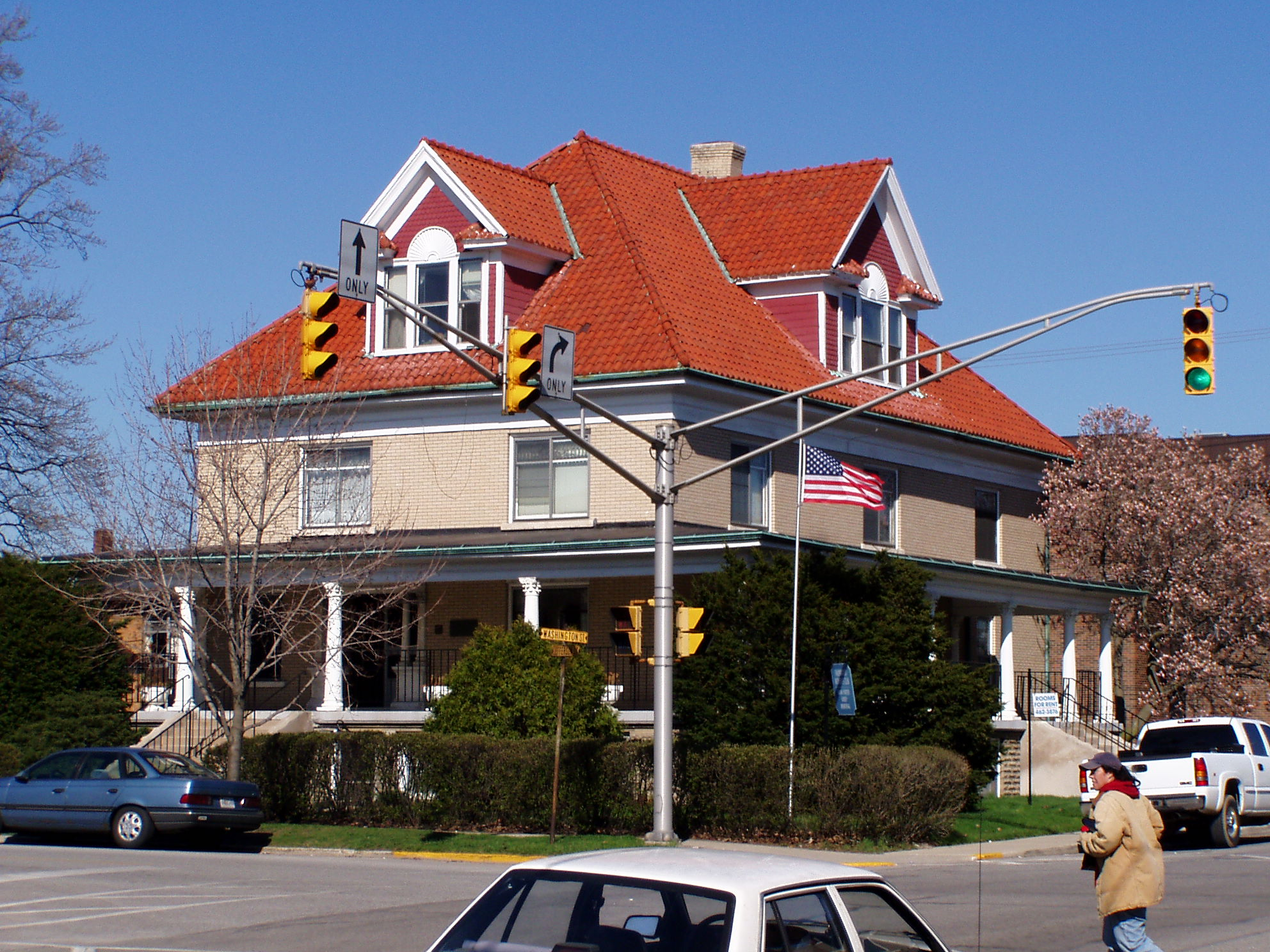

- Location within Indiana Location within the United States
- Location: 102 Washington St., Valparaiso, Indiana
- Coordinates: 41°28′8″N 87°3′39″W
- Built: 1905
- Architect: Lembke, Charles F.
- Architectural style: Colonial Revival
- NRHP reference No.: 84000520
- Added to NRHP: December 6, 1984

The Loring Residence and Clinic was the first facility built to provide medical services to Valparaiso, Indiana. The residence has continued to provide for public service through its current use by the Valparaiso Woman's Club. Dr. Loring used his home as his medical office until his death in 1914. It was Loring's initial efforts that brought medical care to the county and provided for the first hospital. Although private, it became the county's first public hospital when Loring sold the building in 1906 to build his home and clinic.

Loring was a physician and surgeon. He was vice president of the Indiana State Medical Association and founder of the Porter County Medical Society.

== History ==
Dr. Loring Movied to Valparaiso in 1882 after studying and practicing medicine at Rush Medical College in Chicago, Bellevue Hospital in New York and in Cincinnati. He originally moved to Francesville before settling in Valparaiso. Dr. Loring first opened a clinic and residence at the southwest corner of Jefferson Street and Michigan Street. In 1905, he decided to build a new clinic west on Jefferson on the northeast corner with Washington Street. Dr. Loring built his home in 1906 from the proceeds of the sale of his private hospital to the Valparaiso Christian Church (Disciples of Christ) for $13,000. His home was designed and built by local architect and builder Charles Lembke. When Dr. Loring died in 1914, his Washington Street home and office was sold to Dr. J. R. Pagin, who sold it to the Elks Club in 1924. The Elks own building had burned that year. The Elks decided within the year to rebuild on their own site. They resold the house the same year to the Woman's Club for $30,000. It was dedicated to Sarah Porter Kinsey on September 21, 1925. They paid off the mortgage and celebrated on December 1, 1939. The house was placed on the National Register of Historic Places in 1985. The property is located at the corner of Jefferson and Lafayette streets in Valparaiso, Indiana, one block north of the County Courthouse.

== Valparaiso Women's Club ==
The Woman's Club (founded in 1895) was a literary and social group. First known as the Ladies Reading Circle. They started a public library through book collections and gave the first $25 towards a lot for the Carnegie Library. The club was later called the Harriet Beecher Stowe Reading Circle (1896) and then the Harriet Beecher Stowe Club. In 1904 they became the Valparaiso Woman's Club, affiliated with the Indiana Federation of Clubs and the General Federation of Clubs.

== Architecture ==
The house was designed with the clinic in the basement and private living quarters on the upper floors. If a patient we not well enough to go home, they would be treated in a room on the upper floors for a few days. This two and a half-story, brick structure is located on a corner lot in Valparaiso's downtown. The Colonial Revival building has a hipped roof with three gabled dormers, a projecting gable, and a flat-roofed veranda, which extends across the front and most of the south side of the building. The main facade faces west. The basement level is covered with rock-faced stone, which continues around the exterior. The basement has a number of simple, double hung sash windows, with entries on the main and south facades providing direct access to the basement level. The main level of the front facade is three bays wide and sheltered by the veranda. Round white columns with Corinthian capitals support the veranda roof. A black wrought iron railing (not original) runs along the edges of the veranda. The main entrance is accessed by stone steps, which have wrought iron handrails and a center railing. It is located in the center bay of the main facade and consists of a wooden door with upper light. The door is flanked by paired Corinthian columns and pilasters situated on a pedestal, supporting an elaborate entablature. All are made of carved limestone. A large rectangular window with a transom of beveled leaded glass is located on each side of the doorway. Each window has a limestone, keystoned lintel and sill. All windows on the first level are of this design. All windows on the structure have been covered by aluminum storm windows. On the second level there are two large, rectangular windows that are similar to the first level windows except for the absence of keystone lintels. A wide wood cornice is located above the windows and extends around the exterior. The south facade is five bays wide on the main level. It also faces the street and is similar to the main facade. The veranda extends about two-thirds of the way across the exterior and shelters an entry similar to the main entry. Narrow windows frame the doorway.

A large window is located on the west end of the facade and a smaller window on the east end. On the second level, three large windows are aligned with the entry and end windows below. Of simple design, the north facade has a projecting center bay. The east rear facade has a service porch sheltered by a roof, which is supported by four round columns with Corinthian capitals; two are engaged columns. The hip roof is clad in red tile. The Woman's Club restored the original red tile roof, which had been replaced by an asphalt roof. The roof has a dormer on all but the north side, which was a gabled projection. Each dormer, finished with wood, fish-scale siding has a triple window design highlighted by a carved wood rising sun over the center window, Suggesting Palladian proportions. A red tile gable roof tops each dormer and has a classics roof return on which the red tile rests. An interior brick chimney is offset on the east end of the roof ridge.

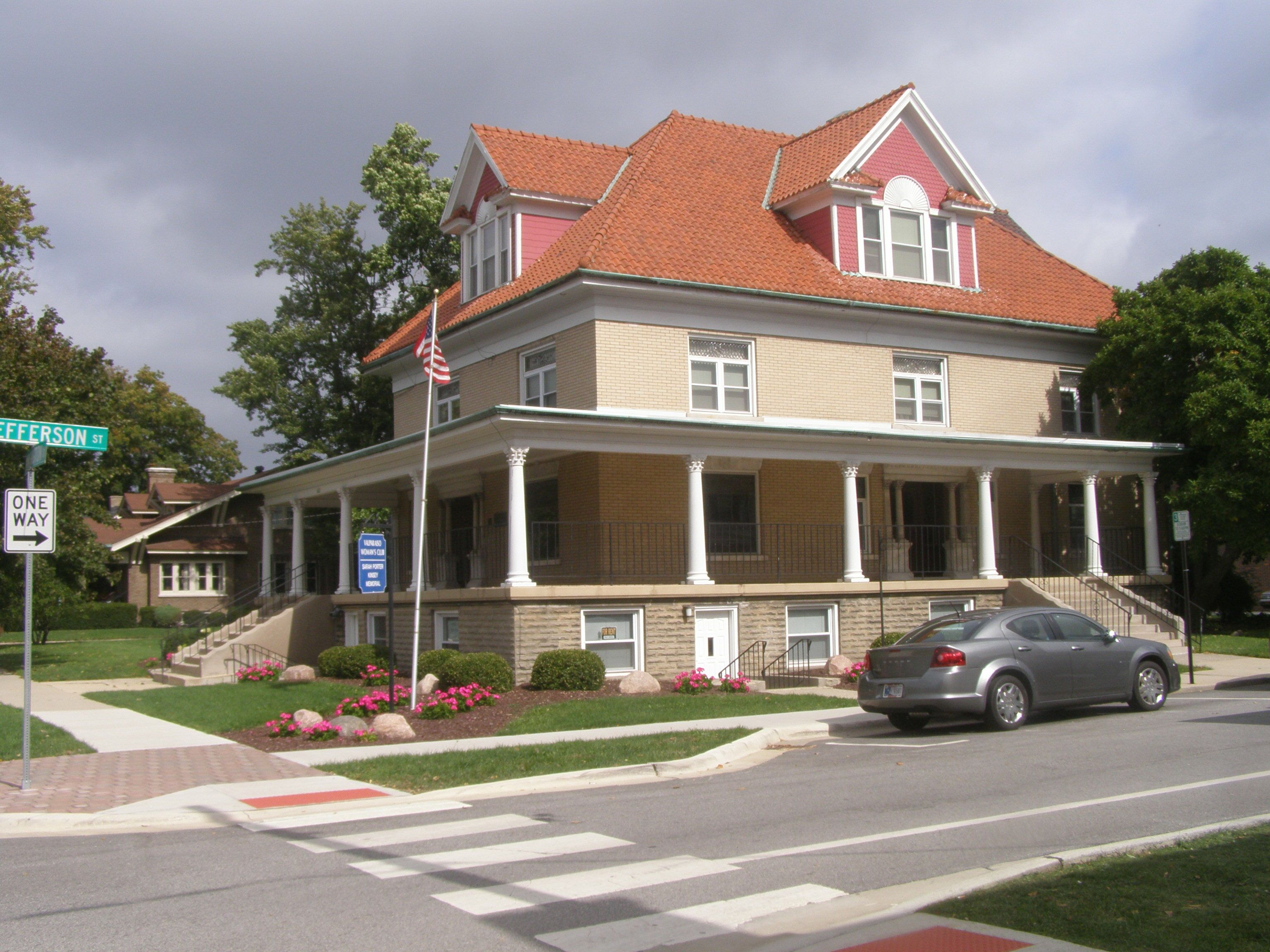
Jefferson (south facade) (Dr. Loring Residence and Clinic), Valparaiso, Indiana

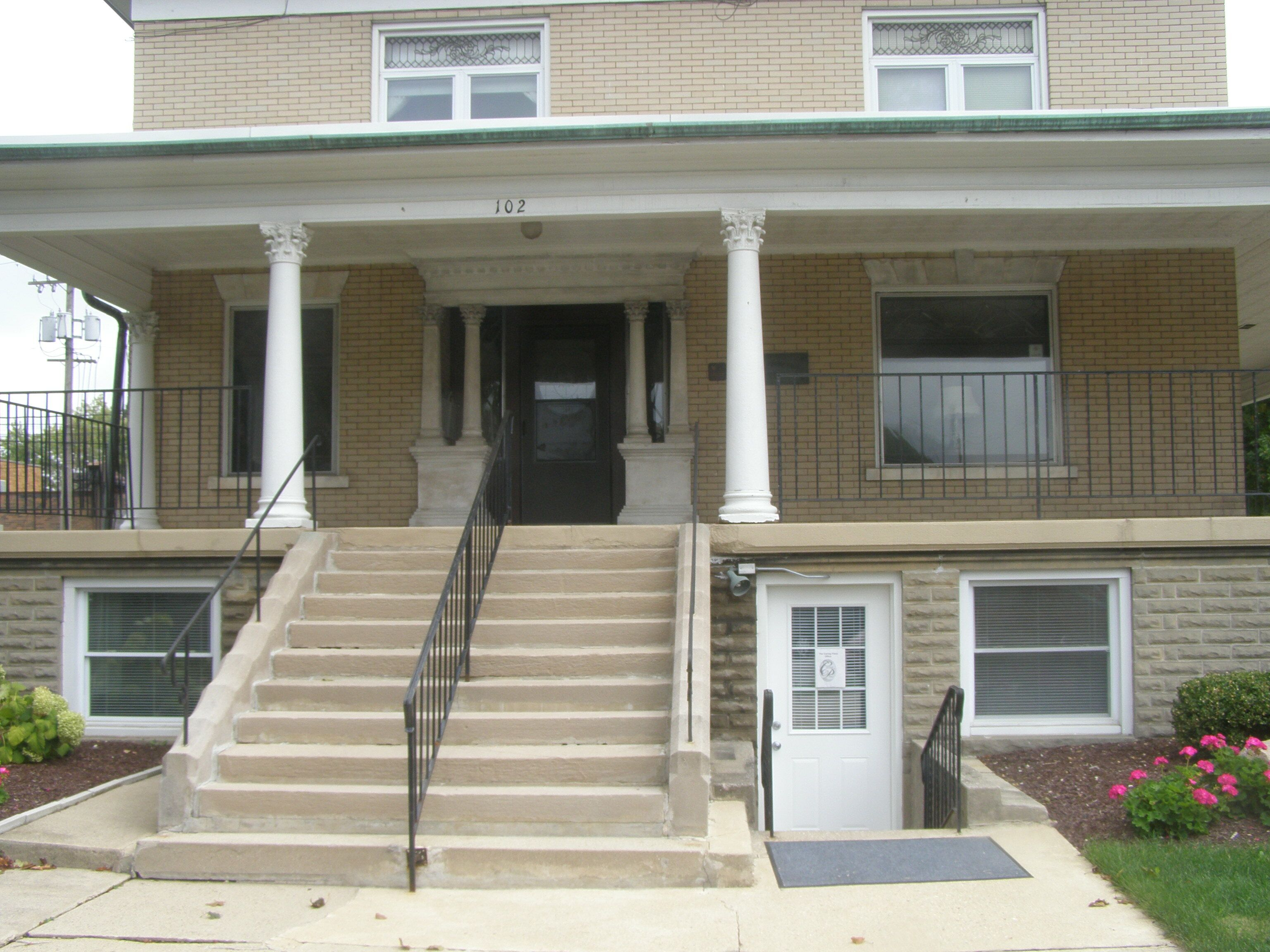
Main Entrance, (Dr. Loring Residence and Clinic), Valparaiso, Indiana

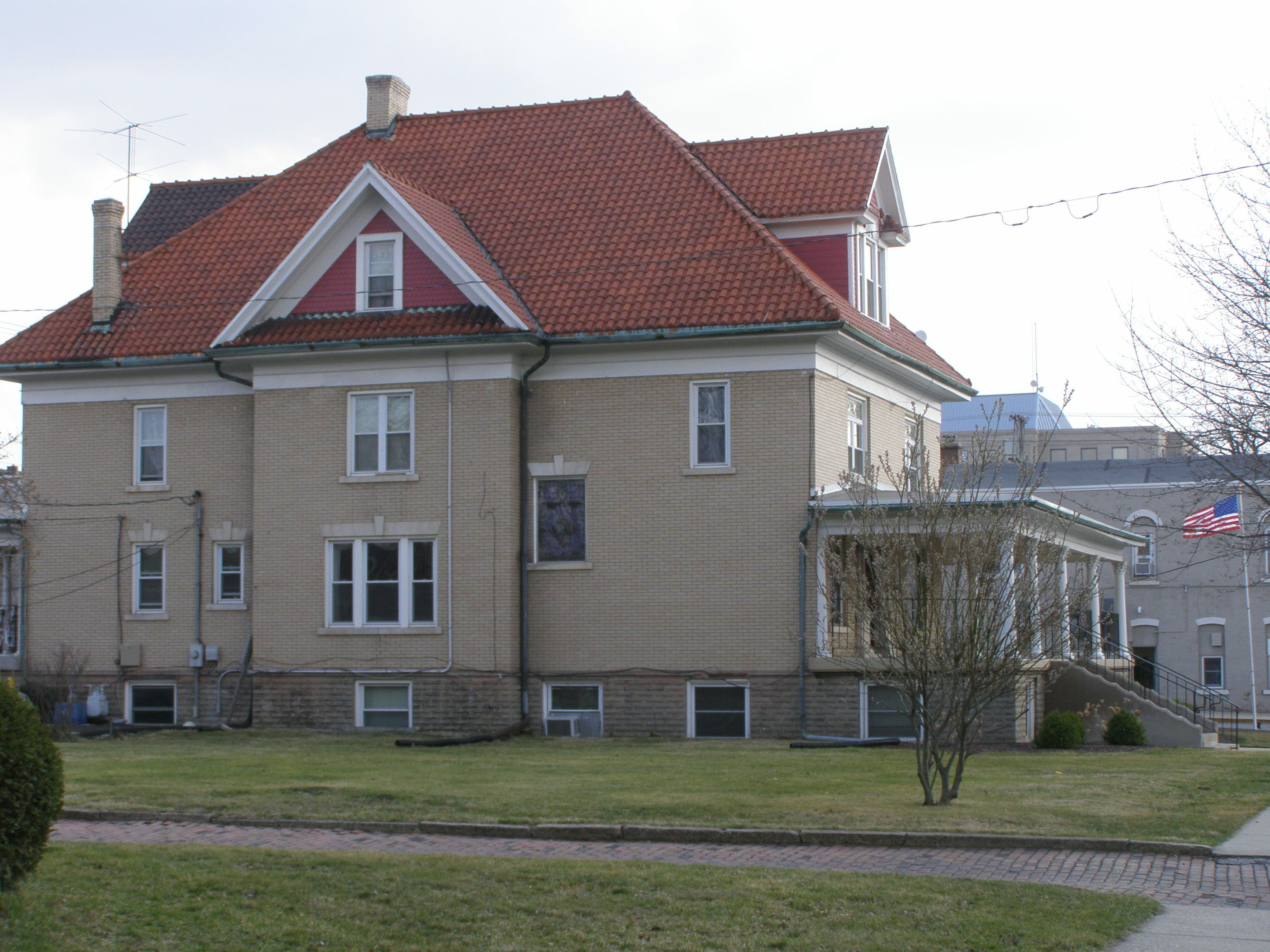
North Face, (Dr. Loring Residence and Clinic), Valparaiso, Indiana

== Sources ==
- Mullins, Lanette, Images of America; Valparaiso – Looking Back, Moving Forward, Chicago, Illinois: Arcadia Publishing, 2002.
- Neeley, George E., City of Valparaiso, A Pictorial History, G. Bradley Publishing, Inc.; St. Louis, Missouri: G. Bradley Publishing, Inc., 1989.
- Porter County Interim Report, Indiana Historic Sites and Structures Inventory, Historic Landmarks Foundation of Indiana, July 1991.
