= Porter County Memorial Opera Hall =

- Porter County Memorial Hall
- U.S. National Register of Historic Places
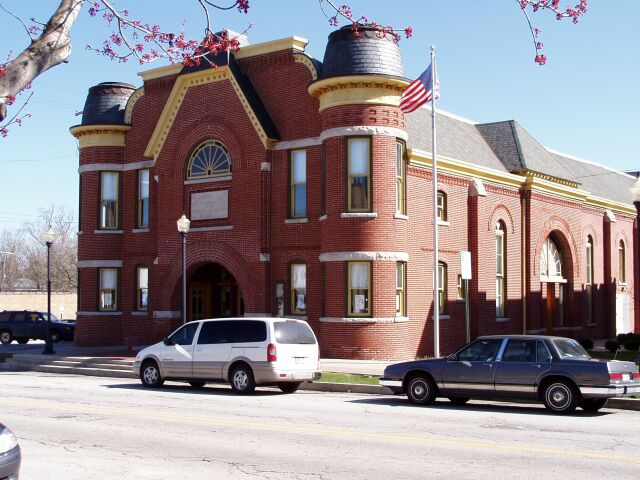
- Porter County Memorial Hall in 2004

- Location within Indiana Location within the United States
- Location: 104 Indiana Ave., Valparaiso, Indiana
- Coordinates: 41°28′0″N 87°3′33″W
- Area: less than one acre
- Built: 1893
- Architect: Lembke, Charles F.
- Architectural style: Queen Anne
- NRHP reference No.: 84001231
- Added to NRHP: May 23, 1984

The Porter County Memorial Hall, also known as Memorial Opera House, is an historic Grand Army of the Republic memorial hall located in Valparaiso, Indiana, United States. It was the meeting place of Chaplain Brown GAR Post No. 106, one of 592 GAR posts in Indiana. Designed in 1892 by a local architect, Charles F. Lembke, using Romanesque styling, it was built in 1892–3 to seat 100 people. It was also used as the local opera house.

Local legend says that Wm Jennings Bryan spoke at the hall during the 1896 presidential campaign. Others who have been to the hall include Theodore Roosevelt, John Philip Sousa, and the Marx Brothers. Decline began with the advent of the movies, for which it was converted. By the time of World War II it was an abandoned building. Beginning in 1955, the Community Theatre Guild leased the property and began maintaining it once again for theater productions, continuing to do so under a lease agreement with Porter County until the county again took full possession in the late 1990s to facilitate structural renovation and restoration. The Board of Commissioners for Porter County, who manage and maintain the structure, restored the hall in 1998, and established a new community theatre troupe and public management for touring productions, allowing the building to continue to be used as a theatrical and assembly facility as originally intended.

The Memorial Opera House is located at 104 Indiana Avenue just east of the historic Porter County Jail and Sheriff's House. At the time of construction, Indiana Avenue was called Mechanics Street. The Opera House was added to the National Register of Historic Places in 1984. It was restored in 1998.Today, the Memorial Theatre Company produces six theatrical performances each year and host community concerts and other events. p

== Exterior ==
The 1893 Memorial Opera House is eclectic in its styling, with the details, symmetry, and size associated with the Queen Anne style. Additional influences are seen in the broad entrance arches and side windows. This may reflect the influence of Louis Sullivan or H. H. Richardson, both active in nearby Chicago during this time.

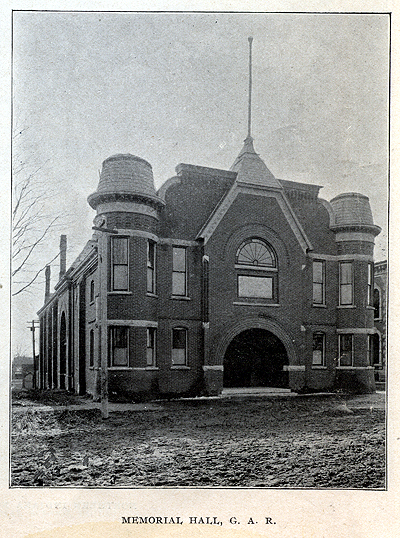
Memorial Hall, G.A.R., 1898. Photograph courtesy of the Steven R. Shook collection.

The main facade features a projecting, two-story central bay, with a jerkin-head gable. The ground floor of the bay is occupied by a broad, low-springing arch, formed by seven header courses of brick with rock-face limestone springers. The main entrance consists of two pairs of multi-light doors. Eight radiating lights fill the tympanum. Above the entrance is a recessed panel on a stone sill with the inscription, "1883, Memorial Hall, A monument to the Soldiers and Sailors of 1861-5." Above the dedication stone is a limestone sill and a fanlight with clear and stained glass set in a seven-course brick arch. A coved verge board outlines the edge of the jerkin-head gable, and is decorated by rosettes. On both sides of the central bay there are a single bay. At ground level, the windows are segmentally arched double-hung, with stone sills level with the springers of the central arch. Above, the double-hung windows have stone sills, and a stone belt course, serving as the lintels. A parapet with rounded "shoulders," on a stone cornice of corbelled brick. Two round towers frame the main facade. Rectangular windows have a stringcourse forming the sills, in line-with the central arch springers. A rock-faced belt course forming the lintels. Decorative brick detailing above the windows forms a foundation for a floriated frieze, with a modillioned cornice. Two-story structure has a pitched roof, interrupted by hipped roofs over projecting bays. Round-arched windows on each side, replicate the main façade. Shallow buttresses, interrupt the wall surface

== Interior ==
The interior retains the orchestra pit and side boxes. The boxes are framed by turned posts, and the appliqué decorated railings. Latticework, similar to that used in Queen Anne houses, connects the posts across the top. A new floor with modern seating was installed in 1967, along with improvements to the orchestra pit. The improvement cost about $250,000.

== Significance ==
The idea of building a memorial hall was started by the Chaplain Brown Post of the Grand Army of the Republic. They held a public subscription drive to secure the funds. The county Commissioners provided a lot and additional funds. Once open in 1893, the GAR held patriotic rallies, concerts, and lectures in the building, but were unable to cover the Post's debts and operating costs. In 1901 the County assumed the debts and control of the building. In 1901, the building was leased to Albert F. Heineman. He provided brought in entertains for the city, including minstrel troupes, traveling theatrical companies, political figures, and vaudeville. William Jennings Bryan is said to have given his "Cross of Gold and Crown of Thorns" speech here, two years before the Chicago nominating convention in 1896, and Theodore Roosevelt appeared in 1900, while campaigning William McKinley as the vice presidential nominee.

Live performances were the mainstay at the Opera House until the 1920s. Then, movies began to compete with and soon replace live performances. Some films and performances by local groups shared the stage during the 1920s, 1930s and 1940s. The Opera House was vacant as much as it was in use. In the 1950s demolition was being considered. In 1957 the Community Theatre Guild was formed with the express purpose the renovation and preservation of the Opera House. The Guild arranged a lease from the County Commissioners, and began making repairs and creating a stage for local talent. Work peaked in 1967, when a $250,000 renovation project was undertaken. The Guild continues to operate at the nearby Chicago Street Theatre, located several blocks north of the Opera House, but vacated the Opera House in the mid-1990s when a multi-million dollar renovation and restoration was undertaken by the county. The building combines elements typical of the 1890s into a composition most easily described as Queen Anne.

== Gallery ==
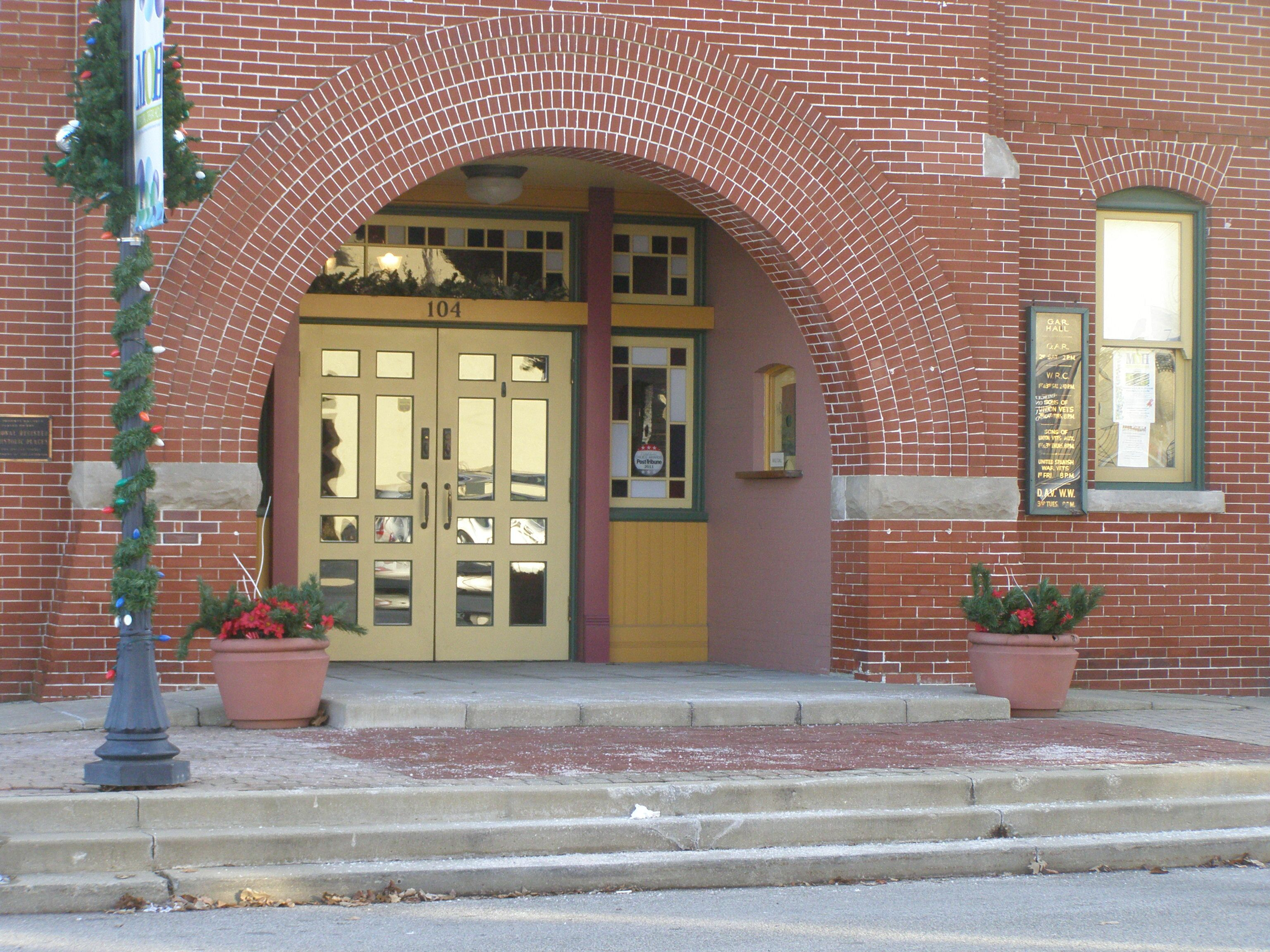
Entrance arch

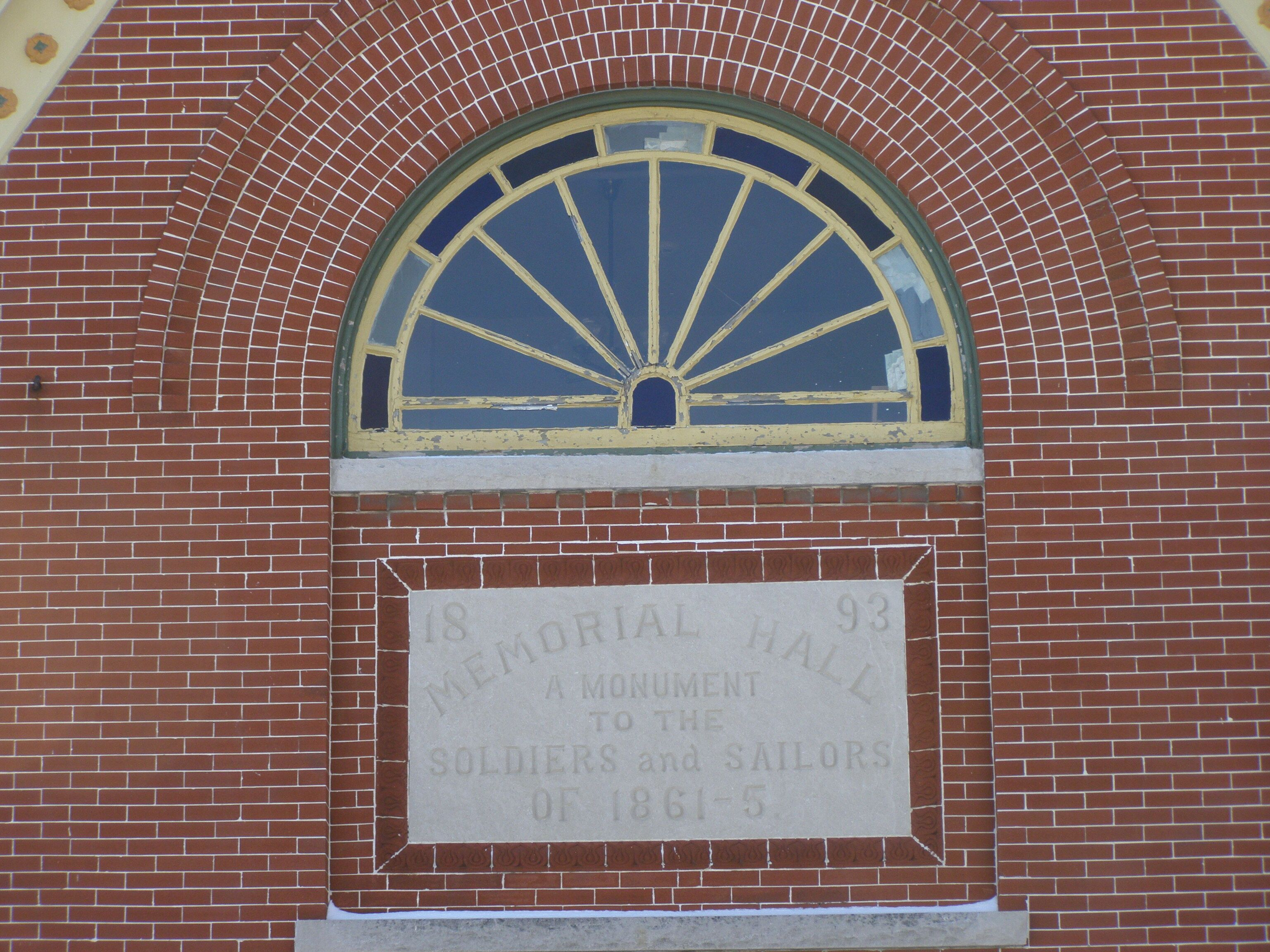
Dedication stone

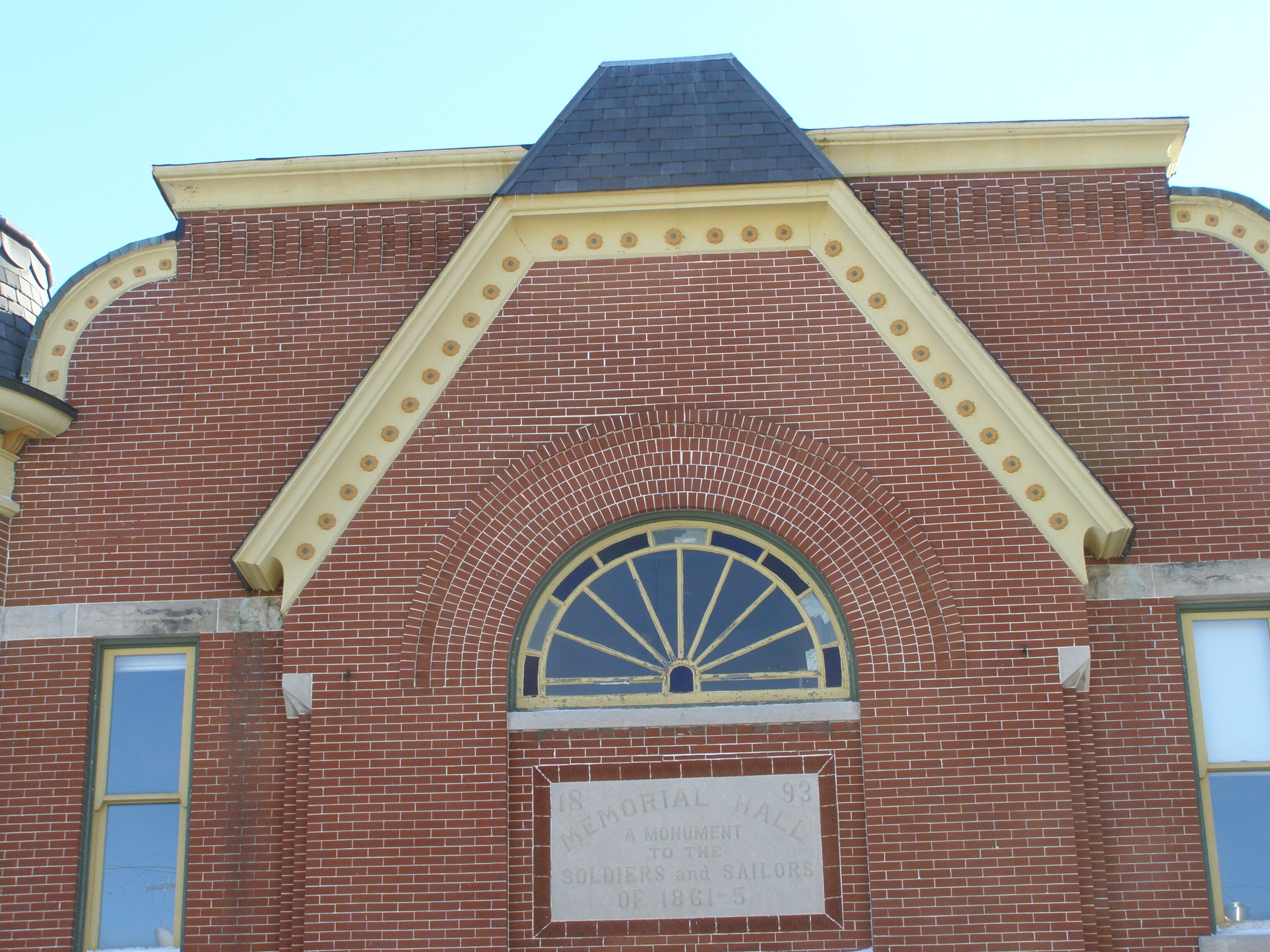
Jerkin-gable and fan light

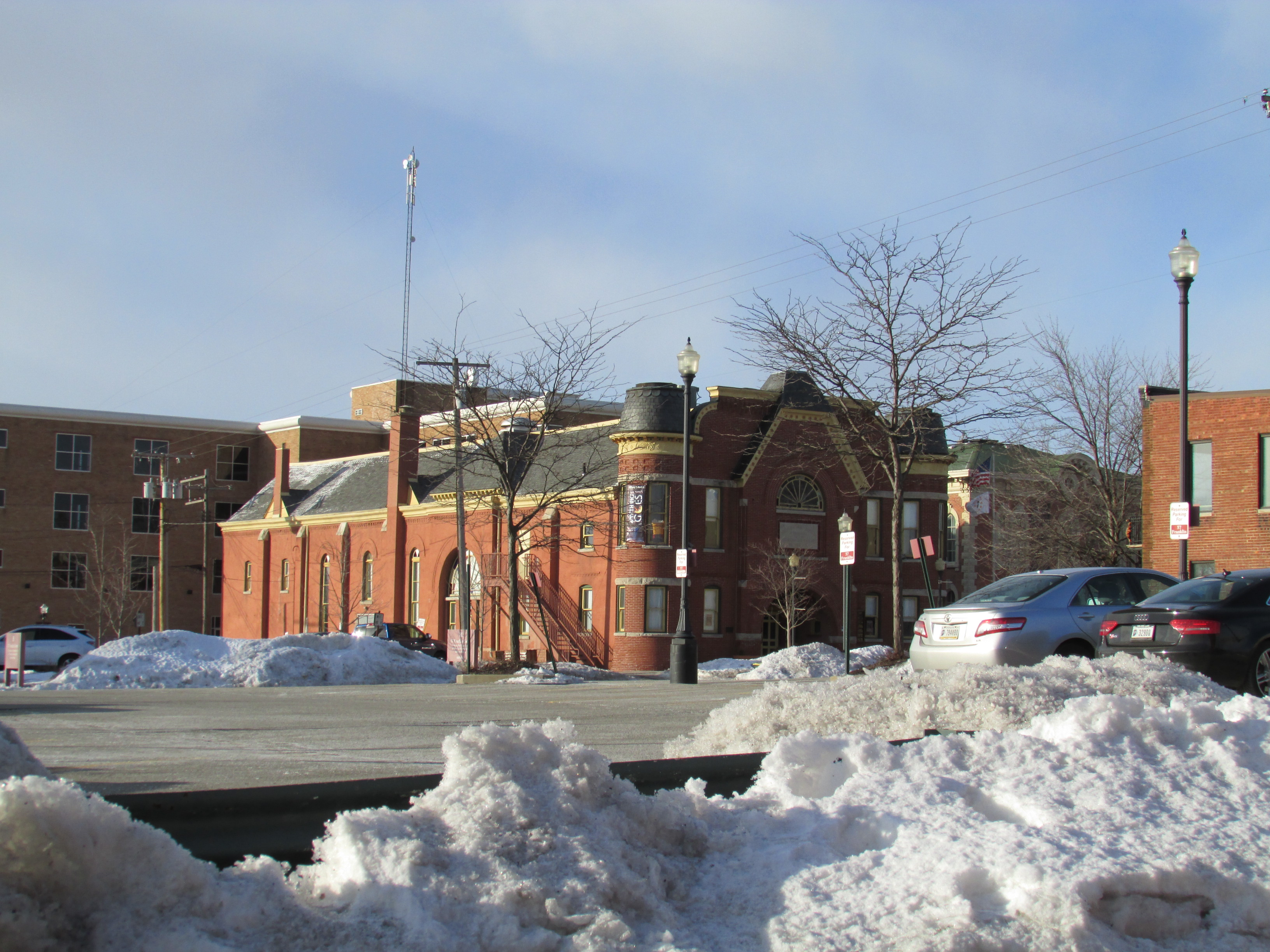
East façade

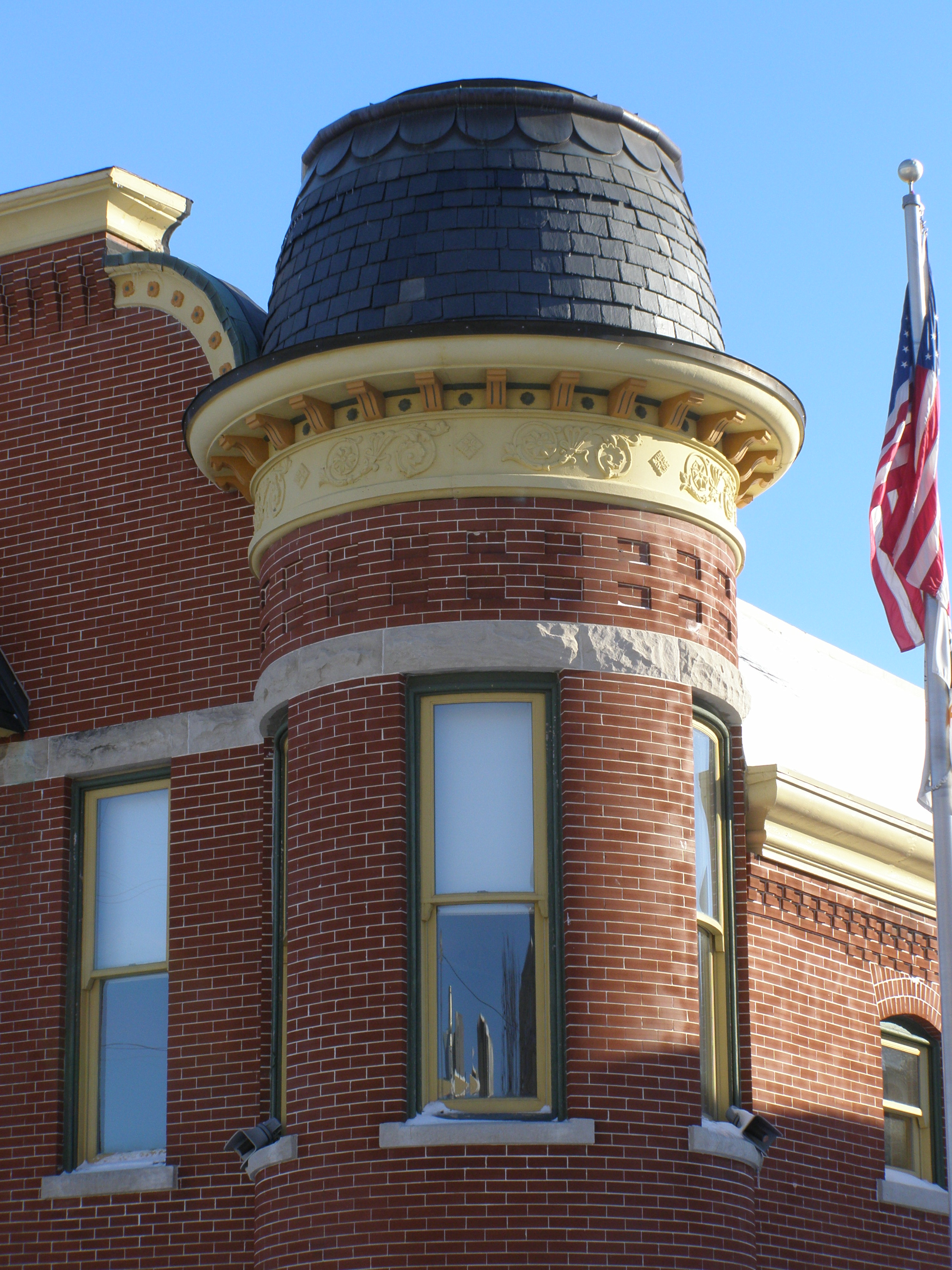
Northwest turret

Front view

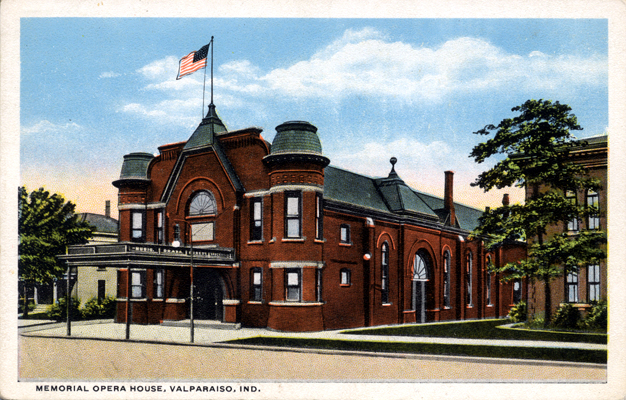
1918 View

== Bibliography ==
- Hahn, Anthony Wayne. A History of the Porter County Memorial Opera House; an unpublished research report, 1971.
- Vidette-Messenger, March 25, 1960.
- Post Tribune, December 26, 1982, and December 9, 1983.

== Sources ==
- Mullins, Lanette; Images of America; Valparaiso – Looking Back, Moving Forward; Arcadia Publishing; Chicago, Illinois; 2002
- Neeley, George E.; City of Valparaiso, A Pictorial History; G. Bradley Publishing, Inc.; St. Louis, Missouri; 1989; pg.
- Porter County Interim Report, Indiana Historic Sites and Structures Inventory; Historic Landmarks Foundation of Indiana; July 1991
