= Porter County Courthouse (Indiana) =

Coordinates: 41.467302°N 87.060353°W

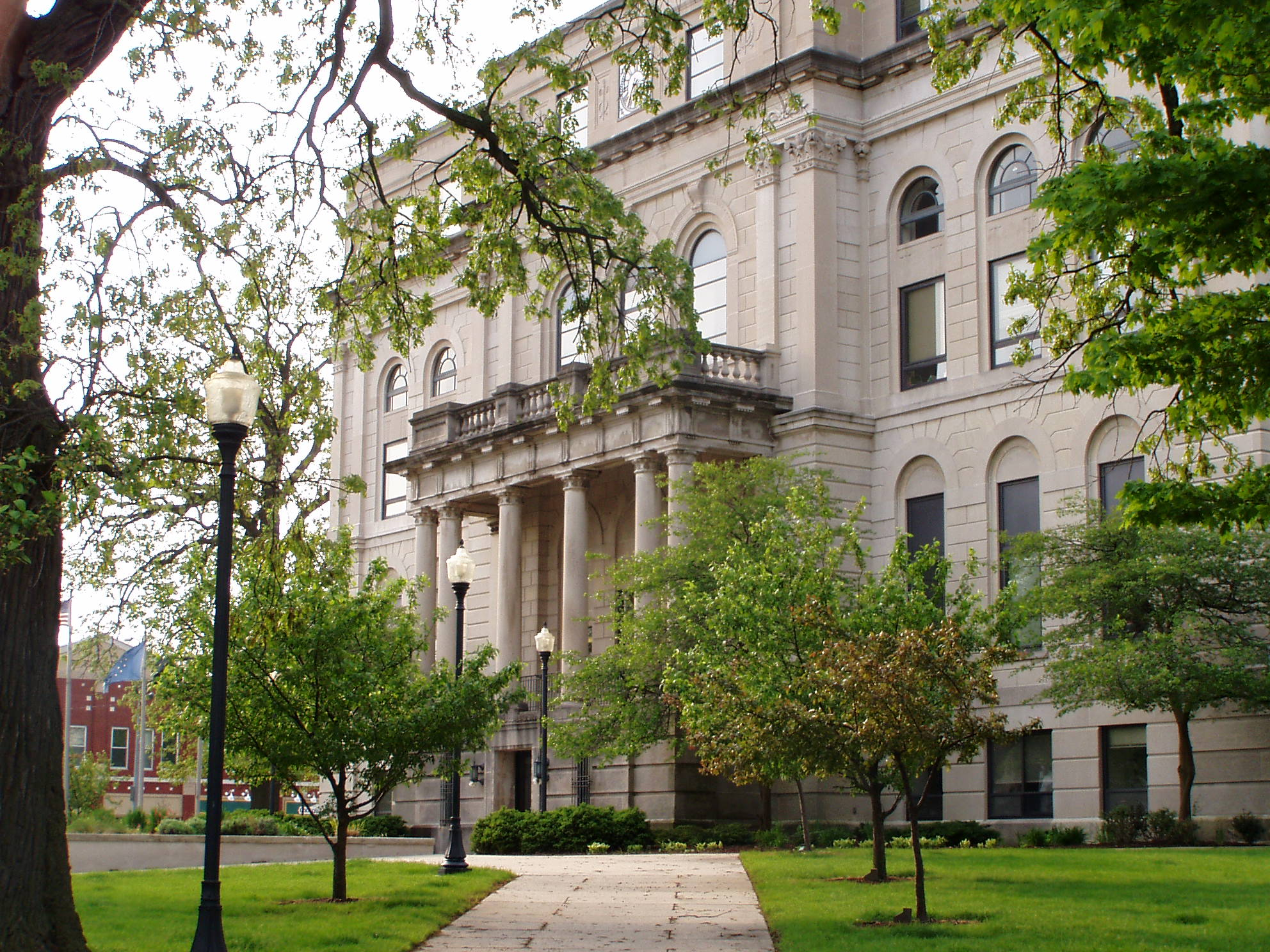
North face of the Porter County Courthouse

Porter County Courthouse is in Valparaiso, Porter County, Indiana. The current building replaced the brick building in 1883. The current building is 128 feet by 98 feet. It was built with a square tower rising out of the center. The tower was 168 feet tall with a clock on each side. Built of Indiana limestone from Ellettsville, it cost $125,909. During construction there were several problems with the building stone. It was eventually finished at an additional $10,000 cost.

== History ==
The County Courthouse has always occupied this site. The first Courthouse was built in 1837. It was a wooden frame construction at a cost of $1,250. In 1853 it was replaced by a brick building (40 x 60 foot) at a cost of $13,000. An old photograph I the Historical Society of Porter County shows a Greek Revival style building. Rectangular shape with a belfry rising above a pilastered portico. The belfry is three horizontal bands, the second with louvers for a bell and a small domed top.

On December 27, 1934, the Courthouse caught fire. The temperatures were below zero degrees Fahrenheit. The fire rose through the 168-foot tall tower sending ashes across the city. It took local fire departments and some from Gary and LaPorte to finally contain the blaze. When it was out, the central structure was severely damaged and the building gutted. The building was repaired at a cost of $172,000 by a Lafayette firm. While the profile has been lowered and the tower has not been rebuilt. The current building is much of what was restored in 1937.

== See also ==
- Valparaiso Downtown Commercial District

== Sources ==
- Mullins, Lanette; Images of America; Valparaiso – Looking Back, Moving Forward; Arcadia Publishing; Chicago, Illinois; 2002
- Neeley, George E.; City of Valparaiso, A Pictorial History; G. Bradley Publishing, Inc.; St. Louis, Missouri; 1989;
- Porter County Interim Report, Indiana Historic Sites and Structures Inventory; Historic Landmarks Foundation of Indiana; July 1991
