= Porter County Museum =

Historic house in Indiana, United States

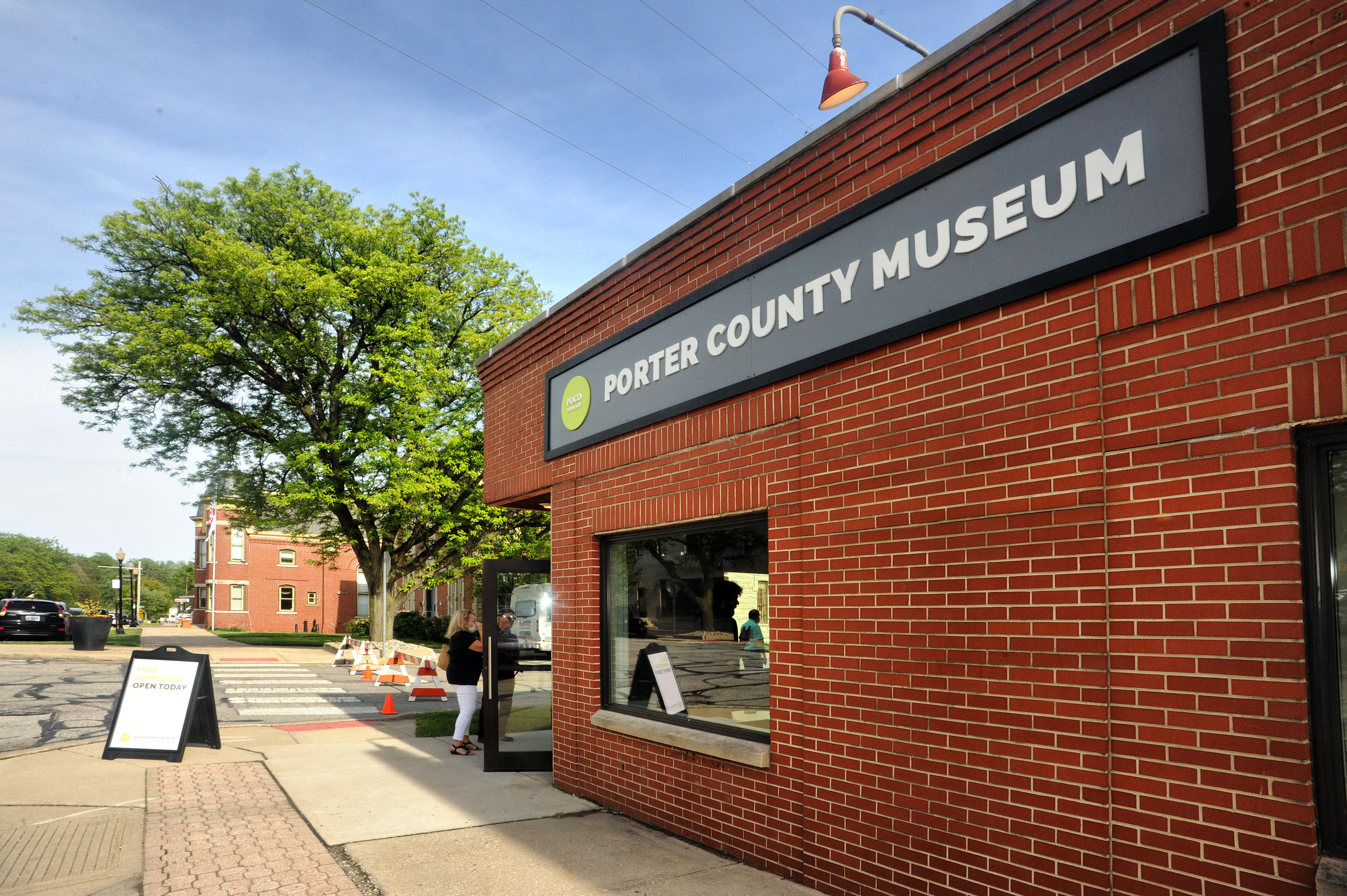
Photo of Porter County Museum located at 20 Indiana Ave. Taken by Trent Albert of Albert Photographic.

The Porter County Museum (PoCo Muse) is a museum that is located at 20 Indiana Avenue, Valparaiso, Indiana.

From May 11, 1975, until March 12, 2020, the museum was located in the old Porter County Jail and sheriffs residence, located at 153 Franklin Street, Valparaiso, Indiana, across the street from its current home. The jail was added to the National Register of Historic Places in 1976. The museum was founded in 1916 by the Porter County Historical Society (now the PoCo Muse Foundation), the PoCo Muse is the oldest institution devoted to the history and culture of Porter County, Indiana.

Artifacts were displayed in the lower level of the Valparaiso Public Library from 1916 until 1937, on the top floor of the Porter County Courthouse from 1938 until 1973, and inside the 1871 Porter County Jail and Sheriff's Residence from 1975 until 2020. Currently The PoCo Muse is located across from two of its previous homes at 20 Indiana Avenue in downtown Valparaiso.

== Gallery ==
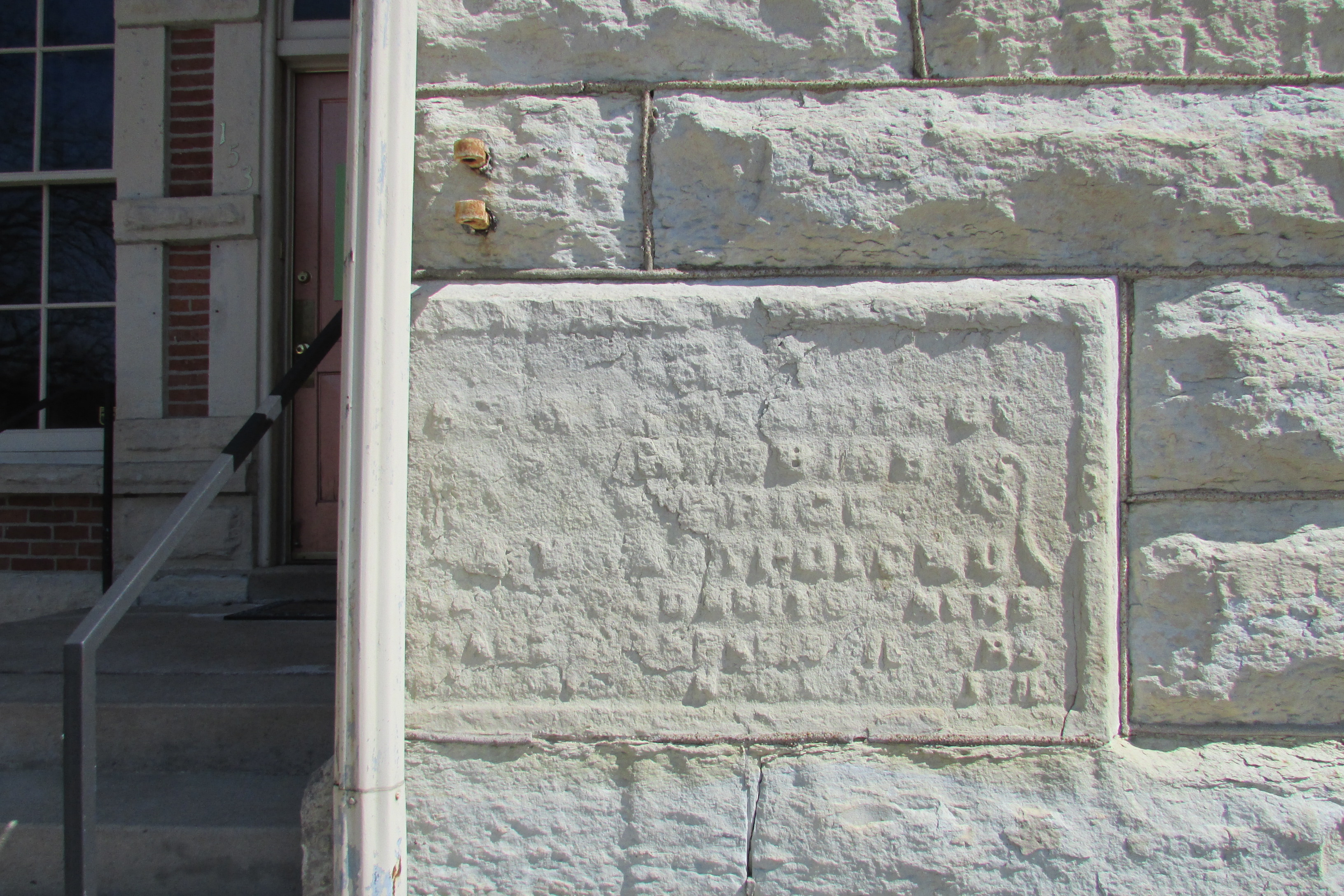
Cornerstone

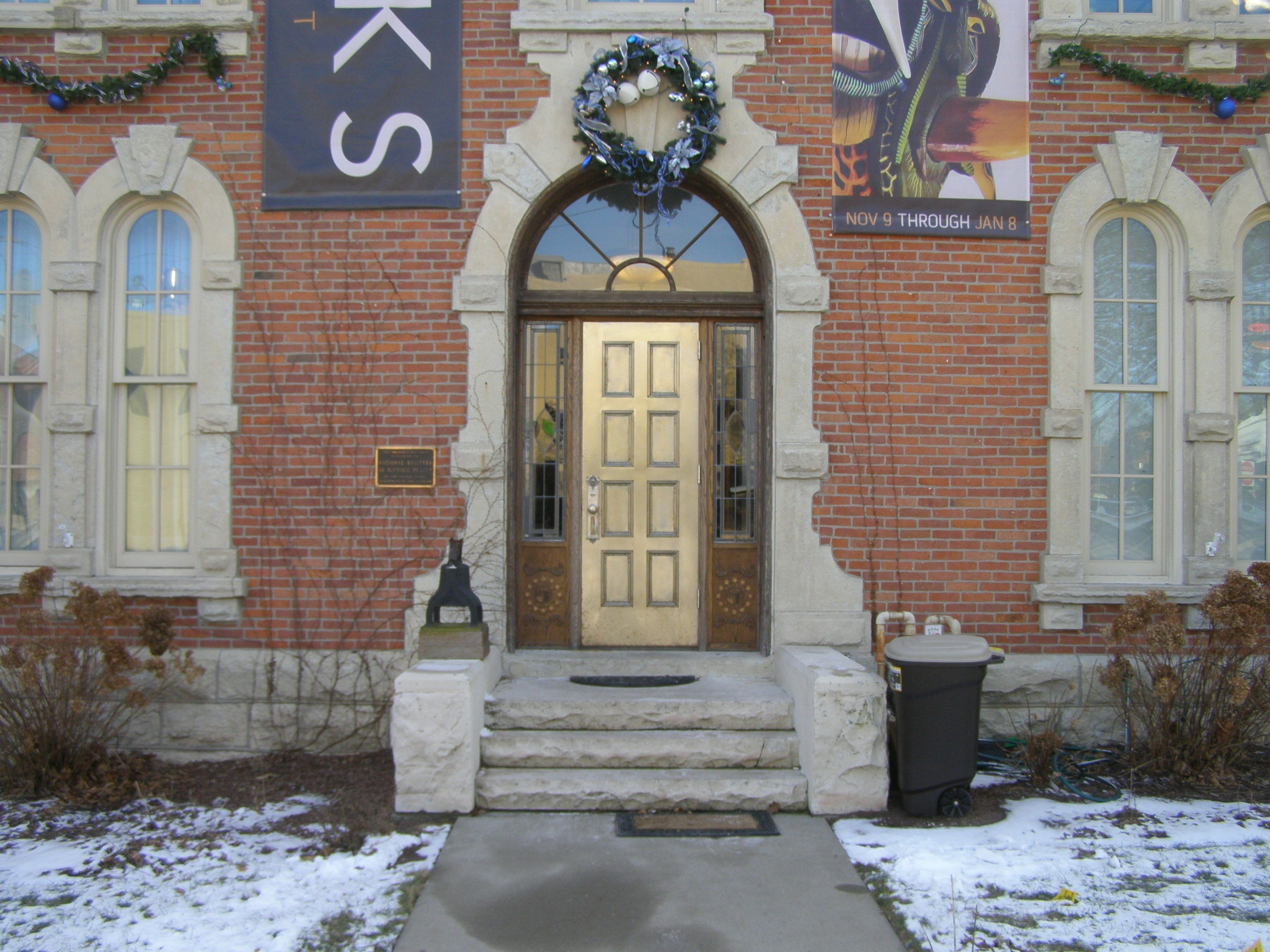
Front door to Sheriff's House

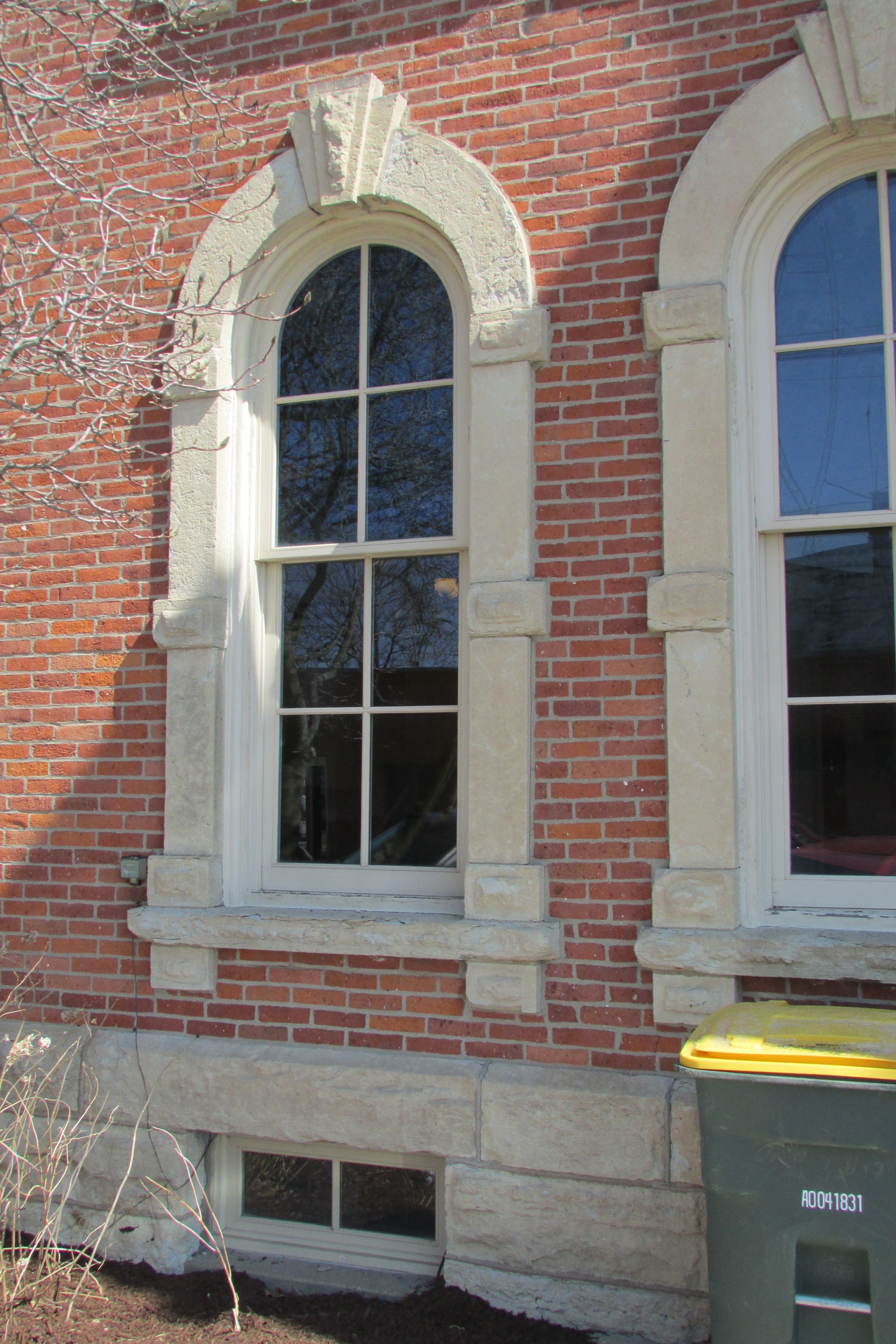
Window Styling

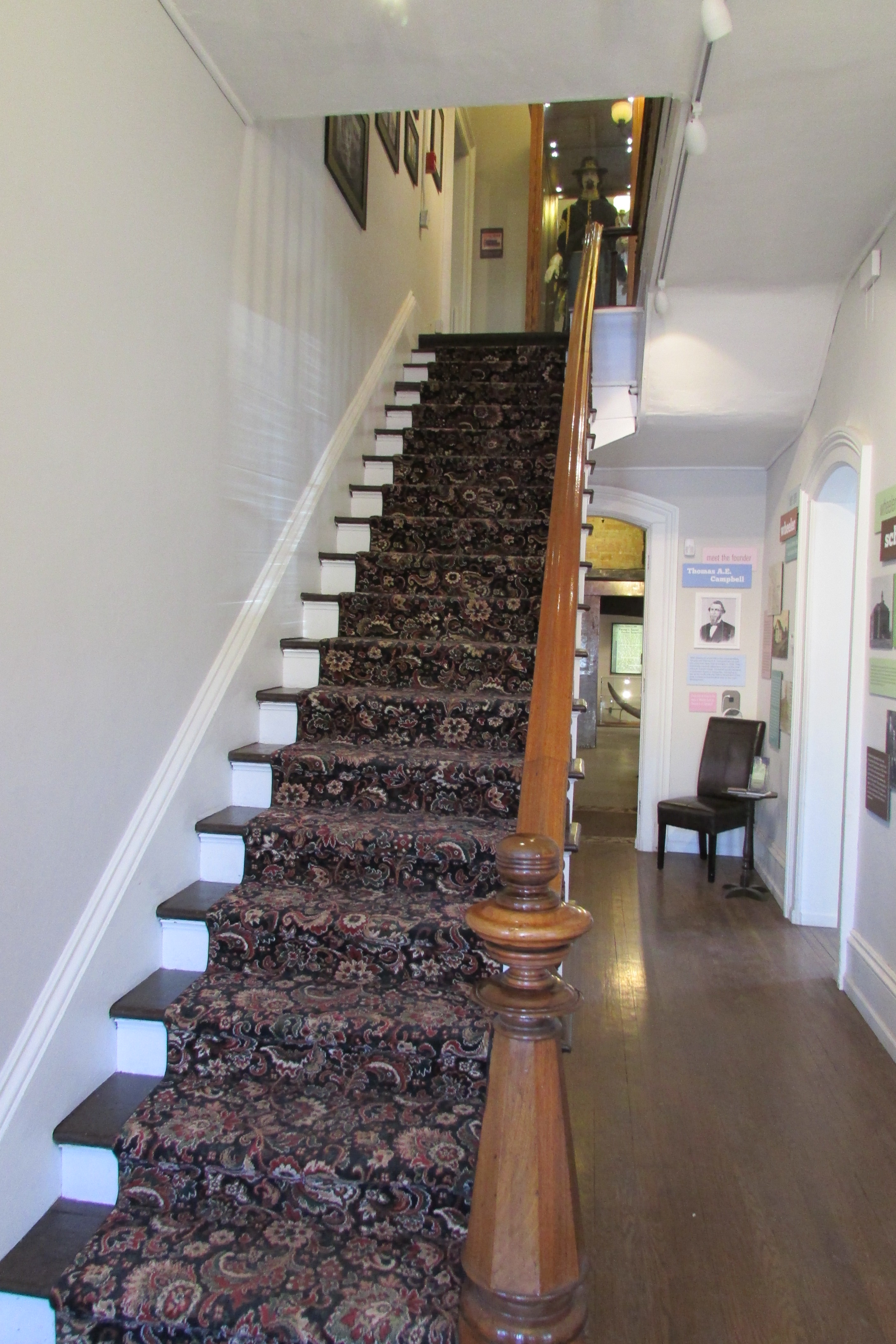
Main stairway

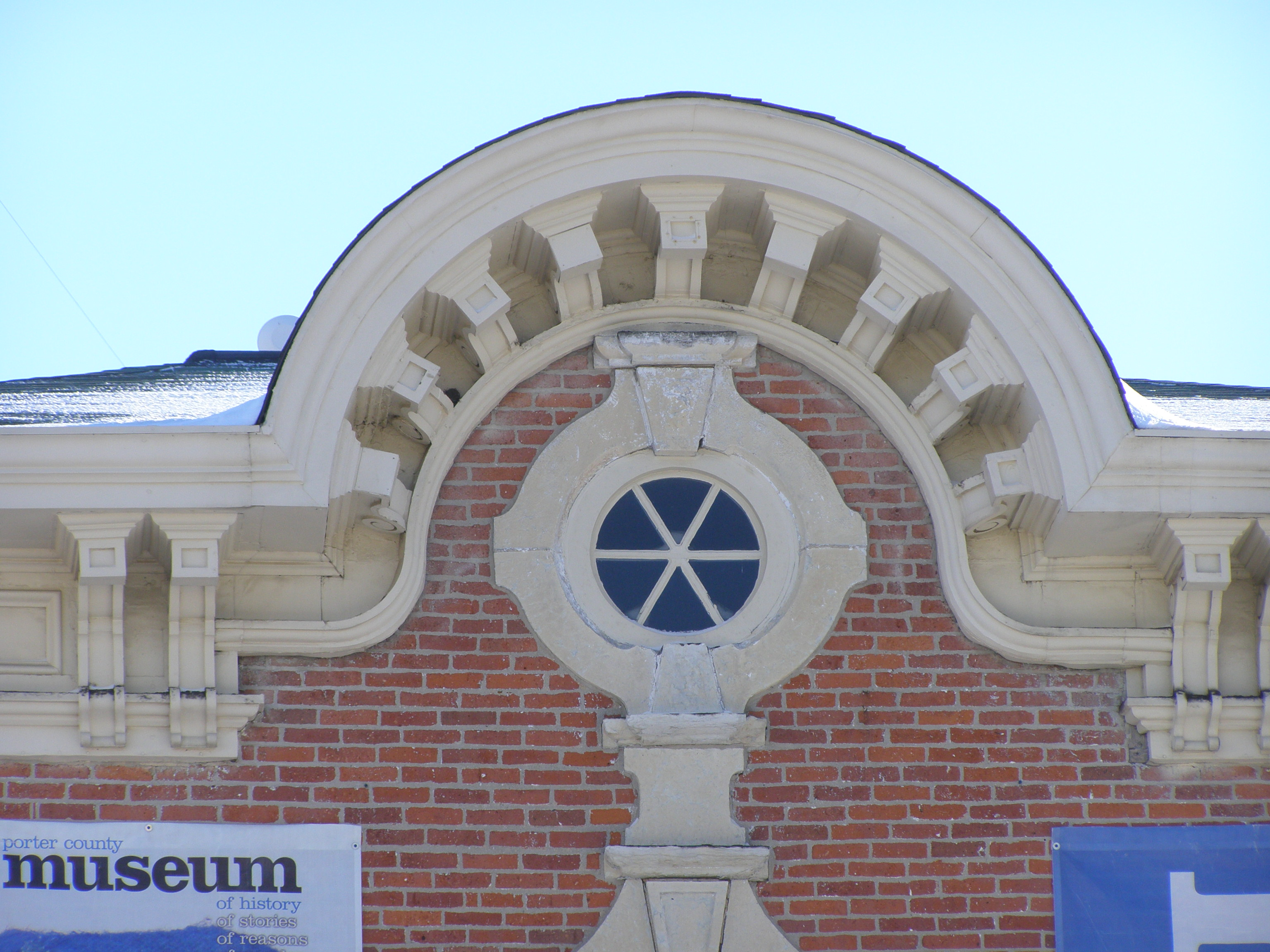
Rosette of front entrance

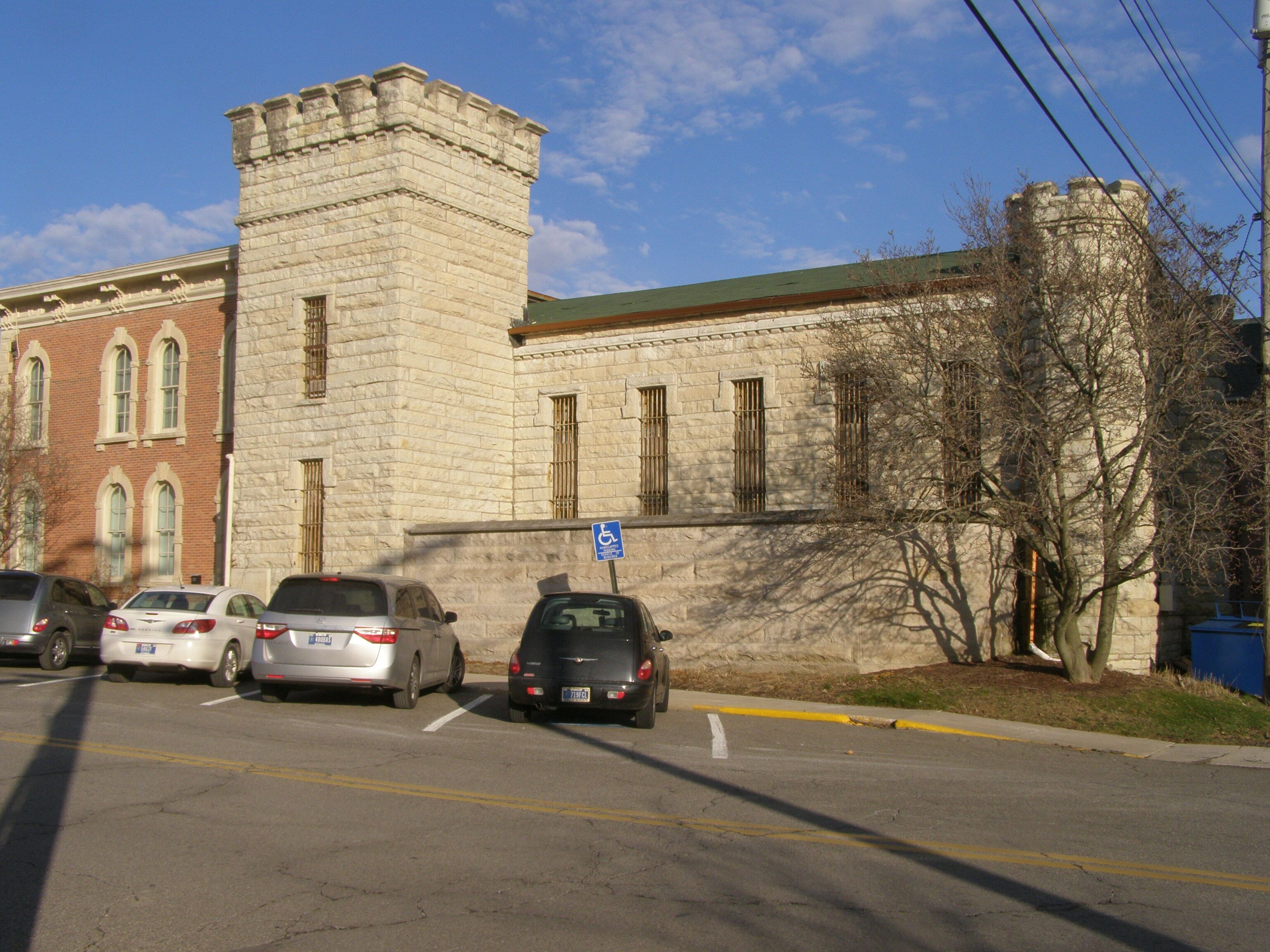
Jail with square & round towers

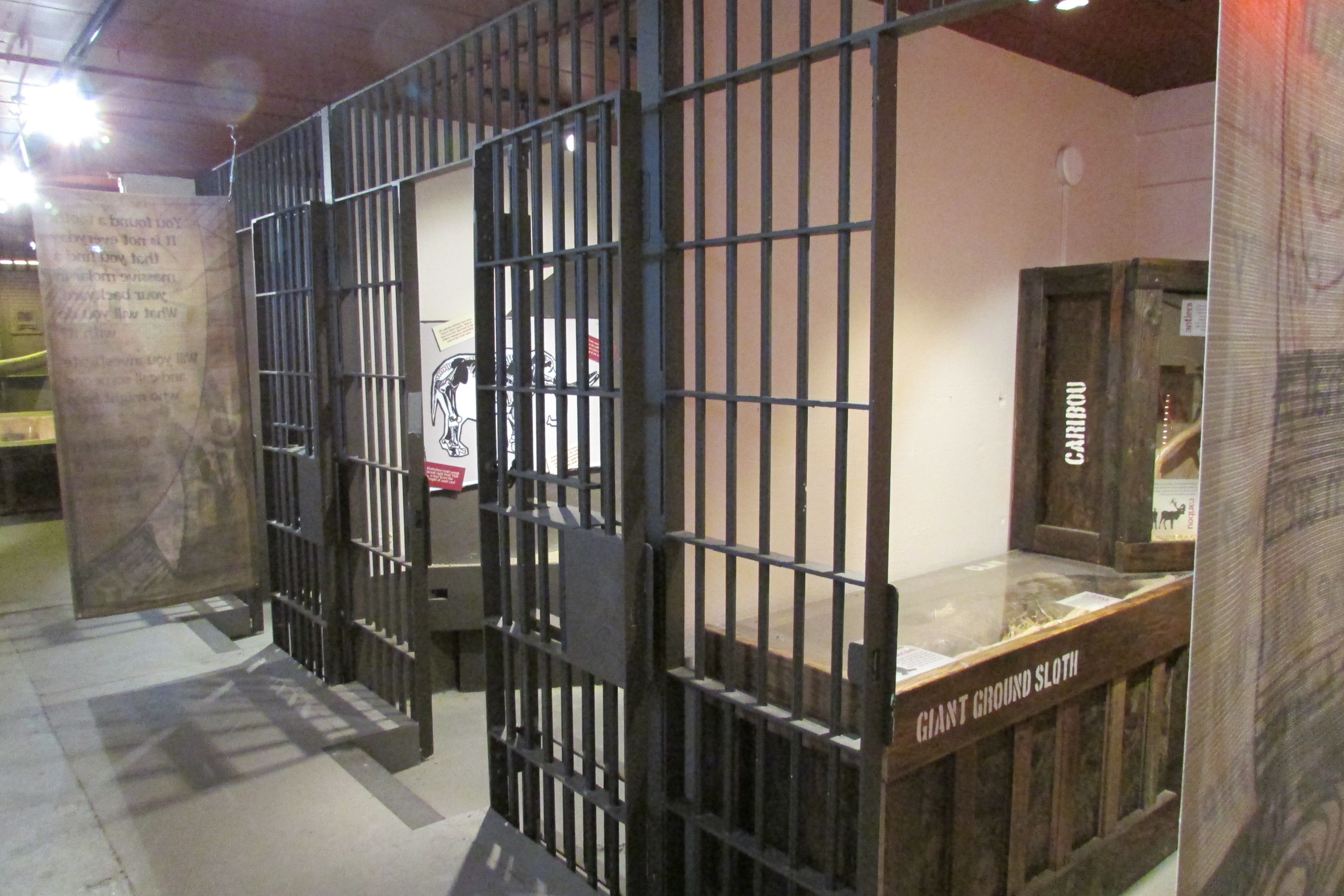
Prisoner cell

== Bibliography ==
- "Counties of Porter and Lake Indiana", Weston A. Goodspeed, Historical Editor and Charles Blanchard, Biographical Ed.; F.A. Battey & Co. 1883; Chapter, "History of Porter County", pg 23
- "History of Porter County", Volume I, Then Lewis Publishing Co; Chicago-New York; 1912, pp. 58–59.

== Footnotes ==
- Kosky, Ken. "County Crime Rate Stays same in '09". The Times. Archived from the original on January 12, 2013.
- Mullins, Lanette; Images of America; Valparaiso – Looking Back, Moving Forward; Arcadia Publishing; Chicago, Illinois; 2002
- Neeley, George E.; City of Valparaiso, A Pictorial History; G. Bradley Publishing, Inc.; St. Louis, Missouri; 1989
- Porter County Interim Report, Indiana Historic Sites and Structures Inventory; Historic Landmarks Foundation of Indiana; July 1991
