= Trail Creek (Lake Michigan) =

Trail Creek La Rivière du Chemin (River of the Trail)
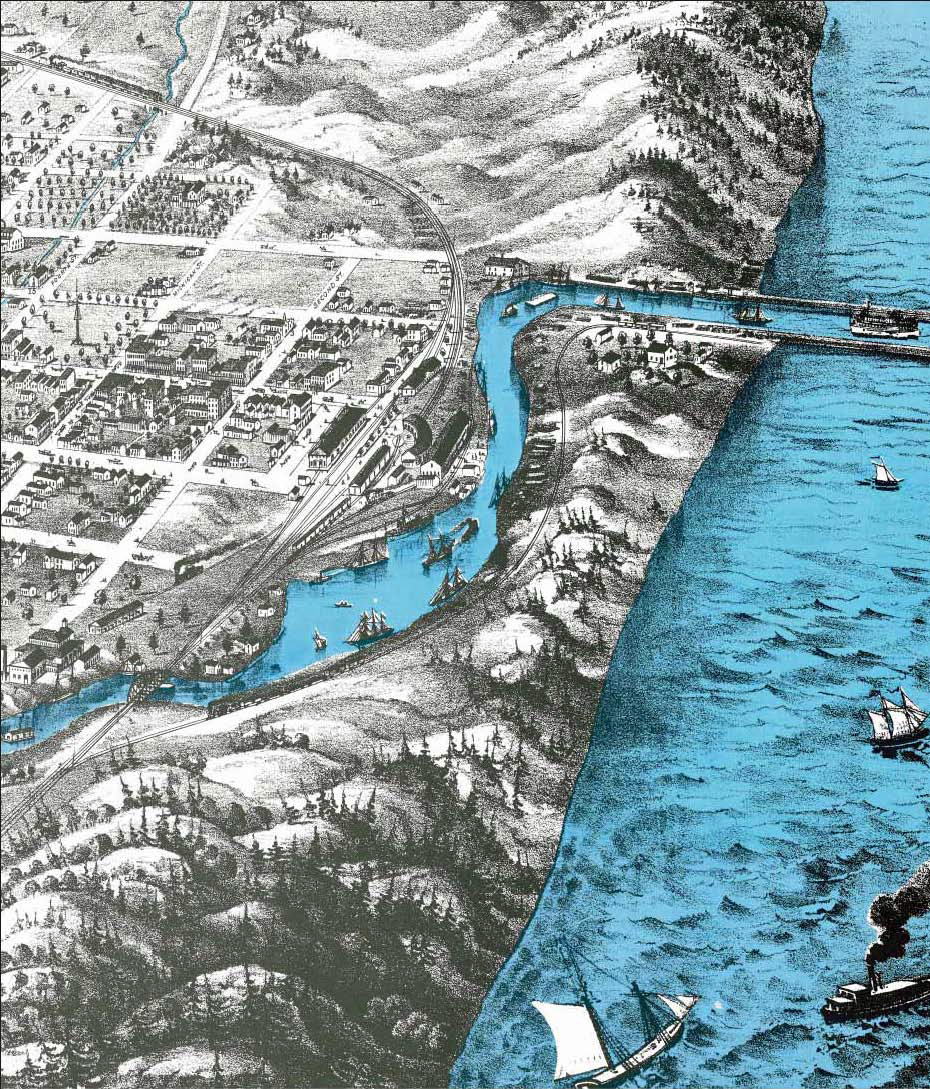
- Bird's Eye View of Michigan City, 1869, by A. Ruger (partial sketch).
- Native name: Myewes-zibiwe (Potawatomi)

Location
- Country: United States
- State: Indiana
- Region: LaPorte County
- City: Michigan City, Indiana

Physical characteristics
- Source confluence: Confluence of West Branch Trail Creek and East Branch Trail Creek
  - coordinates: 41°41′12″N 086°50′38″W
  - elevation: 610 ft (190 m)
- Mouth: Lake Michigan
  - location: Michigan City, Indiana
  - coordinates: 41°43′27″N 086°54′32″W
  - elevation: 581 ft (177 m)

Basin features
- Tributaries
  - left: West Fork Trail Creek
  - right: East Fork Trail Creek, Otter Creek

Trail Creek is a 7.3-mile-long (11.7 km) north- by northwest-flowing stream whose main stem begins at the confluence of the West Branch Trail Creek and the East Branch Trail Creek in LaPorte County, Indiana, United States. Its mouth is a Lake Michigan harbor and marina adjacent to Washington Park in Michigan City, Indiana.

== History ==
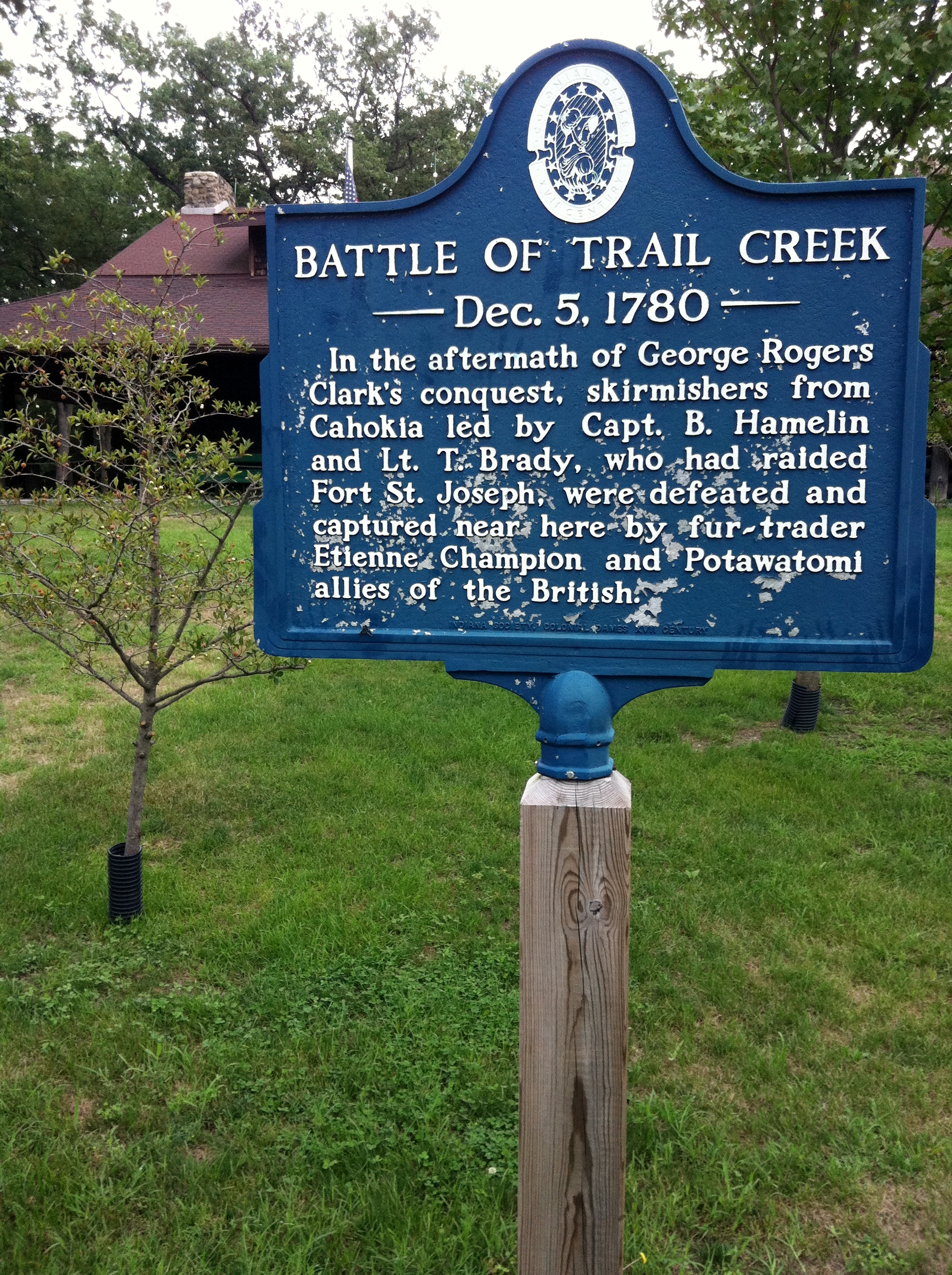
In the 1780 Battle of Trail Creek 16 Americans and Frenchmen led by Capt. Hamelin and Lt. Thomas Brady were badly defeated by the British and their Potawatomi allies.

Trail Creek is called myewes-zibiwe ("trail-creek") in the Potawatomi language. The name refers to the "Potawatomi Trail" that ran from Chicago along the south shore of Lake Michigan, along Trail Creek, then to Hudson Lake and finally to the French Fort St. Joseph and the nearby Jesuit mission (now Niles, Michigan) on the St. Joseph River. The French translated this Potawatomi name as la Rivière du Chemin (River of the Trail). From French, the name was translated on into English, leading to such names as "Road River" (1815) and "Chemin River" (1818), as well as the modern name Trail Creek.

During the 17th and 18th centuries, Trail Creek served from time to time as an escape route for raiding parties moving in or out of the Illinois River valley. During the 17th-century Beaver Wars, Iroquois (Haudenosaunee) warriors used it as an eastward escape route after attacking villages of the Illinois Confederacy. This led to an alternative French name for Trail Creek, la rivière aux Iroquois. Likewise in 1780, the creek furnished an escape route for 16 Americans and Frenchmen led by Jean-Baptiste Hamelin and Thomas Brady, who were attempting to flee back westward to Cahokia after raiding the British stockpiles at Fort St. Joseph. The ensuing battle, although sometimes called the "Battle of Trail Creek", took place at Petit Fort a day's march further west through the dunes.

In 1816 a shoreline survey indicated that Trail Creek was 30 feet (9 m) wide. At its mouth and on the harbor's western bank stood Hoosier Slide, a 200-foot-tall (60 m) sand dune The summit of the majestic dune was mantled with trees, and picnics and weddings were held there where Chicago tourists enjoyed a beautiful view of the lake and the vast lumberyards of Washington Park. Hoosier Slide was removed by sand mining from 1890 to 1920, the sand being used for glassmaking and also for landfill in Chicago's Jackson Park and for the Illinois Central Railroad right-of-way. The former site of Hoosier Slide was acquired by Northern Indiana Public Service Company (NIPSCO) to construct a coal-generating power plant in the late 1920s.

In 1832, Isaac Elston bought 160 acres (65 ha) of land including Trail Creek and the harbor, intending to build a road to homesteaders in central Indiana so that they could export farm crops to Lake Michigan. Michigan City arose from Elston's ambition. Early visitors to the region were captivated by its rugged beauty, its abundance of wildflowers and berries, and especially the majestic Hoosier Slide and other sand dunes. Incorporated in 1836, Michigan City's early prosperity was due to the flowing waters of Trail Creek which afforded good locations for lumber and gristmills. In the 1800s 13 grist mills were located on the banks of Trail Creek.

== Watershed and course ==
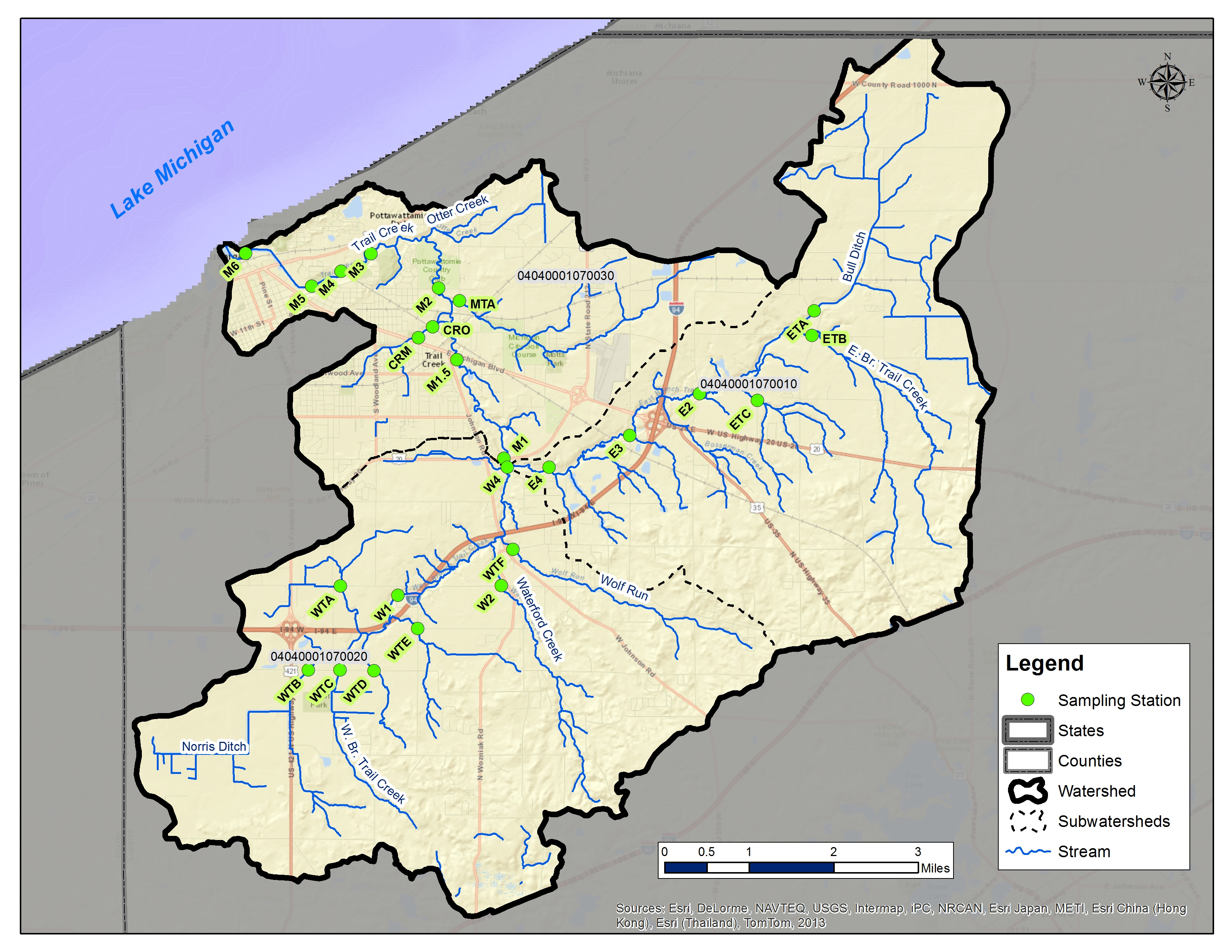
Sampling locations for Trail Creek Watershed Partnership Water Quality Monitoring Program

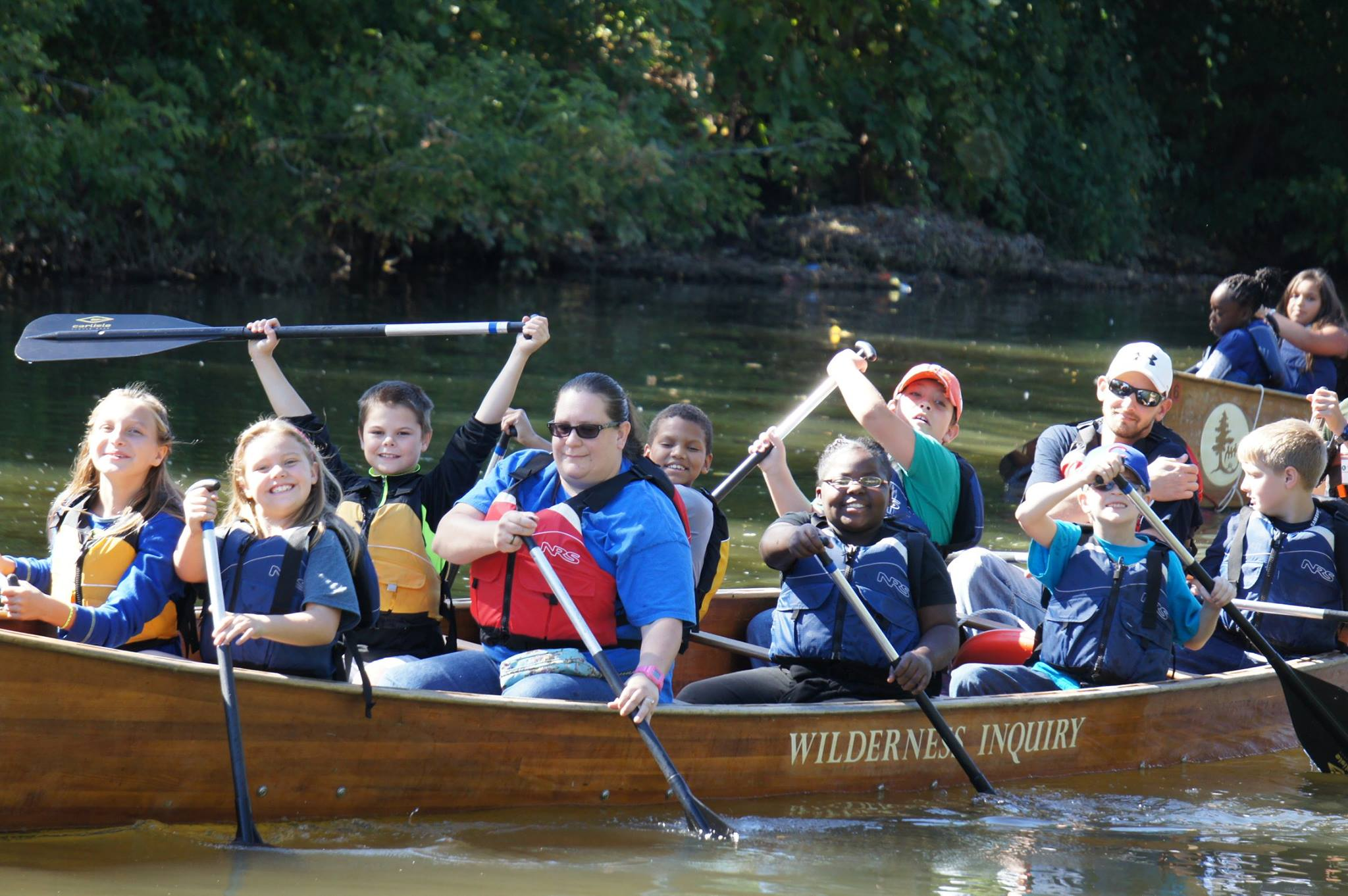
Students paddle on Trail Creek as part of Trail Creek Week

The Trail Creek Watershed, located in northwestern Indiana's LaPorte County, drains a 59.1 square mile area of mixed land uses into Lake Michigan at Michigan City, IN. The watershed comprises three sub-watersheds: The Main Branch, the East Branch and the West Branch. The Main Branch sub-watershed has the greatest amount of developed land, including commercial, industrial and residential lands. The East Branch and West Branch sub-watersheds are primarily rural in character, including a mix of row crop agriculture, livestock, hayfield, low-density development and natural areas.

Historically and to the present, Trail Creek has acted as a natural firebreak.

== Habitat and wildlife ==
Pinhook Bog in the Trail Creek Watershed was designated a National Natural Landmark in 1965 and is part of the Indiana Dunes National Lakeshore. Pinhook Bog is the only true bog in located within Indiana. A bog is a specific type of wetland that accumulates acidic peat from dead plant material. This bog was formed by glacial meltwater on a clay bed. Pinhook Bog consists of about 580 acres (230 ha), of which approximately 145 acres (59 ha) are a floating peat mat, with approximately 45 acres (18 ha) of wetland separating the bog from the adjacent uplands.

Federally threatened, endangered, or candidate species noted in LaPorte County include the Indiana bat (Myotis sodalis), the bald eagle (Haliaeetus leucocephalus), the eastern massasauga (Sistrurus catenatus catenatus), and Mitchell's satyr butterfly (Neonympha mitchellii mitchellii).

Trail Creek is one of very few Indiana streams with coldwater habitat capable of supporting salmonid (trout and salmon) spawning.

== Conservation ==
An immediate product of early efforts included the preparation and completion of the “Trail Creek Watershed Management Plan of 1993”. This report offered a multi-faceted and substantive plan focused on nonpoint sources of pollution, with recommendations to reduce sedimentation and nutrient loading to the stream of Trail Creek. Several demonstration projects including 4 streambank restoration projects and a constructed wetland for residential sewage disposal were implemented with grant monies as a result of the 1993 Trail Creek Watershed Management Plan; however long term monitoring was not implemented nor were additional grant monies sought for implementation. The Watershed Management plan stated that a “Lead Agency” needed to be identified to coordinate watershed improvement activities. In hindsight, a fatal shortcoming of the implementation of the 1993 Watershed management plan was that no “Lead Agency” was ever identified.

FOUR goals and a variety of objectives were identified within the 1993 Trail Creek Watershed Management Plan. Many of those goals and objectives remain valid with the current (2007) plan update. The goals from the 1993 Watershed Management Plan are as follows:

1. Reduce potential health hazards due to poor water quality in the stream of Trail Creek.

2. Improve aquatic life support. Increase quality/quantity of recreational opportunities to stimulate economic growth.

3. Develop a public awareness of the opportunities the stream of Trail Creek Provides.

IN DECEMBER of 2003, the Indiana Department of Environmental Management (IDEM) issued a detailed technical report regarding excessive E. coli levels in Trail Creek entitled “Trail Creek Escherichia Coli TMDL (Total Maximum Daily Load) Report.” This report indicates that for point sources of E. coli pollution, such as wastewater treatment plants, the “NPDES permitting and monitoring requirements will provide the necessary reasonable assurance that these sources are not contributing to violations of state E. coli standards.” For non-point sources of E. coli pollution, the report concludes that: “non-point sources will need to be monitored locally for implementation of BMPs (best management practices) or in providing access to watershed grants to assist in reducing non-point sources to meet the load allocations (LA) developed under this TMDL.” The preparation of this watershed management plan update is the next logical step in achieving cleaner water in northwestern LaPorte County as envisioned by IDEM in 2003.(Trail Creek Watershed Management Plan, 2007)

The Michigan City Sanitary District took on the challenge of leading the development of the Trail Creek Watershed Management Plan, approved by IDEM in April 2007, and has remained a leader in the management of the Trail Creek Watershed ever since. Michigan City Sanitary District has been monitoring the Creek since 2005. This data was used to develop the water quality goals of the 2007 Trail Creek Watershed Management Plan:

1. Meet the State Water Quality Standard for E. coli of a monthly geometric mean of 125 cfu/100 mL and a maximum daily standard of 235 cfu/100 mL;

2. Decrease sedimentation and dredging of the navigable channel. Total Suspended Solid goal of 15 mg/L;

3. Decrease nutrient loading in Trail Creek to the target concentrations (0.05 mg/L ortho-phosphorus, 0.05 mg/L total phosphorus, 0.25 to 0.1 mg/L nitrogen ammonia, 1.0 mg/L TKN, and 10 mg/L nitrate-nitrite);

4. Maintain a natural stream channel and flow

In 2011, the Trail Creek Watershed Steering Committee decided to begin the implementation of the WMP. A Section 319 grant was secured and the project began in 2012. The goals of the project were to:

1. Implement the Trail Creek watershed management plan by developing and implementing a cost-share program for BMPs in critical urban and agricultural areas identified in the plan

2. Contract with an individual to serve as an implementation coordinator to develop and administer the cost-share program

3. Achieve improved water quality through urban and agricultural BMPs

The Indiana Department of Natural Resources (IDNR) 2010 fish consumption advisory listed brown trout, carp, rock bass, smallmouth bass and walleye as group 3 or 4 (limit consumption to one meal every 1 to 2 months), with all other fish species limited to one meal per week unless a child or pregnant woman.

The Nature Conservancy protected the "Trail Creek Fen", a 37-acre (15 ha) parcel of raised graminoid fen and the sedge-covered wetland, that was donated to Save the Dunes Conservation Fund in 2005.

== Recreation ==
Boating and fishing are the most prominent uses of the Trail Creek harbor and marina. From the outlet at the marina to the E Street Bridge, the entire navigable channel is lined with residential and commercial structures, marinas and docks, and the Blue Chip casino. Creek Ridge Park located five miles east of US 421 on County Road 400 in Michigan City is also a LaPorte County park.

The Northwest Indiana Paddling Association (NWIPA) has led the recreational and stewardship efforts on Trail Creek. As a member of the Trail Creek Watershed Partnership, NWIPA has hosted an annual Trail Creek Fun Float, an annual Ride the Wave Regatta and participated in the Annual "Trail Creek Week". Trail Creek Week is a five-day, hands-on immersive educational experience.

Trail Creek is a designated trout and salmon stream, and supports one of the few remaining cold water fisheries in Indiana. In the early 1970s the Indiana Department of Natural Resources began stocking Trail Creek with Chinook salmon (Oncorhynchus tshawytscha), Coho salmon (Oncorhynchus kisutch), Skamania summer-run and winter-run steelhead (Oncorhynchus mykiss). As of the end of 2010 Trail Creek had produced the Indiana state record Chinook salmon (caught by Rich Baker in 1980 and weighed 38 pounds) and the state record Steelhead Trout (caught by Evan Nicholson in 1999 and weighing 26.62 pounds). The creek also had the state record Brown trout (Salmo trutta) (caught in 1999 by Steven Bay and weighing 24.18 pounds) until 2006 when a larger one (26.06 pounds) was caught in Lake Michigan itself. Trail Creek also supports other native game and non-game fish species.

== See also ==
- History of the Indiana Dunes
- Indiana Dunes National Park
- List of rivers of Indiana
