= Petit Fort =

Historical Structure in Indiana, United States

- Petit Fort
- Porter, Indiana
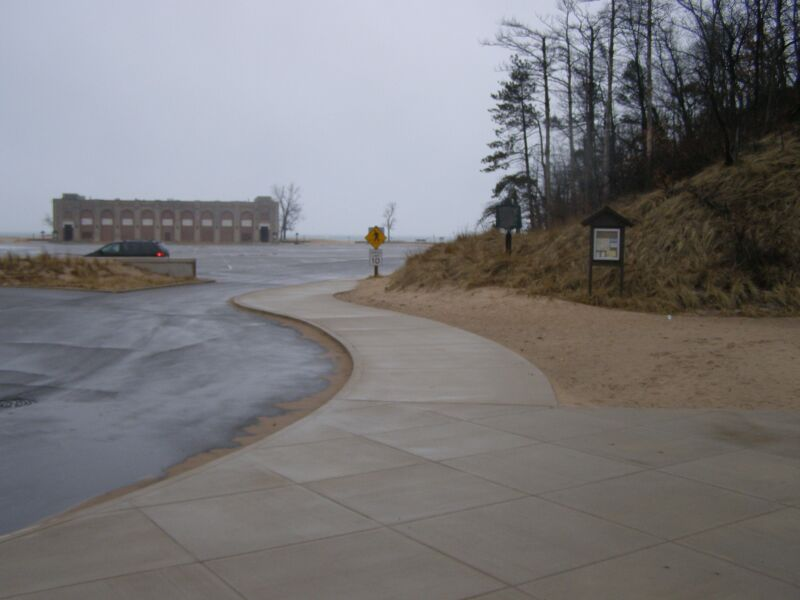
- Location of Petit Fort (signs on the right) on Lake Michigan, which is south of the Bathhouse

Location
- Coordinates: 41.660798°N 87.062359°W

Site history
- Built: 18th century
- Built by: French
- In use: Fur Trade Post
- Demolished: 1779
- Battles/wars: American Revolution

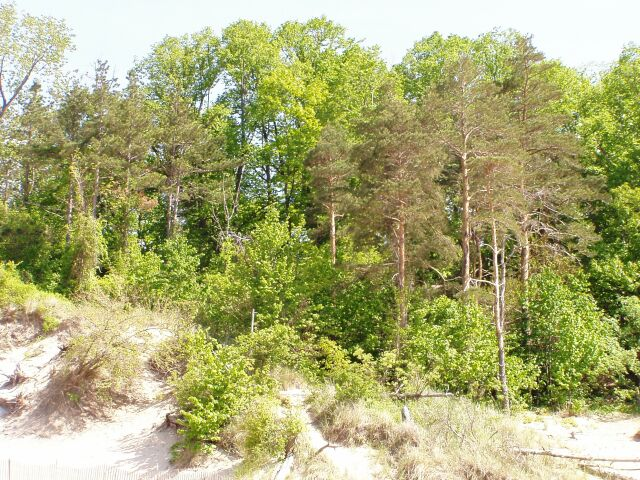
East side of the bathhouse parking lot by the Dunes Creek Restoration

Petit Fort was a structure located in northwestern Indiana, in or near the Indiana Dunes, near the mouth of Fort Creek, now known as Dunes Creek. It may have been a French military outpost, but was more likely a private residence, trading post, or at most a support station for larger forts in the area. The National Park Service refers to it as a "fur depot."

The fort came under the dominion of the British following their ultimate victory in the French and Indian War. It is unclear whether the British ever really utilized Petit Fort; at best it was a station for British fur traders. It was abandoned in 1779 as American settlers rebelled and Great Britain consolidated power in more fortified strongholds.

There are few records of Petit Fort, it being mentioned in only a few letters and at least one map. "Petit Fort" is, in fact, a description rather than a proper name, translating literally to "small fort". It is remembered primarily due to a small military action that occurred there during the American Revolution.

== Battle of Petit Fort ==
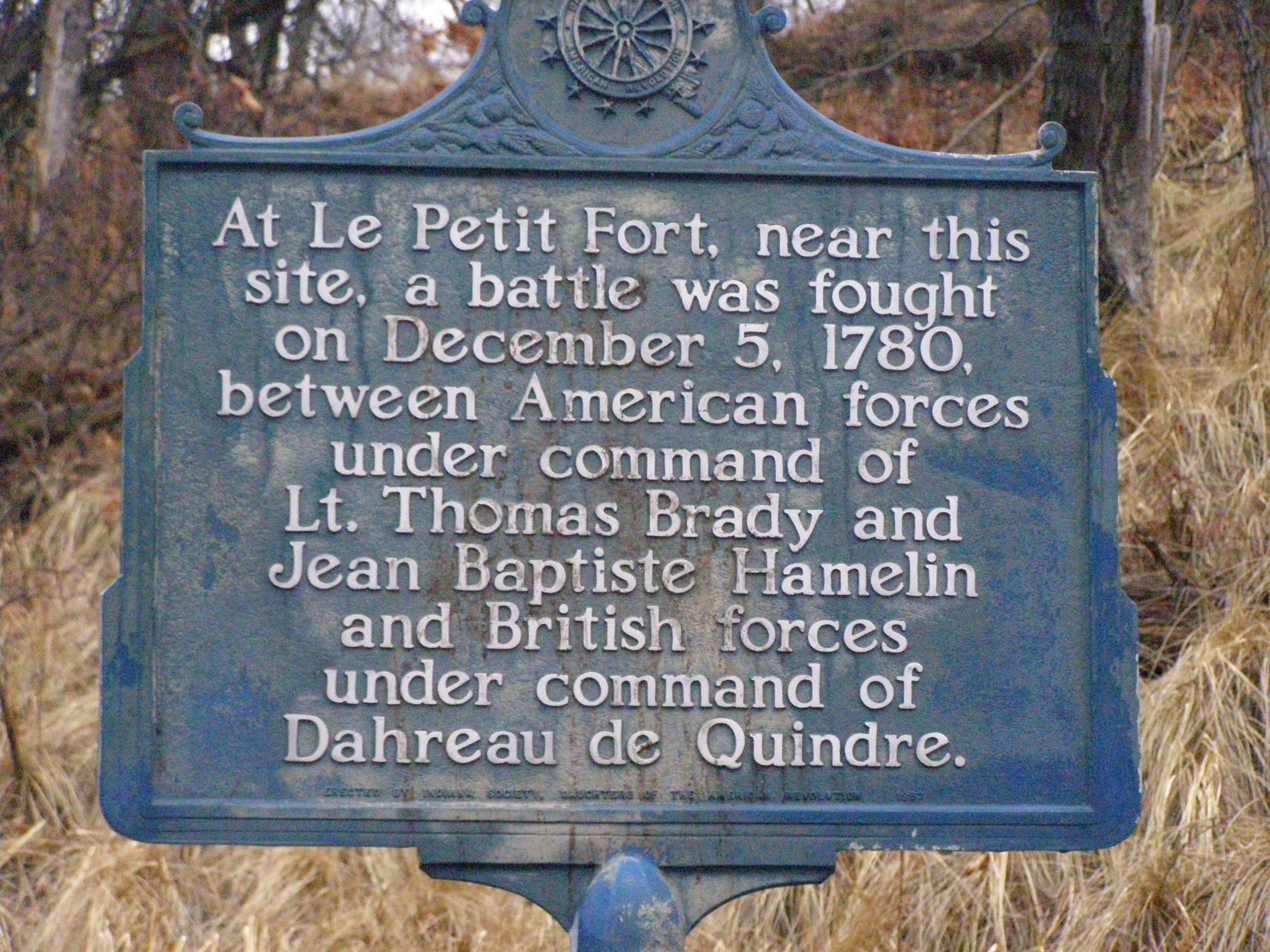
Le Petit Fort along Dunes Creek at Indiana Dunes State Park

In late Autumn 1780, a small band of about fourteen Métis from Cahokia, Illinois, under orders from Augustin de La Balme, set out for British-controlled Fort St. Joseph in southwest Michigan, led by Jean-Baptiste Hamelin and Lt. Thomas Brady, a former British officer and Indian Agent who now supported the rebelling Americans. The party recruited from frontier settlements along the way, and doubled in size to about thirty men. The company travelled up the Illinois River and Kankakee River, portaged near modern-day South Bend, Indiana, and continued down the St. Joseph River to Fort St. Joseph, which they plundered. The raid was timed while local Indians would be away hunting, but La Balme also hoped to create a distraction for his journey up the Wabash River to attack Fort Detroit.

The raiders returned by way of the Sauk Trail with pack-horses loaded down with plunder, mostly trade furs. British Lt. Dagreaux Du Quindre, however, learned of the raid and quickly formed a band of loyalist traders and Potawatomi under Chief Anaquiba and his son, Topinabee. They followed Brady's company and overtook it at the sandy dunes South of Lake Michigan. A race ensued for miles through the dunes, until the raiders took up defensive positions at Petit Fort. Major DePeyster reported the action 8 January 1781 in a letter to General Henry Watson Powell:

A Detachment from the Cahokias, consisting of sixteen men only, commanded by a half Indian named Jean Baptiste Hammelain, timed it so as to arrive at St. Joseph's with Pack Horses, when the Indians were out on their first Hunt, an old Chief and his family excepted. They took the Traders Prisoners, and carried off all the goods, consisting of at least Fifty Bales, and took the Route of Chicagou. Lieut. Dagreaux Du Quindre, who I had stationed near St. Josephs, upon being informed of it, immediately assembled the Indians, and pursued them as far as the petite Fort, a days Journey beyond the Riviere Du Chemin where on the 5th December, he summoned them to surrender, on their refusing to do it he ordered the Indians to attack them. Without a loss of a man on his side, killed four, wounded two, and took seven Prisoners, the other Three escaped in the thick Wood. Three of the Prisoners were brought in here amongst whom is Brady a Superintendent of Indian affairs. The rest he suffered the Indians to take to M. Makina. I look upon these Gentry as Robbers and not Prisoners of war, having no commission, that I can learn, other than a verbal order from Mons. Trottier an Inhabitant of the Cahoes . . .
