= Madam La Compt =

American literary biography

Madam La Compt is a legendary figure in the Pioneer History of Illinois written by John Reynolds (1788–1865). The book tells the stories of the early settlers of Illinois, based on Reynolds' own memories. Reynolds claims to have known La Compt for 30 years, but his La Compt is semi-fictional, a composite of the lives of three women — a daughter, mother, and grandmother — one of whom was "Mme. Le Comte".

The three generations of women who inspired Reynold's Madam La Compt include Mme. Marie Joseph Le Compte, her daughter, Marie Josette, and mother, Marie Josephte, and perhaps her grandmother, Marie Magdeleine. Although much of these women's lives are centered in Fort St. Joseph, Fort Michilimackinac, and Cahokia, it began in the late 17th century in the frontier of New France with Symphorosa Ouaouaboukoue, a Native American woman, likely a Menominee, and Jean Baptiste Réaume, parents of Marie Magdeleine. French government in Quebec operated forts throughout the territory for fur trading. This family engaged in the fur trade and supplied food and goods to fur traders and the forts. As they navigated through their lives, many indigenous people were their friends, some were enemies of the forts, where more people lived with families. Later generations lived in Cahokia, a settlement on the Mississippi River, across from what is now St. Louis, Missouri. It was an important fur trading center and along the fur trade river network within New France.

== Legend ==
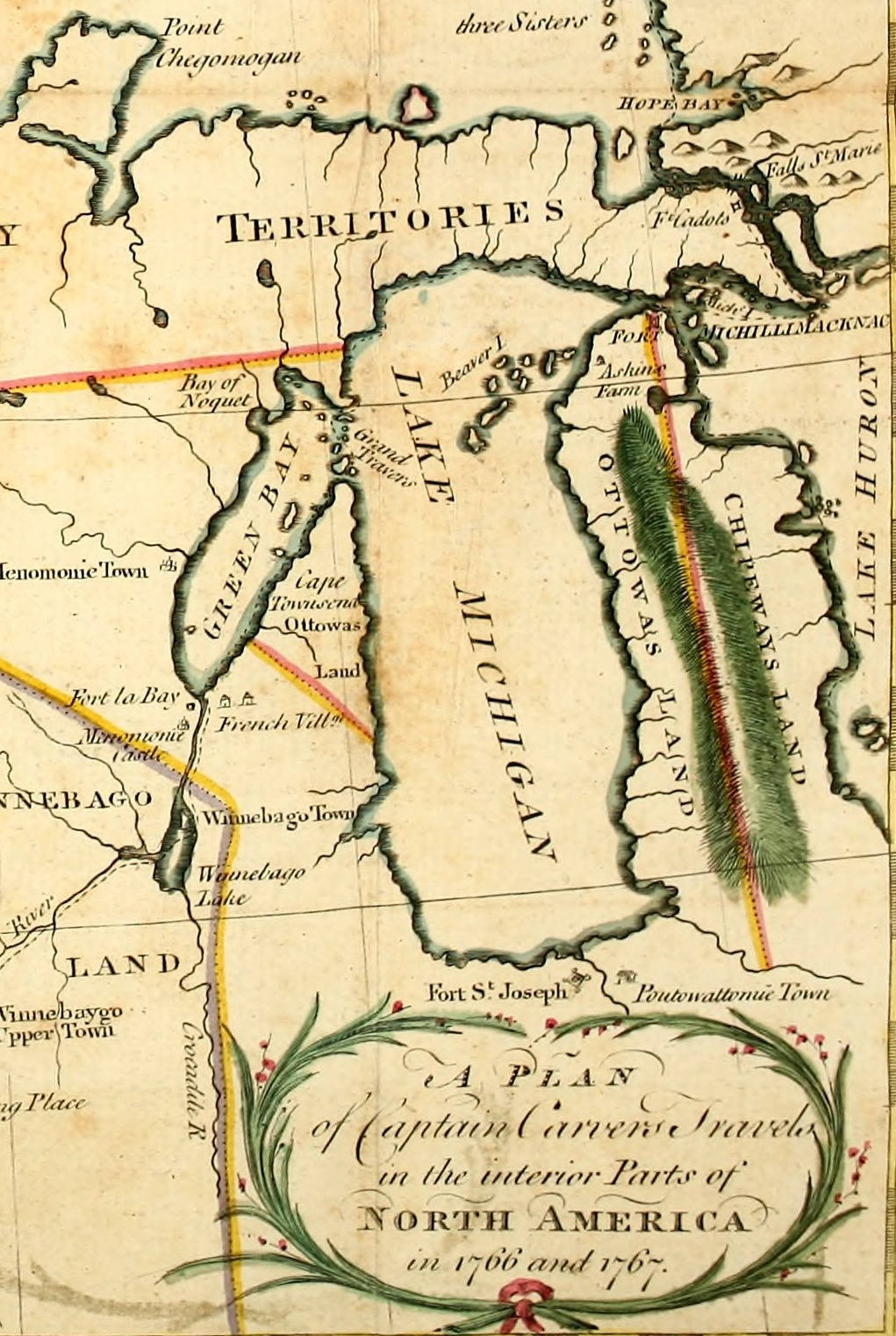
Madam La Compte was born in Fort St. Joseph, New France of Canada, then lived in Mackinac between Lake Huron and Lake Michigan, both of which were part of New France of Canada when she lived there and ultimately became the state of Michigan. From about 1765, she lived in an area west of Lake Michigan, 50 years before the city of Chicago was founded.

"Madam La Compt" appears in the Pioneer History of Illinois written by the former Governor of Illinois, John Reynolds (1788–1865). The book is based on Reynolds' memories and contains many factual errors. According to Reynolds, the woman who became "Madam La Compt" was born in 1734 at Fort St. Joseph, New France of Canada. She married three times, first to Pelate Sainte Ange and they moved to the Chicago area. In 1780, she married Monsier La Compt, a French Canadian, at Cahokia. They had a lot of children. After her second husband's death, she married Thomas (Tom) Brady.

Her neighbors, living along the lakes, included Potawatomi, Kickapoo people, and other neighboring Native American tribes. She became influential among the tribes, by learning their languages, requesting their opinions, and looking out for their interests. When warned multiple times of impending attacks on white settlements, she went to the tribe's encampment and stayed there while she mediated for the ending of the planned attack.

On one night she met several hundred warriors near the French village at Quentin Mound, where they had camped. At times like these, she might stay with them several days as they talked through their grievances. The inhabitants of the village were often waiting, with their arms in their hands, ready for defence; when they would see this extraordinary woman escorting to the village a great band of warriors, changed from war to peace. The Indians were painted black, indicating the sorrow they entertained for their hostile movements against their friends. The Indians feasted for days, in the villages. They would remain in peace for some time after these reconciliations. Madam La Compt died in Cahokia in 1843.

The story was repeated in Henry McCormick's The women of Illinois in 1913, where she was called the "Frontier Angel", (Note: This biography calls her "Mrs. Le Compt".) in Adolph Suess's The romantic story of Cahokia, Illinois in 1947 (Note: This biography calls her "Madame Le Compte" and "Madame La Compte") and in Illinois historical publications. The Illinois State Historical Society stated that the events occurred during the Revolutionary War (1775 to 1783) and until 1795.

== Doubts on its authenticity ==
Ulrich Danckers wrote that John Reynolds created a legend of "Madam La Compt" that was actually about her daughter, Marie Joseph La Marche, who lived with her husband Louis Le Compte from about 1772 to 1808. All three women — Marie Josephte L'Archevêque (born ca. 1733), Marie Joseph La Marche (Mme Le Comte, born 1753), and Marie Josette Languedoc (born ca. 1773) — died by the time he published the book in 1859.

John Francis McDermott wrote in 1949 that he believed "Madam La Compt" is based upon Marie Josephte L'Archevêque and Marie Joseph La Marche. (Note: In his book, McDermott states that the surnames "Comte, LeComte, LeCompt, etc. are interchangeable.") Besides the two or three women, Reynolds' adventurous story may also include experiences of Mme. Le Compte's grandmother and her second husband Louis-Therese Chevalier, both leaders in the St. Joseph community.

Reynolds moved to Illinois in 1800 and came to know Marie Joseph La Marche, whose second husband was Louis Le Compte, and Marie Josette Languedoc, her daughter with Joseph Languedoc.

Fort St. Joseph, Fort Michilimackinac, and Cahokia figure in the lives of the women. There is no evidence, though, that the women lived in Chicago. Marie Josette Languedoc's brother-in-law Louis lived there. The husbands of "Madam La Compt" are men in Mme. Le Comte's life. Her husband was Louis Le Comte. Thomas Brady was her step-father and Michel Pilet dit St. Ange was her son-in-law.

== Inspiration ==
=== Marie Magdeleine Réaume ===
==== Early life ====
Marie Magdeleine Réaume (born c. 1714) was the daughter of a Native American woman, likely a Menominee, Symphorosa Ouaouaboukoue and Jean Baptiste Réaume. Before their marriage, Jean Baptiste worked in the fur trade at Fort St. Joseph, in the western frontier of New France until 1696 when French royalty banned the trade. In order to survive, he traded in furs illicitly. He married Symphorosa Ouaouaboukoue before 1714 after which their daughter Marie Magdeleine was born in Illinois Country. Those who had married indigenous women were able to survive by trade furs with their relatives. Although he could be imprisoned if caught by the French, Réaume continued to trade in this way until the ban was lifted in 1717. After that, Jean Baptiste, his wife, and daughter moved to the Green Bay (La Baye) post, where another daughter was born. Jean Baptiste was the post interpreter.

==== Marriage to Augustine L'Archevêque ====
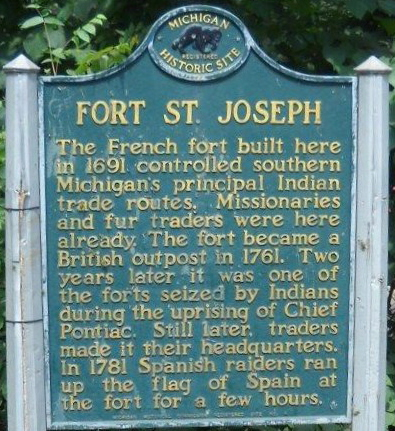
Fort St. Joseph marker

Marie Magdeleine married Augustine L'Archevêque, whose parents, Catherine Delauney and Jean L'Archevêque, had six sons who were all traders in Illinois and Canada. Augustine was a fur trader throughout Illinois Country. Marie Magdeleine and Augustine lived at Fort St. Joseph and were parents of a son and four or more daughters, including Marie Josephte L'Archevêque. Augustine died before July 1748.

St. Joseph was located along the St. Joseph River, which provided transportation by canoe to Illinois Country to Lake Michigan. During fall rains and spring snow run-off, St. Joseph River and its valley flooded and people could canoe along a network of rivers — St. Joseph, Kankakee, and Illinois Rivers — to the Mississippi River. Along the network were French forts for trade routes and to prevent British from establishing themselves in New France territory.

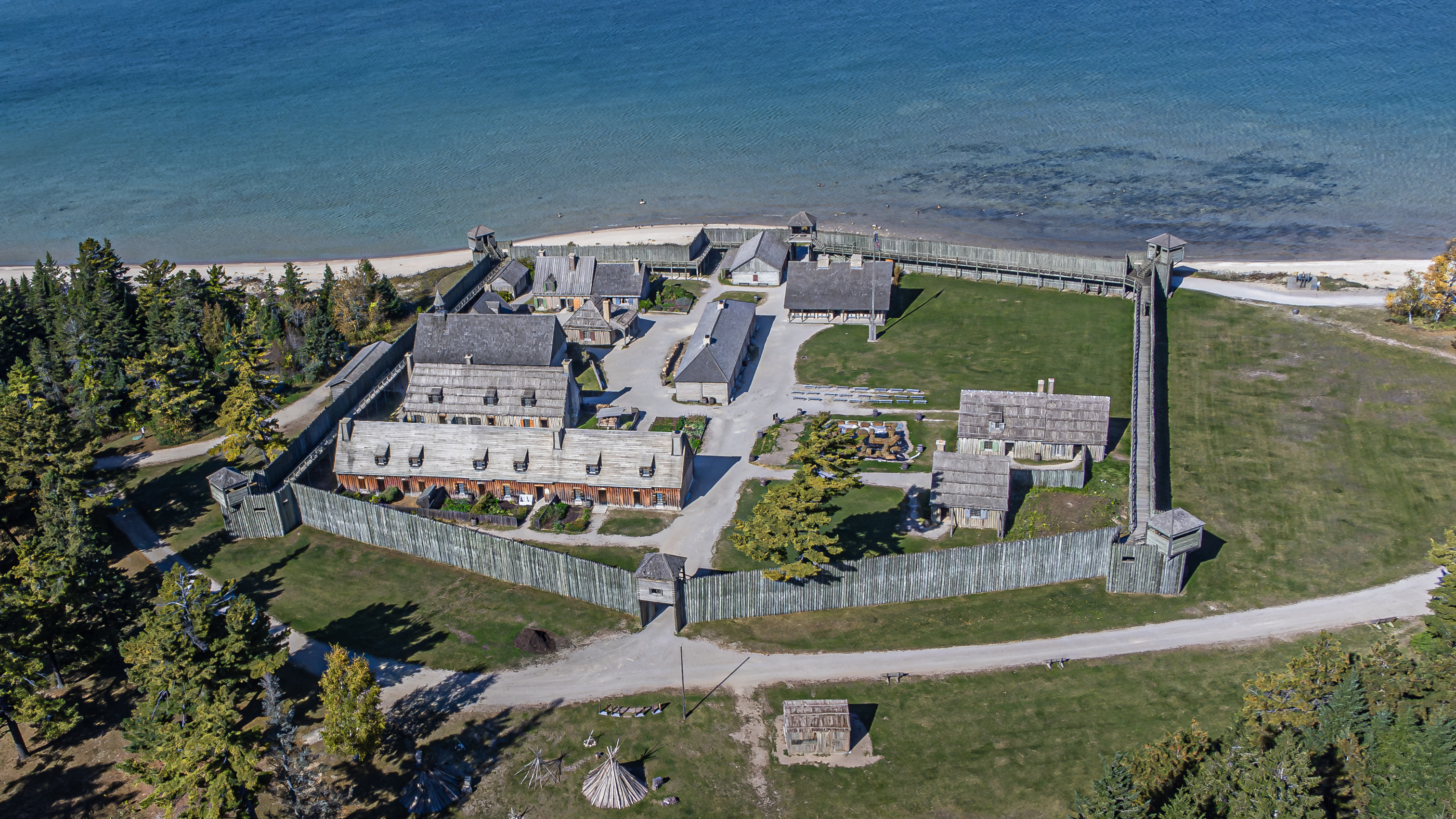
Fort Michilimackinac

After Augustine's death, Marie Magdeleine grew vegetables and grains that she sold to fur traders and the fort. She also raised livestock, and made goods, including a bark canoe and snowshoes, that were sold to the fort. Some of it was used to supply indigenous allies in fights against other tribes. She had enslaved laborers that worked in the fields. In 1748, she took a long trip to Fort Michilimackinac, where two of her daughters were married and her son was baptized. The family, including her sons-in-law returned to her home with her to expand the supply of food to the fur traders.

==== Marriage to Louis-Therese Chevalier ====
Louis-Therese Chevalier, one of seventeen Chevalier children, most of whose families were part of the Michilimackinac fur trade, was married to an Odawa woman when Marie, an attractive 41-year-old woman, became pregnant with Louis' son. They were married at the mission at St. Joseph. Their marriage meant for a more comfortable life and access to furs for Marie Magdeleine and her family. The L'Archevêque and Chevalier families became intertwined as Louis' brother married Marie Magdeleine's daughter and another daughter, age 21, married a 45-year-old widow named Chevalier from Montreal. The daughters all stayed connected with St. Joseph when Marie Magdeleine's 17 year-old daughter married a fur trader. The family lines grew closer as Marie Magdeleine and Louis' became godparents to one another's grandchildren.

After their marriage, Marie Magdeleine and Louis lived at St. Joseph and Marie, in particular, lived her life as a lay person of the Catholic faith. Just was she was concerned about her children's religious life, she was concerned about indigenous people at the fort's Jesuit mission. Two of her daughters who were not baptized as children chose their mother to be their godmother and Louis was chosen as godfather by another daughter. Marie Magdeleine was the godmother to a middle-aged Potawatomi woman and a thirteen-year old enslaved girl. Marie Magdeleine cared that a Miami couple had the priest bless their marriage, in addition to their traditional wedding ceremony.

Like the native women in the area, Mary Magdeleine and her daughters were responsible for growing and harvesting crops. Her daughters and her family lived with her until they left the area. About the early 1770s, before the start of the American Revolutionary War, Mary Magdeleine had more food than she needed for herself and to sell in the area. She gave some away and sent furs and food through fur traders to sell in Detroit to Michilimackinac.

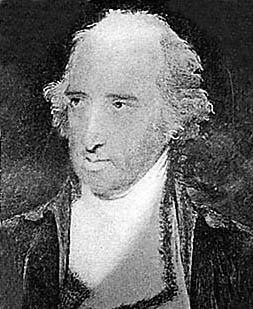
British Lieutenant Governor Henry Hamilton

Louis negotiated for peace between Native Americans and the British after the end of the French and Indian War (1754–1763), when the French were defeated. Their relationship became complicated in the days leading up to the Revolutionary War and as Louis tried to thwart the British emergence in the fur trade in the area. Louis planned a visit with Gros Loup to meet British Lieutenant Governor Henry Hamilton in Detroit in 1778. Loup went with Hamilton during his August 6 to October 27, 1778 voyage along the upper Maumee River during the war. Hamilton planned to stage an attack against St. Louis from St. Louis, but needed Native American allies to be successful.

Marie Magdeleine and Louis were noted diplomats to Native Americans and Louis led the community at St. Joseph. They were also "celebrated personalities" and Lieutenant Governor Patrick Sinclair was distrustful about Marie Magdelein and Louis because of their relationship with Native Americans and had them moved with 14 other families to Fort Michilimackinac in 1780. Reynolds may have used his knowledge of their adventures for "Madame La Compte."

=== Marie Josephte L'Archevêque ===
Marie Josephte Esther L'Archevêque, also called Josette, born at Fort St. Joseph about 1733. She was baptised there January 1, 1734. (Note: Malchelosse incorrectly stated that Marie Josephte L'Archevêque was born there in 1743.)

Marie Josephte, a French Canadian, was married three times. She was married in 1748, at 15, to Jacques Bariso de la Marche. He was related to a merchant in Montreal with whom Marie Josephte's father Augustine had traded. That had three sons and their daughter Marie Joseph was born at St. Joseph after July 28, 1753 She was the only of her sisters to be baptized at Michilimackinac. Her husband died.

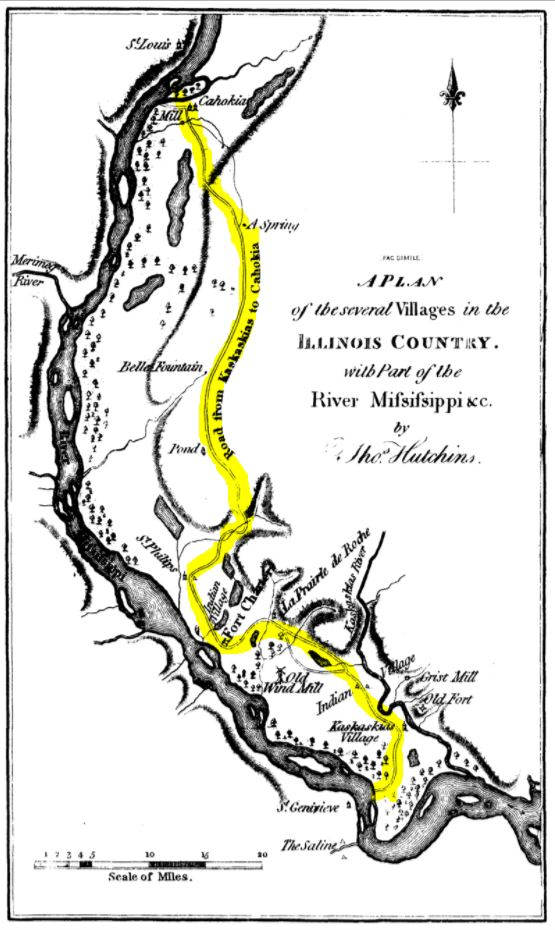
Yellow highlighted map image of the "Road from Kaskaskias to Cahokia" from the 1778 Thomas Hutchins map "Several Villages in the Illinois Country with Part of the River Mississippi". Printed in Francis Parkman's The Conspiracy of Pontiac and the Indian War after the Conquest of Canada.

As the families of the L'Archevêque's sisters grew, they began moving west to Cahokia, which further expanded their fur trading ties into Illinois. This started with the two eldest sisters and their families. Godparents and godchildren continued to form relationships within and between the Chevalier and L'Archevêque family lines.

Marie Josephte married a second time to Charles Leboeuf (le Boeuf) dit Laflamme. They had children together and when he died they were still minors. She lived in Cahokia in 1772 when Joseph Languedoc married her daughter Marie Joseph La Marche on January 16. In 1790, two of their children were living in Cahokia. Daughter Esther was dead by October 1, 1794. Her son Phillippe Laflamme came of age about 1783.

Thomas Brady moved to Cahokia in 1776 and Marie L'Archevêque entered into a marriage contract with him on June 8, 1779. Lieutenant Governor Patrick Sinclair had Marie Josephte's mother and step-father, Marie Magdelein and Louis-Therese Chevalier, considered traders to the British, were removed from St. Joseph to Fort Michilimackinac in 1780 with 14 other families. The British, however, were unable to find Loyalists of the remaining St. Joseph residents for the attack on St. Louis. In addition, Magdeleine's "kin network" of relatives, including her daughters and sons-in-law from Cahokia wanted to fight the British. From the network of relatives, son-in-law, Thomas Brady, and Jean Baptiste Hamelin, planned and led an attack in December 1780 against the British at St. Joseph, where they were successful against the soldiers at the fort, packed up what they could carry, and set fire to the rest of the British supplies and holdings. As Brady, Hamelin, and their soldiers headed back to Illinois, they were caught by British Lieutenant Dequindre and his soldiers. Four of the men from Cahokia were killed and two were wounded. Of ten captured, seven were taken to Michilimackinac. Brady and two French Canadian soldiers were taken to Detroit. He escaped the British and returned to Cahokia. Brady was considered "the hero of an attack on Fort St. Joseph". (Note: February 12, 1781, the Spanish organized another attack on St. Joseph. It was guided by Magdeleine's son Louis Chevalier, who also negotiated with the Potawatomi to allow the attack. There were between 65 and 100 men from Cahokia and St. Louis and perhaps 80 Native American men. They successfully defeated the British, destroyed St. Joseph, and quashed plans for an attack on St. Louis.)

Brady was St. Clair County's first sheriff, an Indian Commissioner, and judge. He purchased land in what is now East St. Louis, Illinois. Near the Cahokia Mounds, he built a residence there by 1775. Brady married Josephine Charlier, who died on October 1, 1794 and was buried at Cahokia.

=== Marie Joseph La Marche (Mme Le Comte) ===
Marie Joseph La Marche was born at St. Joseph after July 28, 1753, baptized July 4, 1756. She was married three times, and lived at Cahokia throughout the marriages. She first married Joseph Languedoc on January 16, 1772. Her second marriage, which made her the real "Mme Le Comte", was to Louis Le Comte on January 27, 1775. He was from the Ange-Gardien parish, Quebec. They had not lived at Chicagou. Louis was still alive on January 21, 1808. Reynolds knew both of the Le Comtes. She probably died before 1843.

=== Marie Josette Languedoc ===
Marie Josette Languedoc, the daughter of Marie Joseph La Marche and Joseph Languedoc, was born in Cahokia about 1773. She married Michel Pilet dit St. Ange in Cahokia on May 1, 1791. Michel Pilet was born in Montreal, perhaps in 1762. Louis Pilet, Michel's brother, lived in Chicagou and Peoria where he was a customer of John Kinzie from 1802 to 1821 and was likely known to Reyonds for his land claim transactions. He is sometimes referred to his surname as Petelle and Pettle. Michel died February 5, 1810. Marie died in 1843.

== Bibliography ==
- Barnhart, John Donald; Hamilton, Henry (1951). Henry Hamilton and George Rogers Clark in the American Revolution, with the unpublished Journal of Henry Hamilton. Crawfordsville, Indiana: R. E. Banta. pp. 111, 227.
- Belting, Natalia Maree (1948). Kaskaskia under the French regime. Urbana: University of Illinois Press.
- Danckers, Ulrich (2000). A compendium of the early history of Chicago : to the year 1835 when the Indians laft. River Forest, Illinois: Early Chicago, Inc. pp. 227–228. ISBN 978-0-9675823-0-6.
- Illinois Catholic Historical Society (1920). Illinois Catholic Historical Review (1918 - 1929). Chicago: Illinois Catholic Historical Society. pp. 208–209.
- Illinois State Historical Society (1915). Journal of the Illinois State Historical Society. Springfield, Illinois State Historical Society. p. 289.
- Malchelosse, Gérard (1958). "Le Poste de la Rivière Saint-Joseph (Mich.) (1691-1781)". Les Cahiers des Dix (23): 139. doi:10.7202/1079961ar.
- McCormick, Henry (1913). The women of Illinois. Bloomington, Illinois: Pantagraph printing and stationery company. pp. 15–17.
- McDermott, John Francis (1949). Old Cahokia : a narrative and documents illustrating the first century of its history. St. Louis : St. Louis Historical Documents Foundation.
- New faces of the fur trade : selected papers of the Seventh North American Fur Trade Conference, Halifax, Nova Scotia, 1995. East Lansing: Michigan State University Press. 1998. ISBN 978-0-87013-434-0.
- Osborne, Georgia L.; Carter, Julia Wolcott; Bancroft, Emily Adams (1925). "Pioneer Women of Morgan County". Journal of the Illinois State Historical Society. 18 (1): 228–256. ISSN 0019-2287. JSTOR 40187262.
- Osborne, Georgia L. (Georgia Lou); Scott, Emma B. (Emma Barker); Illinois State Historical Library (1932). Brief biographies of the figurines on display in the Illinois state historical library. Springfield, Illinois: Printed by authority of the state of Illinois. p. 23.
- Reynolds, John (1852). Pioneer History of Illinois. Belleville, Illinois: N. A. Randall.
- Suess, Adolph B. (1947). The romantic story of Cahokia, Illinois. Belleville, Illinois: Buechler Printing Co.
