= Fort St. Joseph (Niles, Michigan) =

Fort and mission in Michigan

Fort Saint Joseph
- Niles, Michigan
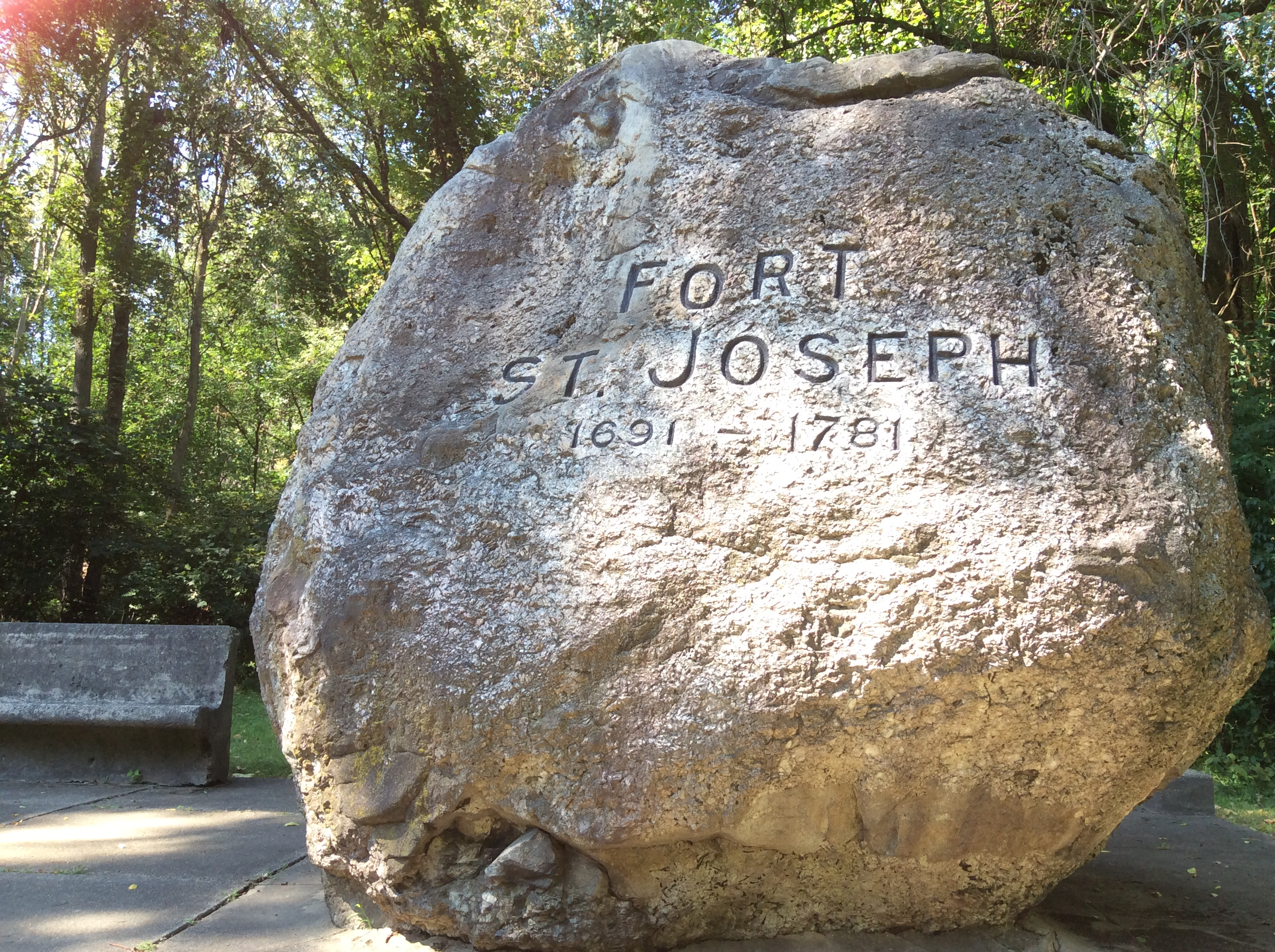
- Monument at the former site of the fort

Location
- Coordinates: 41.813675°N 86.262288°W

Site history
- Built: 1691
- Built by: French
- In use: Fur Trade Post
- Demolished: 1795
- Battles/wars: American Revolution
- Events: Pontiac's Rebellion, Raid of 1780 and Raid of 1781
- Fort St. Joseph Site (20BE23)
- U.S. National Register of Historic Places
- Michigan State Historic Site
- Location within Michigan Location within the United States
- Location: Niles, Michigan
- Coordinates: 41°48′49″N 86°15′44″W
- NRHP reference No.: 73000944

Significant dates
- Added to NRHP: May 24, 1973
- Designated MSHS: February 18, 1956

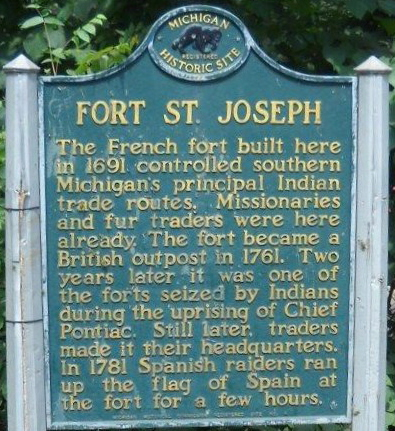
Michigan historical marker

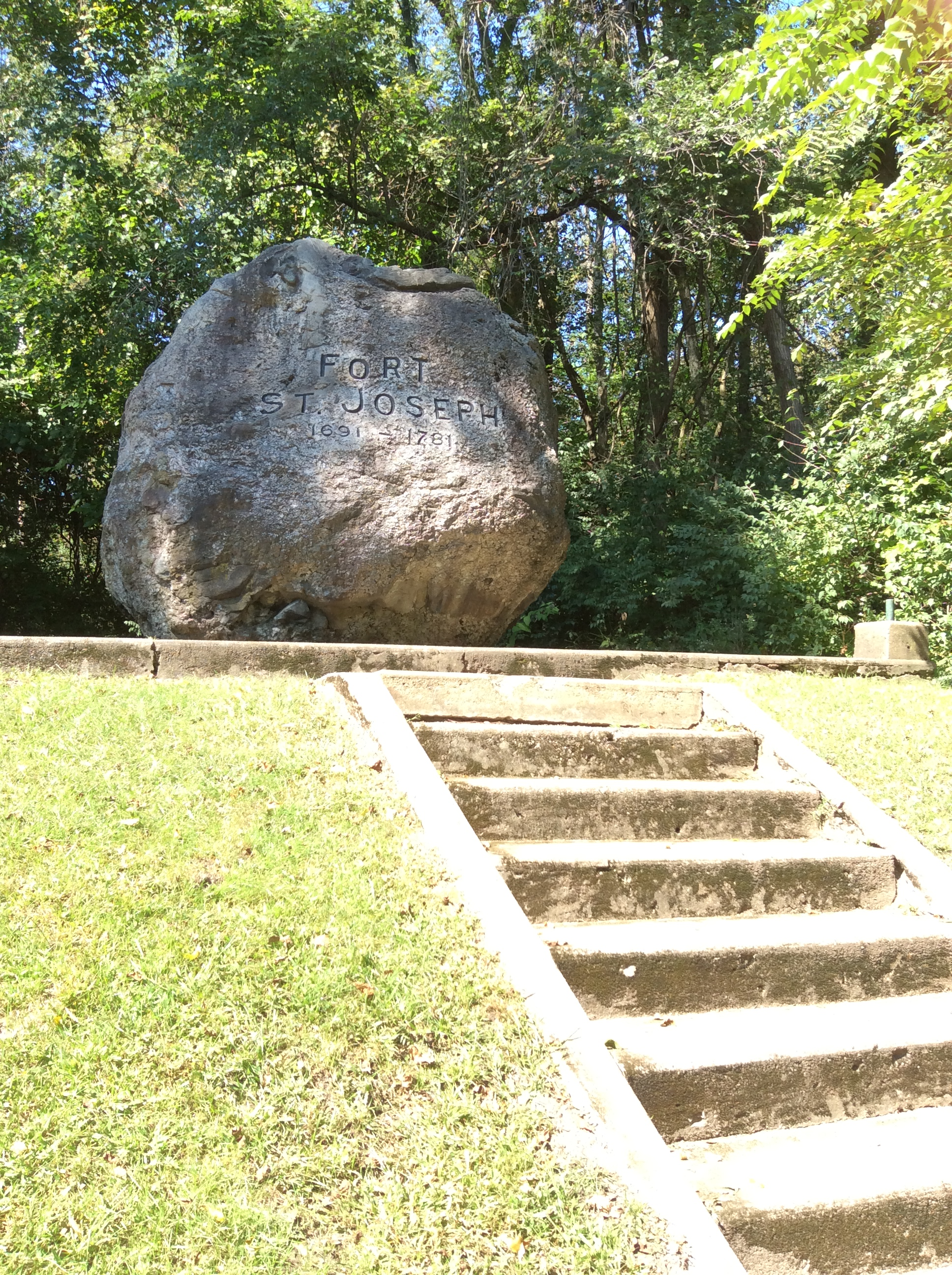
Niles, Michigan

Fort Saint Joseph was a fort established on land granted to the Jesuits by King Louis XIV; it was located on what is now the south side of the present-day town of Niles, Michigan. Père Claude-Jean Allouez established the Mission de Saint-Joseph in the 1680s. Allouez ministered to the local Native Americans, who were primarily Potawatomi and Miami.

The French built the fort in 1691 as a trading post on the lower Saint Joseph River. It was located where one branch of the Old Sauk Trail, a major east–west Native American trail, and the north-south Grand River Trail meet; together the combined trail fords the river. The fort was a significant stronghold of the fur trade at the southern end of Lake Michigan. Prior to the French and Indian War (the North American front of the Seven Years' War in Europe), the post had a French garrison of 10 soldiers, a commandant, blacksmith, Catholic priest, interpreter, and 15 additional households.

Following their victory in the war, the British took over the fort and maintained it for the fur trade. During the American Revolutionary War, they used it to supply their American Indian allies against the rebellious Continentals. The Spanish raided the fort in 1781 and briefly claimed it and the St. Joseph River as their territory. The British maintained the fort until after the United States victory in the Northwest Indian War and the signing of Jay's Treaty in 1795. This settled the northern border. After the British abandoned the fort, it fell into ruin and was overtaken by forest.

The fort site was not rediscovered until 1998. An archeology excavation has been underway since 2002. Among the rare artifacts discovered is an intact Jesuit religious medallion from the 1730s, one of only two found in North America. In December 2010, the team revealed a foundation wall and corner posts of one of the original buildings.

The site is listed on the National Register of Historic Places and is a state-registered site as well.

== French and Indian War ==
During the Battle of Jumonville Glen, considered the first battle of the French and Indian War in North America, Joseph Coulon de Jumonville was killed by Native Americans. He was the son of Nicolas-Antoine Coulon de Villiers and the half-brother of Captain Louis Coulon de Villiers, who was stationed at Fort St. Joseph and vowed revenge for his brother's death. After Great Britain defeated France in the Seven Years' War, the French transferred the fort to British forces, who occupied it in October 1761.

== Pontiac's War ==
On May 25, 1763, during Pontiac's War, the fort, manned by 14 soldiers from the 60th Regiment of Foot, was captured by Potawatomi warriors. They killed most of the garrison outright, and took the commander, Ensign Francis Schlosser, captive along with three other soldiers. The Potawatomi took them to Fort Detroit to be ransomed as prisoners of war, as was common practice for high-ranking military personnel. After the conflict, the British maintained the fort as a trading post, but did not garrison it again until 1779, during the American Revolutionary War.

== American Revolutionary War ==
=== Raid of 1780 ===
During the American Revolutionary War, pro-British traders used Fort St. Joseph to equip the Miami, Potawatomi, and other British-allied Native Americans. In 1780, a Patriot force from Cahokia, Illinois, led by Jean-Baptiste Hamelin and Lieutenant Thomas Brady, raided the fort, plundering its content and capturing several traders. Detroit Militia officer Antoine Dagneaux de Quindre, an officer in British service, led forces after the raiding party; he overtook and defeated them near the Petit Fort.

=== Spanish Expedition of 1781 ===
After the defeat of Hamelin's party, two Milwaukee chiefs, El Heturnò and Naquiguen, traveled to Spanish-held St. Louis; they arrived on December 26, 1780, to report the failed raid. They asked for assistance to raid the fort again. Don Francisco Cruzat, Commandant of St. Louis, dispatched the militia Captain Don Eugenio Pouré with 60 volunteers and Native allies. The force also included Ensign Charles Tayon and the interpreter Louis Chevalier.

The Spanish and Native force travelled via the Illinois River and Kankakee River to modern Dunns Bridge, Indiana. There they turned northeast and marched overland to Fort St. Joseph. Before the Spanish and their allies attacked the fort, they promised the Potawatomi half the bounty if they would remain neutral. Captain Pouré took Fort St. Joseph by surprise on February 12, 1781, by racing across the frozen river and taking the fort before the defenders, who consisted solely of a Canadien trader named Duquier and several of his employees, could go to arms.

He had the Spanish colors raised and claimed Fort St. Joseph and the St. Joseph River for Spain. His troops plundered the fort for one day, distributing the goods among natives before departing. Lt. Dagneau de Quindre arrived the next day, but was unable to persuade his native allies to pursue the raiders. The Spanish returned to St. Louis on March 6 without incident. Pouré delivered the British flag to Cruzat.

Some historians have described the attack as Spanish retaliation for the attack on St. Louis in the previous year. When Cruzat wrote about it to Governor Gálvez, he justified the raid as needing to appear strong to his Native allies, and to forestall British actions in the region. Although Cruzat treated the raid as an act of Indian affairs, the looting and destruction of goods held at Fort St. Joseph also dissuaded a second British attack into Spanish territory.

== Jay's Treaty ==
The British finally abandoned the fort after the United States victory in the Northwest Indian War and the signing of Jay's Treaty in 1795. The fort gradually fell into ruin and was overgrown. Based on its Fort St. Joseph expedition, Spain claimed lands east of the Mississippi River, but this was not recognized by the United States. With the signing of Pinckney's Treaty (1795) with the US, Spain gave up any claim of land east of the Mississippi.

Because of the long dispute over the land, the diplomats Benjamin Franklin and John Jay considered the Spanish campaign at Fort St. Joseph to have been little more than a ploy to claim the Northwest Territory. Franklin warned they want to "shut us up within the Appalachian Mountains."

== Rediscovery to present ==
Pothunters in the late 1800s recovered hundreds of artifacts from the fort site, which are now displayed in the Fort St. Joseph Museum in Niles. They include "trade silver, musket parts, glass beads, buttons, gunflints, knife blades, and door hinges." The specific location of the 15-acre fort site was forgotten, and part of it is likely underwater since a dam downriver raised the water level.

The site was not rediscovered until an archeological survey in 1998. Support the Fort, a local interest group founded in 1992, has helped sponsor a major archeological excavation on site, which began in 2002.

The team from Western Michigan University (WMU) has conducted a public archeology program as the project has developed. A total of 10,000 visitors have attended the annual two-day field school. WMU's related activities have included workshops for graduate students and volunteers, three week-long training programs for middle school and high school teachers, and community outreach, including biweekly lectures at the library.

The seasonal excavations have uncovered rare artifacts, such as a 1730s Jesuit religious medallion, one of only two found in North America. In December 2010 the team made a critical find of a foundation wall and two wooden posts of one of the buildings, helping establish its scale.

Support the Fort has arranged related annual living history exhibits and re-enactments, featuring elements of Potowatomi, French, British and American life at the fort and in the region. In the future, they intend to construct a replica of the fort. It will include space to interpret the artifacts found through controlled excavation. This was the only fort in Michigan to have been under the flags of four nations: France, Great Britain, Spain, and the United States. It was always a multicultural site, a meeting and trading place for the ethnic Europeans with the Potowatomi, Ottawa and Ojibwe nations. It was sometimes the scene for formal marriages among the ethnicities.

== Notable people ==
- Marie Josephte L'Archevêque and Marie Joseph La Marche (Mme. Le Comte), both born at St. Joseph, who inspired what Governor John Reynolds said was the "truthful" telling of Madam La Compt in Pioneer History of Illinois. Marie Magdeleine Réaume, Mme. Le Comte's grandmother, and Louis-Therese Chevalier were Indian diplomats at St. Joseph.

== Sources ==
- Myers, Robert C. "Historic Sites: Fort St. Joseph". Northwest Territory Alliance. Archived from the original on December 18, 2010.
- Nassaney, Michael (November 2009). "Fort St. Joseph. Archaeology and Public Outreach". Past Horizons: 27–30.
- Nassaney, Dr. Michael S., Dr. Jose Antonio Brandao, Dr. William M. Cremins, and Brock A. Giordano, et al., "Archeological Evidence of Economic Activities at an Eighteenth-Century Frontier Outpost in the Western Great Lakes", Historical Archeology, 2007. 41(4):3-19, reproduced in part at Support The Fort Website
- Paré, George. "The St. Joseph Mission". Bloomington, Indiana: Glenn A. Black Laboratory of Archaeology, Indiana University. Archived from the original on December 16, 2007.
- Skaggs, David Curtis, ed. (1977). The Old Northwest in the American Revolution. Madison, Wisconsin: The State Historical Society of Wisconsin. ISBN 0-87020-164-6.
