= Battle of St. Louis =

1780 battle of the American Revolutionary War

- Part of the American Revolutionary War
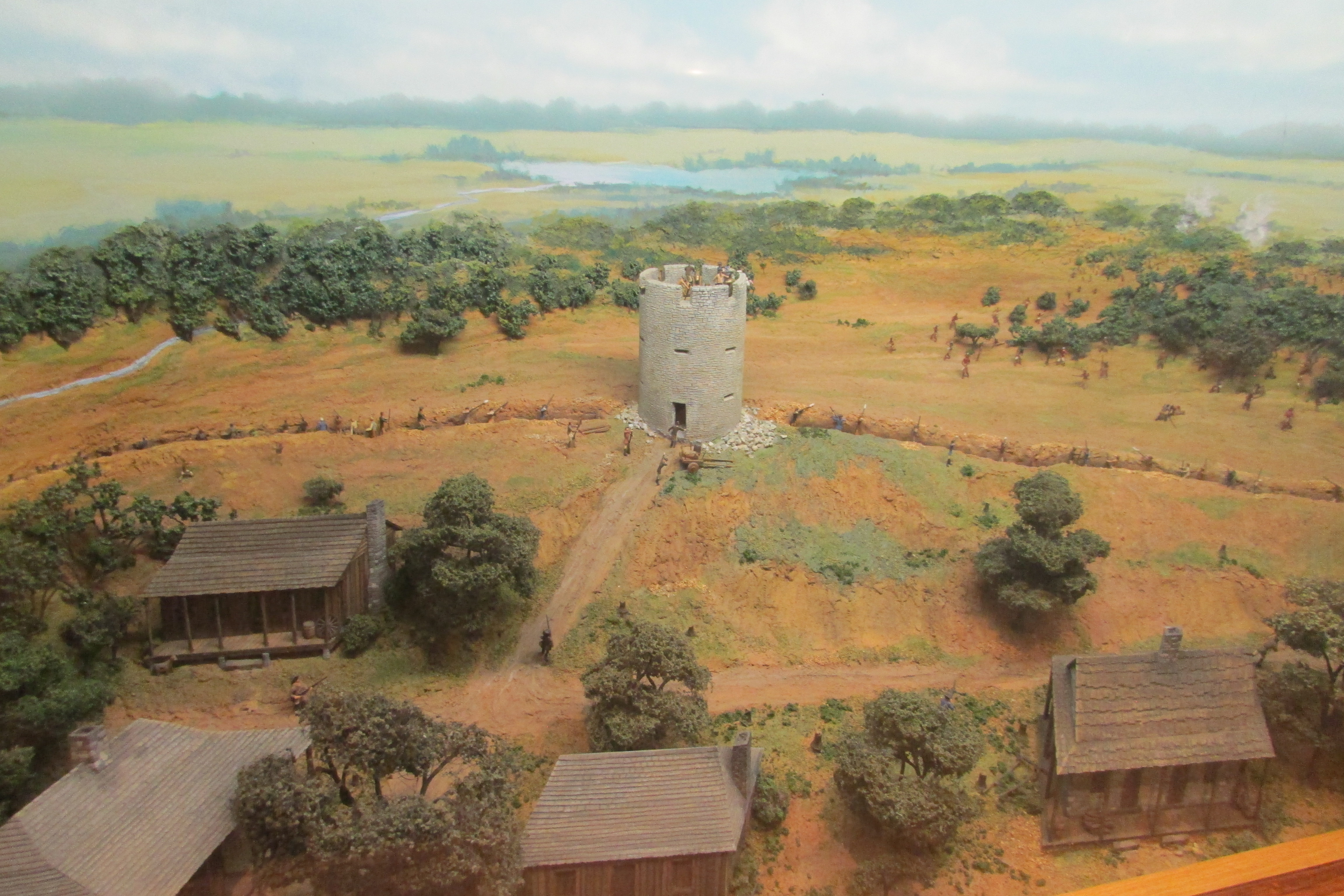
- Diorama of the Battle of St. Louis in the Gateway Arch Museum, Old County Courthouse, St. Louis, Missouri
Date	May 26, 1780
Location	St. Louis and Cahokia 38°37′29.2″N 90°11′25.1″W
Result	American and Spanish victory

Belligerents
Spain; United States	Great Britain; Ho-Chunk; Kickapoo; Odawa; Ojibwe; Mascouten; Menominee; Potawatomi; Sioux; Sac and Fox

Commanders and leaders
(Spanish Empire) Fernando de Leyba: François Vallé; (United States) John Montgomery	(Kingdom of Great Britain) Emanuel Hesse; Matchekewis; Wapasha I

Strength
30 regulars 168 militia	24 irregulars 750–1,500 Indian warriors

Casualties and losses
21–100 killed	4 killed 4 wounded
- Location within North America

The Battle of St. Louis, also known as the Attack on St. Louis and the Battle of Fort San Carlos, was fought on May 26, 1780, between British-allied Indians and defenders of the Franco-Spanish village of St. Louis, Louisiana (present-day U.S. state of Missouri) during the American Revolutionary War. The garrison, a motley assortment of regulars and militiamen led by Upper Louisiana's lieutenant governor, Captain Fernando de Leyba, suffered a small number of casualties.

De Leyba fortified St. Louis as best as he could and successfully withstood the attack. On the opposite bank of the Mississippi River, a simultaneous attack on the nearby American village of Cahokia was also repulsed. The retreating British-allied Indians destroyed crops and took captive inhabitants outside the protected area. The British failed to defend their side of the river, effectively ending any attempts to gain control of the Mississippi River during the Revolutionary War.

== Background ==
After Spain entered the American Revolutionary War in 1779, British military planners in London set out to secure the corridor of the Mississippi River against both Spanish and Patriot military movements. Their plans included expeditions from West Florida to take New Orleans and other Spanish targets, including several expeditions to gain control of targets in the Upper Louisiana, such as the small town of St. Louis. The expedition from West Florida never got off the ground because Bernardo de Gálvez, the Governor of Spanish Louisiana, moved rapidly to gain control of Britain's military outposts on the Lower Mississippi and threatened British control over West Florida's principal outposts of Mobile and Pensacola.

== Prelude to battle ==
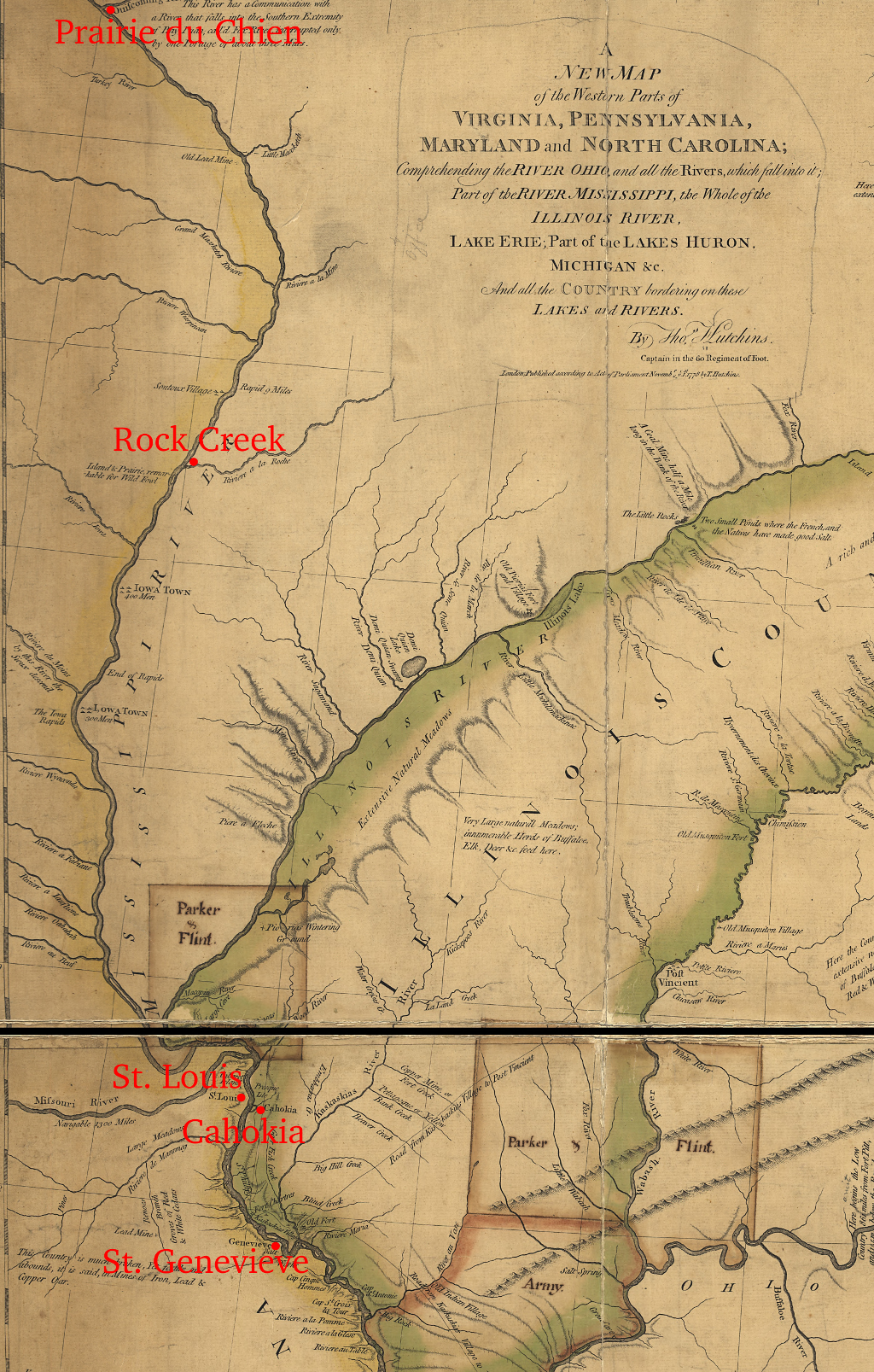
Detail of a 1778 map annotated to show points of interest in the battle.

Patrick Sinclair, the military governor at Fort Michilimackinac, organized the British expeditions from the north in the present-day Michigan. Beginning in February 1780, he directed Loyalist fur traders to circulate through their territories and recruit interested tribes for an expedition against St. Louis. Sinclair offered the fur traders the opportunity to control the fur trade in the upper parts of Spanish Louisiana as an incentive to participate. Most of the force gathered at Prairie du Chien, where Emanuel Hesse, a former militia captain turned fur trader, took command. The force numbered about two dozen fur traders and an estimated 750 to 1,000 Indians when it left Prairie du Chien on May 2.

Two hundred Sioux warriors led by Wapasha I made up the largest contingency of the force, with additional sizable companies from the Ojibwe, Menominee, Ho-Chunk, and smaller numbers from other nations. Ojibwe chief Matchekewis was given overall command of the native forces. When the force reached Rock Island, they were joined by about 250 men from the Sauk and Meskwaki nations. These warriors were somewhat reluctant to attack St. Louis, but Hesse gave them large gifts to secure their participation in the venture. The diversity within the expedition led to some animosity among the tribes. The Ojibwe and Sioux, in particular, had a history of conflict with each other. However, Wapasha and Matchekewis promoted unity during the expedition.

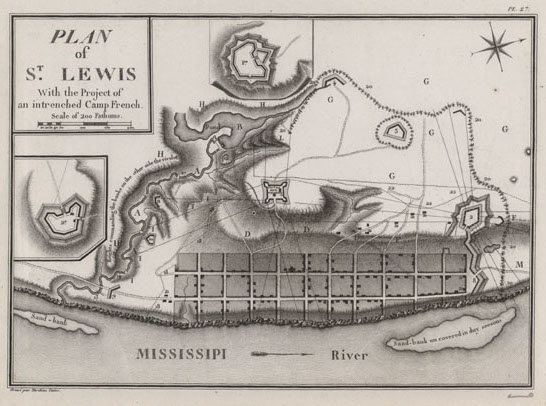
Collot's plan of St. Louis, c. 1790.

The village of St. Louis was primarily a trading hub on the Mississippi River that was governed by Lieutenant Governor Fernando de Leyba, a captain in the Spanish Army, but it was also the administrative capital of Upper Spanish Louisiana. Leyba was warned by a fur trader in late March 1780 that the British were planning an attack on St. Louis and the nearby American post at Cahokia. He began developing plans for the village's defense. He had an inexperienced militia force of 168 dispersed around the surrounding countryside and only 29-man force from the Louisiana Fixed Infantry Regiment.

Leyba developed a grand plan of defense that included the construction of four stone towers. Without funds or the time to get them from New Orleans, Leyba asked the villagers to contribute funds and labor to the construction of these fortifications and paid for some of the work from his private funds. By mid-May, a single round tower had been built that was about 30 feet (9.1 m) in diameter and 30 to 40 feet tall. The tower, dubbed Fort San Carlos, provided a commanding view of the surrounding countryside. As there did not appear to be sufficient time to build more towers, trenches were dug between the tower and the river to the north and south of the village. Three four-pound and two six-pound cannons from Fort Don Carlos were mounted in the tower, and other cannons were emplaced at each end of the line of trenches.

Diorama of the Battle of St. Louis at the Missouri State Museum in 2007.

Fort Don Carlos had been constructed earlier in 1767 on the south bank of the Missouri River, near its mouth, just 15 miles north of the village of St. Louis. With a force of only 197 men, 168 of whom were inexperienced militia, it was highly probable that the opposing British and Indian combined force of 1,000 would overwhelm the Fort San Carlos. However, Leyba appealed to François Vallé, a 64-year-old French inhabitant, former captain of the French militia, who was located 60 miles to the South of the fort at the site of the French Colonial Sainte Genevieve. Valle sent his two sons and 60 well-trained and equipped French militiamen and thus tipped the scale in favor of the defenders. By Royal Decree on April 1, 1782, King Carlos III of Spain conferred upon Francois Vallé the rank of lieutenant in the regular Spanish army, thus making him a Spanish don.

Valle also aided greatly in the Battle of Fort San Carlos because he gave the defenders of both forts a major tactical advantage by supplying them with genuine lead (instead of pebbles or stones) from his mines for musket balls and cannonballs. As a result of his contributions, Francois Valle was called the "Defender of St. Louis". On May 15, Leyba was visited by John Montgomery, the American commander at Cahokia, who proposed a joint Spanish and American force to counter Hesse's expedition, an idea that never reached fruition. On May 23, Leyba's scouts reported that Hesse's force had landed their canoes only 14 miles (23 km) away and were coming overland.

== Battle ==
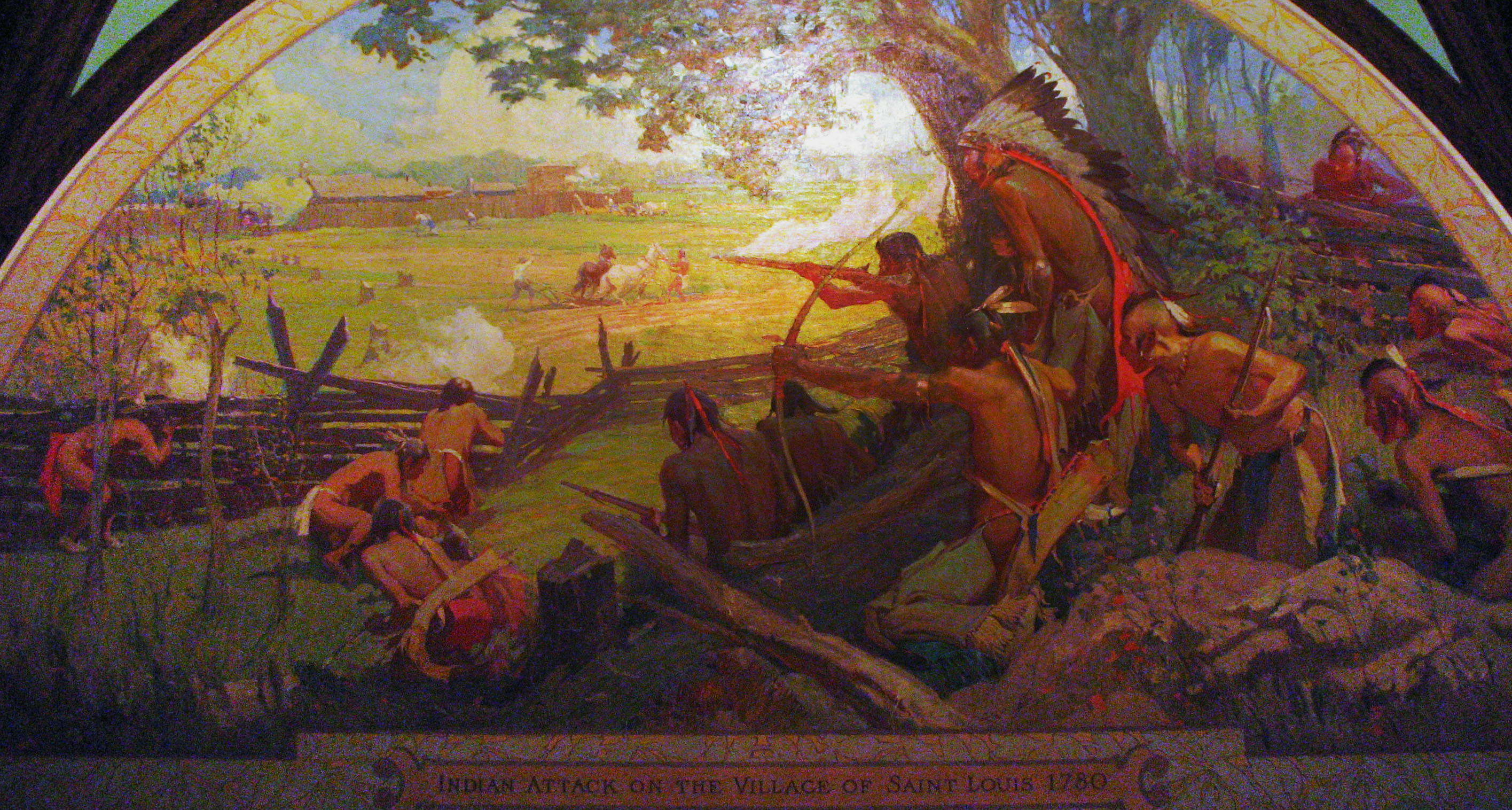
Indian Attack on the Village of Saint Louis 1780 by Oscar E. Berninghaus, 1925, Missouri State Capitol.

On May 25, Hesse sent out scouting parties to determine the situation at St. Louis. These parties were unable to get close to the village due to the presence of workers (including women and children) in the fields outside the village. The next day, Hesse sent Jean-Marie Ducharme and 300 Indians across the river to attack Cahokia, while the remainder arrived around 1:00 pm near St. Louis. A warning shot was fired from the tower when they came into view. The Sioux and Winnebagoes led the way, followed by the Sauk, Meskwaki and fur traders, including Hesse, in the rear. Leyba directed the defense from the tower and opened fire on the approaching enemy from the trenches and tower when they came in range. On the first volley, most of the Sauk and Meskwaki fell back, apparently unwilling to fight, leaving many of the other participants suspicious of their motives in joining the expedition and complaining of their "treachery".

Wapasha and the Sioux persisted for several hours in attempts to draw the Spanish defenders out. They went as far as brutally killing some captives they had taken in the fields. Although this angered some of the townspeople, Leyba refused to grant permission to the militia to make a sortie. The attackers eventually withdrew and headed north, destroying crops, livestock, and buildings as they went. On the other side of the river, Ducharme's attack on Cahokia was easily repulsed. George Rogers Clark made a timely arrival to lead Cahokia's defense. Clark's reputation as a frontier fighter made the Indian force reluctant to pursue the attack.

== Aftermath ==
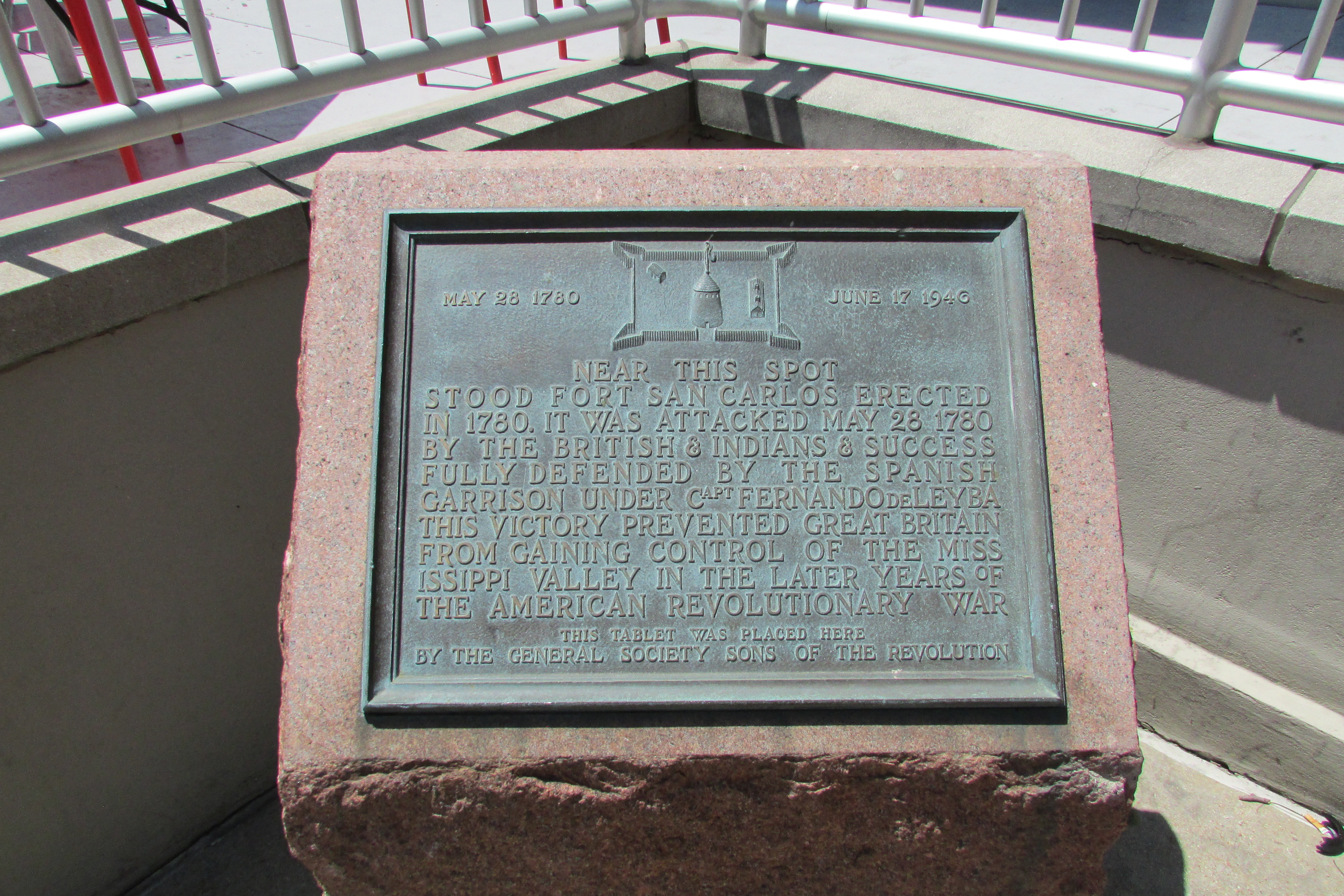
Sons of the Revolution tablet in Downtown St. Louis marking the nearby location of Fort San Carlos.

The village of 700 inhabitants lost between 50 and 100 people who were either killed, wounded or captured. Virtually all casualties were civilians. A year later, the Spaniards from St. Louis raided Fort St. Joseph and brought the captured British flag back to St. Louis. Leyba died the following month. He was the subject of local criticism because he never formally recognized the efforts made by the citizenry in the town's defense. King Charles III, unaware that he had died, promoted him to the rank of lieutenant colonel because of his valor in action.

The site where Fort San Carlos stood is at the corner of Fourth and Walnut Street in St. Louis. A local organization, the Commemoration Committee for the Battle of Fort San Carlos, annually commemorates the event by reading out the names of the 21 people who lost their lives during the battle. The battle is also remembered in a mural at the Missouri State Capitol (pictured). The Missouri State Museum also has a diorama (pictured) of the fort depicting the battle in its collection, but it is not currently on exhibit in the museum.
