= Henry A. Chapin House =

Historic house in Michigan, United States

- U.S. National Register of Historic Places
- Michigan State Historic Site
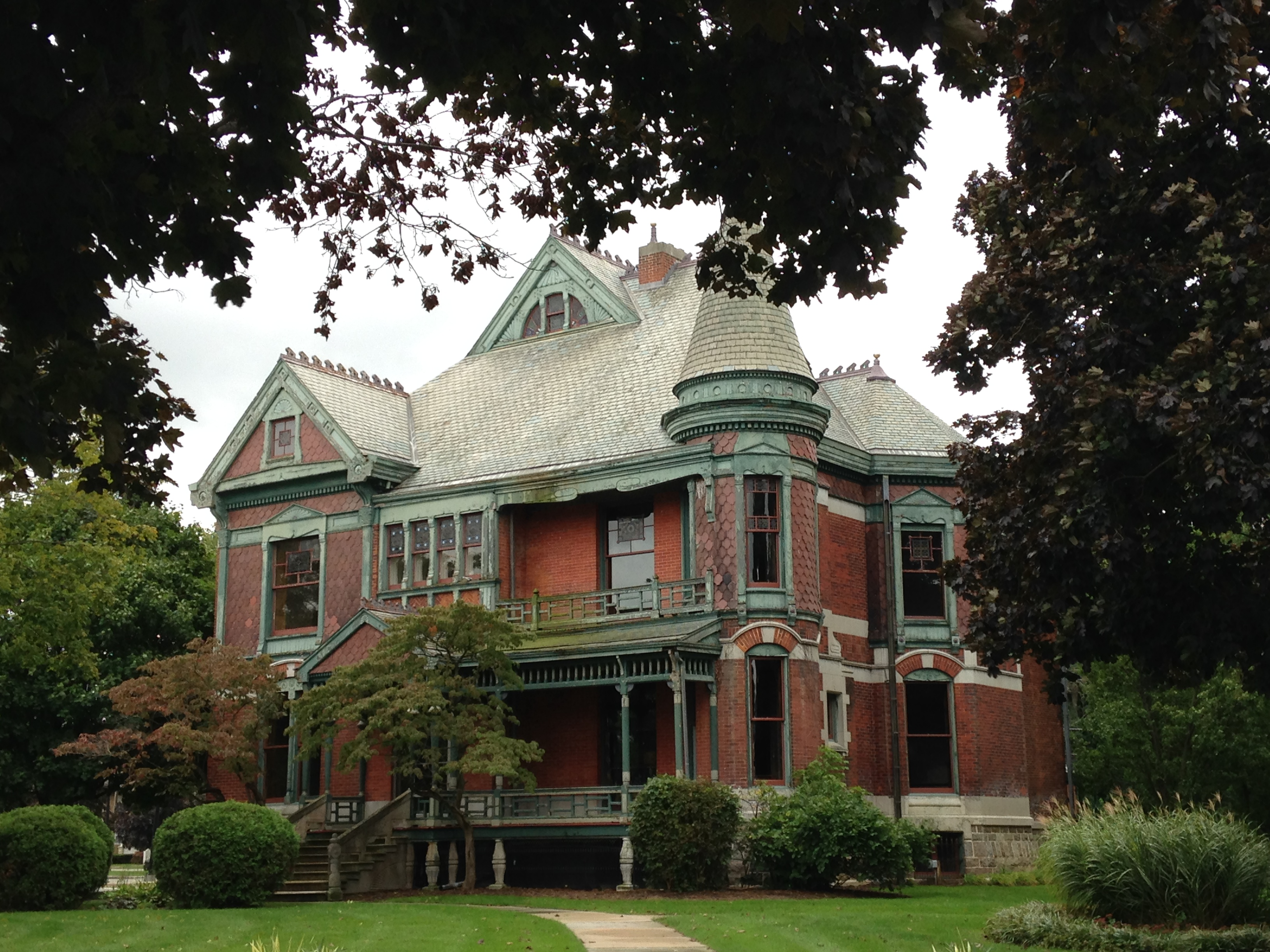

- Location within Michigan Location within the United States
- Interactive map
- Location: 508 E. Main St., Niles, Michigan; United States
- Coordinates: 41°49′45″N 86°15′12″W
- Built: 1882
- Architect: Wheelock & Clay
- Architectural style: Queen Anne
- NRHP reference No.: 81000304

Significant dates
- Added to NRHP: July 30, 1981
- Designated MSHS: June 15, 1992

The Henry A. Chapin House, also known as Chapin Mansion, is a historic house in Niles, Michigan. It was listed as a Michigan State Historic Site in 1976, and listed on the National Register of Historic Places in 1981.

== History ==
Henry A. Chapin was born in Leyden, Massachusetts in 1813 and moved with his parents to Ohio in 1814. In 1834, Chapin moved to Edwardsburg, Michigan, a few miles east of Niles, and started a general store. Ten years later, he entered into a partnership with S. S. Griffin and opened a wool business and general store in Niles. The business failed in 1861, but by 1864 Chapin was out of debt and again prosperous. In 1865 he purchased a tract of land in the Upper Peninsula near Iron Mountain. In 1878 an immense lode of iron ore was discovered on Chapin's property, and the Chapin Mine was quickly organized. Chapin did not own or operate the mine, but he did receive royalties of amounting to $100,000 to $300,000 annually throughout the rest of his lifetime.

Chapin began construction on this house, designed by the Chicago firm of Wheelock & Clay, in 1882. The house was finished in 1884, and Chapin lived in it until his death in 1898. The house was donated to the city of Niles in 1933, and it served as the Niles City Hall from a point between 1933 and 1937 until December 7, 2012. In May 2013, the administration of the mansion was turned over to the Niles History Center, and the mansion was opened to the public.

== Description ==
The Chapin House is a three-story red brick Queen Anne structure with slate, wood, and terra cotta trimmings. It sits on a Bedford blue stone foundation, and is capped with a hipped roof. The structure has a turreted, round corner tower and a number of projecting and recessed porches and semi-hexagonal bay window units.

On the interior, the first floor originally contained an entrance hall flanked by a parlor and library, a stair hall, a sitting room, dining room, kitchen and pantry. The second floor contained an upper stair hall surrounded by four large bedchambers and quarters for servants in the rear. The third floor contained a ballroom. The interior remains virtually unaltered, despite the use as the Niles City Hall for over 70 years.

== Fort St. Joseph Museum ==
The museum is located in the carriage house of the Chapin Mansion and focuses on the city's history. Exhibits include Fort St. Joseph, built by the French as a trading post in 1691, the Underground Railroad in southern Michigan, area railroads and artifacts of the Lakota people.
