= François Vallé =

French slave owner from Louisiana

Francois Valle
- Born: 1716
- Died: 1783 (aged 64–65)
- Allegiance: France
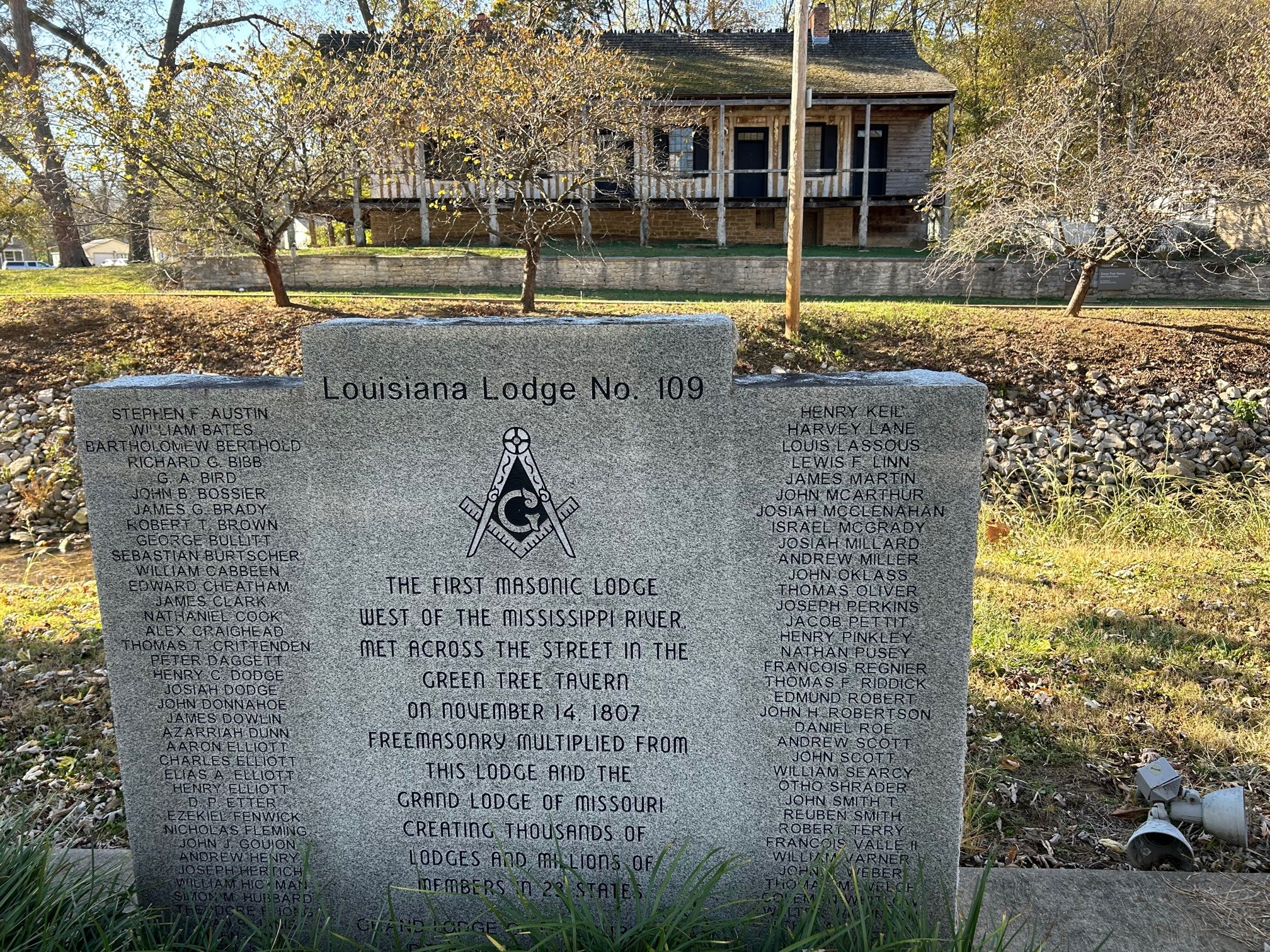
- Conflicts: American Revolutionary War Battle of St. Louis Francois Valle inscribed in stone

François Vallé (c. 1716 – 1783) son of Charles Vallée and Geneviève Marcou, was a French Canadian who migrated to Upper Louisiana From Beauport, Quebec City sometime in the early 1740s. Beginning as a laborer of no means, he engaged in agriculture, lead mining, and trade with the natives. He was also the largest enslaver in Ste. Genevieve and the Spanish province of Upper Louisiana. Upon his death, he was the wealthiest man in Upper Louisiana.

Vallé also aided greatly in the Battle of St. Louis during the American Revolutionary War, because he gave the defenders of both forts a major tactical advantage by supplying them with genuine lead (instead of pebbles or stones) from his mines for musket balls and cannon balls. He was successively officer of the local French militia then Spanish lieutenant of the militia of Upper Louisiana.

His descendants are now recognized among the Sons and Daughters of the American Revolution for his contributions to the defense of the territory.

François Vallé was also a Freemason, and the early Masonic activity centered around his influence would later become associated with Lodge No. 109 in Louisiana.
