= Wapasha I =

Wapasha Wáȟpe Šá
- Mdewakanton Dakota chief
- Born: c. 1718; Minnesota
- Died: 1806

Wapasha (Dakota: Wáȟpe Šá; c. 1718–1806) was the name of a Mdewakanton Dakota chief.

Wapasha was born in present-day Minnesota in about 1718. During his youth he befriended the agents of King Louis XV of France and encouraged trade between the French and Dakota nations. Wapasha and his followers were valuable allies of the French, aiding them in their conflicts with the British until the end of the French and Indian War. After the British defeated the French in 1763, they were suspicious and fearful of their Sioux allies. As a result, there were no English trappers and traders among the Sioux. They had become more accustomed to hunting with rifles than bows and arrows. Fur trading with French trappers brought provisions and ammunition and the Dakota found it difficult to survive without this commerce.

Several incidents that took place during the French and Indian War made English trappers apprehensive about returning to the Mississippi River valley. One such incident took place in 1761. A Dakota named Ixkatapay had shot an English trader called Pagonta by the Sioux. The two had quarreled earlier, and Pagonta was reportedly killed while sitting in his cabin smoking. Ixkatapay was turned over to the British for the killing. Wapasha led the party, composed of 100 men, to the English headquarters in Quebec. By the time Wapasha had reached Green Bay, Wisconsin, there were only six of the original 100 left, Wapasha and five warriors. The others had drifted off in small groups. One of these deserting bands had taken Ixkatapay with them and returned to their homelands. Wapasha and the remaining five continued to Quebec and offered themselves as surrogates for Ixkatapay in the English court. Because Wapasha said he would have himself executed for Ixkatapay, the British decided to release both Wapasha and the other warriors out of admiration.

When he returned home, Wapasha became a war chief and his warriors fought in the American Revolutionary War against the Ojibwe, along with the Sauk and Fox, allied to British and loyalist forces. However, he also reluctantly fought with British forces against the Spanish at an unsuccessful raid on St. Louis. First and foremost concerned for his people's freedom and survival, Wapasha's part in the war depended on which side would ensure open trade and protection from encroaching enemies. Wapasha himself was always greeted by the salute of a cannon. When American victory was announced at Prairie Du Chein in 1783, it is said that Wapasha was "content". The Dakota eventually repelled their enemies, but Wapasha narrowly escaped a smallpox epidemic that struck his entire village. Wapasha died of throat cancer at the age of 88, just after the dawn of the 19th century. He was succeeded by his son, Wapasha II.
