= Well Hungarians =

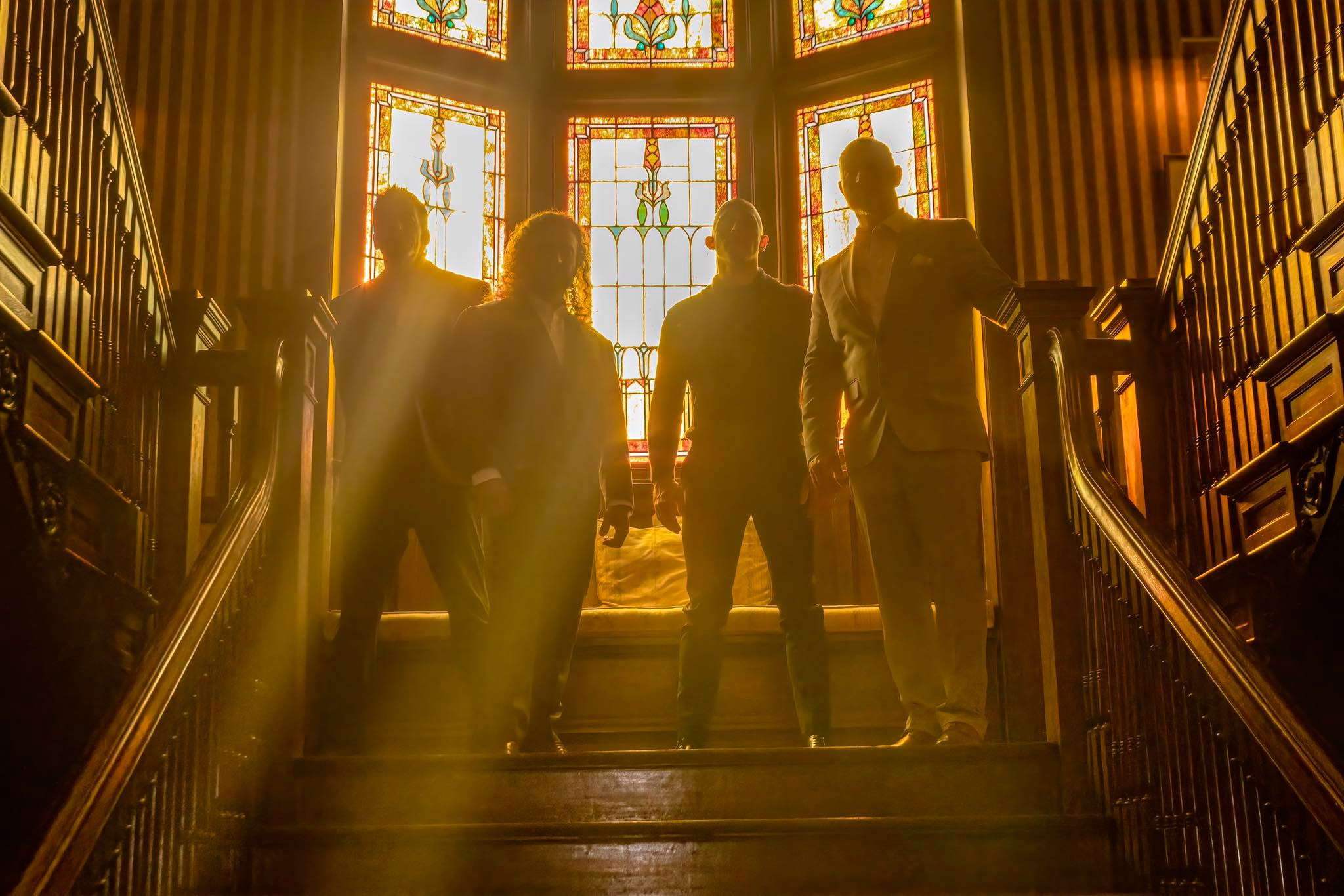

Background information
- Origin: Cahokia, Illinois; St. Louis, Missouri, United States
- Genres: Country, Rock, Americana
- Instruments: Vocals, guitar, electric guitar, acoustic guitar, drums, steel guitar, fiddle, piano
- Years active: 1993–present
- Label: Leopold Enterprises
- Members: Johnny Holzum; Greg Bunton; John Joseph Shanahan; Ethan Morris; Scott Lesinski
- Website: wellhungarians.net

Well Hungarians (formed 1993 in Cahokia, IL near St. Louis, MO) are an American country music and rock music band.

== Members and history ==
The band consists of Johnny Holzum (vocals, bass, songwriter, founder), Greg Bunton (vocals, drums), John Joseph Shanahan (vocals, acoustic and electric rhythm guitar), Ethan Morris (vocals, electric guitar, keyboard), and Scott Lesinski (vocals, fiddle, keyboard). To date, the band has released three albums and have charted four singles. The band was also named New Music Weekly 2006 Country Band of the Year.

Originating from the St. Louis/Southern Illinois area in 1993, Well Hungarians have performed in concert with many music greats. The band has charted four consecutive singles from their CDs, including "Sorry 'bout the Mess" and "Diamonds and Love", which received airplay in the U.S. and ten other countries.

== Discography ==
=== Studio albums ===
Year	Album
1999	Framed
2004	Sorry 'Bout the Mess
2015	Bona Fide

=== Singles ===
Year	Single	Album
2003	"Sorry 'Bout The Mess"	Sorry 'Bout the Mess
2004	"Rock 'n' Roll Singer"	Sorry 'Bout the Mess
2004	"Betty Rides Around"	Sorry 'Bout the Mess
2007	"Diamonds and Love"	Single Only
