= Gros Loup =

Gros Loup, from the St. Joseph River Valley area, was a Miami chief of Kekionga. Gros Loup was one of their great chiefs of the Miami people, who were among the most powerful tribes in the Midwest.

== Life with the Miami ==
Gros Loup was born a Mohican, but as an infant he was taken in by the Miami people.

Loup was the chief of the Kekionga village at Miamitown on the east bank of the St. Joseph, near the confluence with the St. Marys River. Chief Le Petit (Necaquangai) led the people of Pied Froid village on the west bank. In 1777, there were probably 375 to 400 men and a total of 1,200 people in the two villages.

Loup was an expert grower of grain for people, which could be milled in local mills, such as two operated by the Iliniwik or one Jesuit mill, and a different strain for animals. He grew vegetables like kidney beans, corn, and pumpkin. He was prominent among the area's Native Americans.

== American Revolutionary War ==
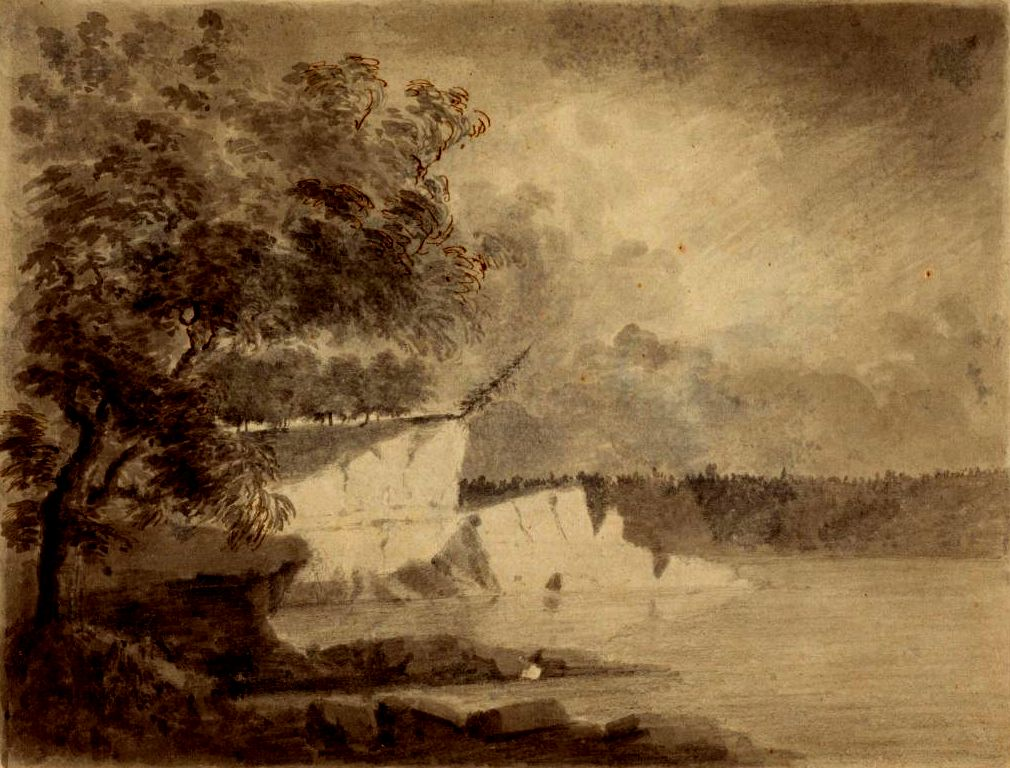
A scene along the Wabash River, sketched in 1778 by Lt Governor Henry Hamilton en route to recapture Vincennes, Indiana

Loup went with British Lieutenant Governor Henry Hamilton during the August 6 to October 27, 1778, voyage along the upper Maumee after In October 1778, the British battled the French and Americans in the Midwest during the American Revolutionary War. After taking command of Fort Vincennes, Governor Edward Abbott raised the English flag there. By October 14, Loup relayed what had happened afterwards. The Patriot soldiers removed the flag and threw stone-wrapped flag in the Wabash River. The patriots unceremoniously asked Native American chiefs if they were going to fight for the Americans or not. Insulted, a Piankeshaw chief, Old Tobacco rebuffed the patriots, as did a young chief Pouteouattamies, who said that if he did not have family responsibilities, he was tempted to put a tomahawk in the rebel's head. Riled, the American soldiers threatened to attack any Native American forts or villages that they might see on their route to Detroit, where they would hog-tie Hamilton. Loup agreed to go to Ouiattonon to gather intelligence on the "attitude" of Native American warriors for Hamilton on October 26.

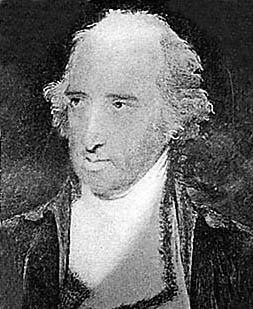
British Lieutenant Governor Henry Hamilton

Louis-Therese Chevalier planned a visit with Gros Loup to meet British Lieutenant Governor Henry Hamilton in Detroit in 1778. As a sign of diplomacy, both parties were to bring liquor and presents to "seal the bonds of friendship". Gros Loup presented an assortment of his harvested dried pumpkins, baskets of young corn, and kidney beans. Hamilton, who brought nothing, was not impressed.
