= Jean-Baptiste Hamelin =

French Canadian soldier

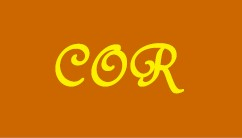
- Congress's Own Regiment
- Born: September 9, 1733; Nemours, France
- Died: September 23, 1804 (aged 71); Montreal, Province of Quebec, British North America
- Military career
- Allegiance: United States
- Branch: Continental Army
- Service years: Continental Army: 1775-1783
- Rank: Soldier
- Unit: 2nd Canadian Regiment
- Conflicts: American Revolutionary War; Battle of Saint-Pierre; Battle of Brandywine; Battle of Germantown; Battle of Saint-Joseph

Jean-Baptiste Hamelin (August 9, 1733 – September 23, 1804) was a French Canadian soldier who fought on the U.S. side of the American Revolutionary War, serving in Moses Hazen's 2nd Canadian Regiment of the Continental Army.

Hamelin participated in the battle of the Congress's Own Regiment until 1779 where he was sent in the west to help George Rogers Clark in his campaigns. He was sent by Augustin de La Balme to attack Fort St. Joseph (modern-day Niles, Michigan). The attack itself was successful, but his party was chased down and some of his men were caught and killed.
