= Cahokia, Illinois =

Village in the United States

Cahokia
- Village
- Location of Cahokia in St. Clair County, Illinois.

- Location of Cahokia Cahokia (the United States)
- Coordinates: 38°34′15″N 90°11′24″W
- Country: United States
- State: Illinois
- County: St. Clair
- Established: 1699

Government
  - Mayor: Curtis McCall Jr.

Area
  - Total: 10.31 sq mi (26.70 km^{2})
  - Land: 9.75 sq mi (25.26 km^{2})
  - Water: 0.56 sq mi (1.44 km^{2})
- Elevation: 407 ft (124 m)

Population (2020)
  - Total: 12,096
  - Density: 1,423.1/sq mi (549.46/km^{2})
- Time zone: UTC-6 (CST)
  - Summer (DST): UTC-5 (CDT)
- Postal code: 62206
- Area code: 618
- FIPS code: 17-10370
- GNIS feature ID: 426287
- Wikimedia Commons: Cahokia, Illinois
- Website: www.cahokiaillinois.org

Cahokia is a village now part of Cahokia Heights, Illinois, in St. Clair County, United States. It was founded as a colonial French mission in 1689. It is in Metro East, east of the Mississippi River in the Greater St. Louis metropolitan area. As of the 2020 census, Cahokia had a population of 12,096. On May 6, 2021, the village was incorporated into the new city of Cahokia Heights.

The name refers to one of the clans of the historic Illiniwek confederacy, who met early French explorers to the region. Early European settlers named the nearby (and long-abandoned) Cahokia Mounds in present-day Madison County after the Illini clan. The UNESCO World Heritage Site and State Historic Park were developed by the Mississippian culture, active here from 900 to 1500 AD. A connection to the clan is possible but unknown. The area was part of an extensive urban complex, the largest of the far-flung Mississippian culture territory through the Mississippi and Ohio River Valleys.

French Canadian colonists founded Cahokia village in 1696 as a Catholic mission. The historic Church of the Holy Family is the oldest continuously active Catholic parish in the United States, as well as the oldest church west of the Allegheny Mountains. Other significant colonial and Federal-period buildings listed on the National Register of Historic Places include the Cahokia Courthouse (circa 1740, in the French Colonial style); and the Jarrot Mansion (circa 1810).

== History ==
=== Cahokia Mounds ===
Archeologists ascribe the earthwork mounds Cahokia complex to the Mississippian culture, an earlier indigenous people, who are not believed to have been ancestral to the Illini. The city site reached its peak in the 13th century and was abandoned centuries before European contact. The Cahokia Native Americans of the Illinois did not coalesce as a tribe and lived in the Illinois area until nearly the time of French contact 300 years ago.

=== Pinet's Mission ===
Father Pinet founded a mission in late 1696 to convert the Cahokian and Tamaroa Native Americans to Christianity. Pinet and the Seminary of Foreign Missions of Quebec built a log church and dedicated it to the Holy Family.

=== 18th-century settlement ===
Over the next 100 years, Cahokia became one of the largest French colonial towns in the Illinois Country. It was centrally located for trading Indian goods and furs, and grew to about 3,000 inhabitants. Its thriving business district reflected a frontier society numerically dominated by men, as it had 24 brothels. The nearby town of Kaskaskia on the Mississippi River (founded 1703) became the region's leading shipping port, and Fort de Chartres (founded 1718) was developed by the French as a military and governmental command center. The 50-mile (80 km) area of land between the two villages was cultivated by farming settlers, known as habitants, whose main crop was wheat. As settlement expanded, the relationship between the settlers and the Indians continued to be peaceful. Settlers were mostly Canadien migrants whose families had been in North America for a while.

=== French and Indian War ===
Cahokia declined after the French lost the French and Indian War in North America to the British in 1763, as part of the broader Seven Years' War in Europe. Only Fort Kaskaskia (built 1733) was destroyed in the conflict, and Cahokia remained regionally important for another four decades. In the treaty ending the war, France ceded large parts of what it called the Illinois Country east of the Mississippi River to the British, including the area of Canada. Many French-speaking residents of Cahokia and elsewhere in what had been Upper Louisiana moved west of the river to territory still controlled by the French rather than live under British rule. Many moved to Lower Louisiana, where they founded new Canadien villages on the west side of the Mississippi River, such as Ste. Genevieve, Missouri, and St. Louis.

The Odawa leader Pontiac was assassinated by other Indians in or near Cahokia on April 20, 1769.

=== American Revolutionary War ===
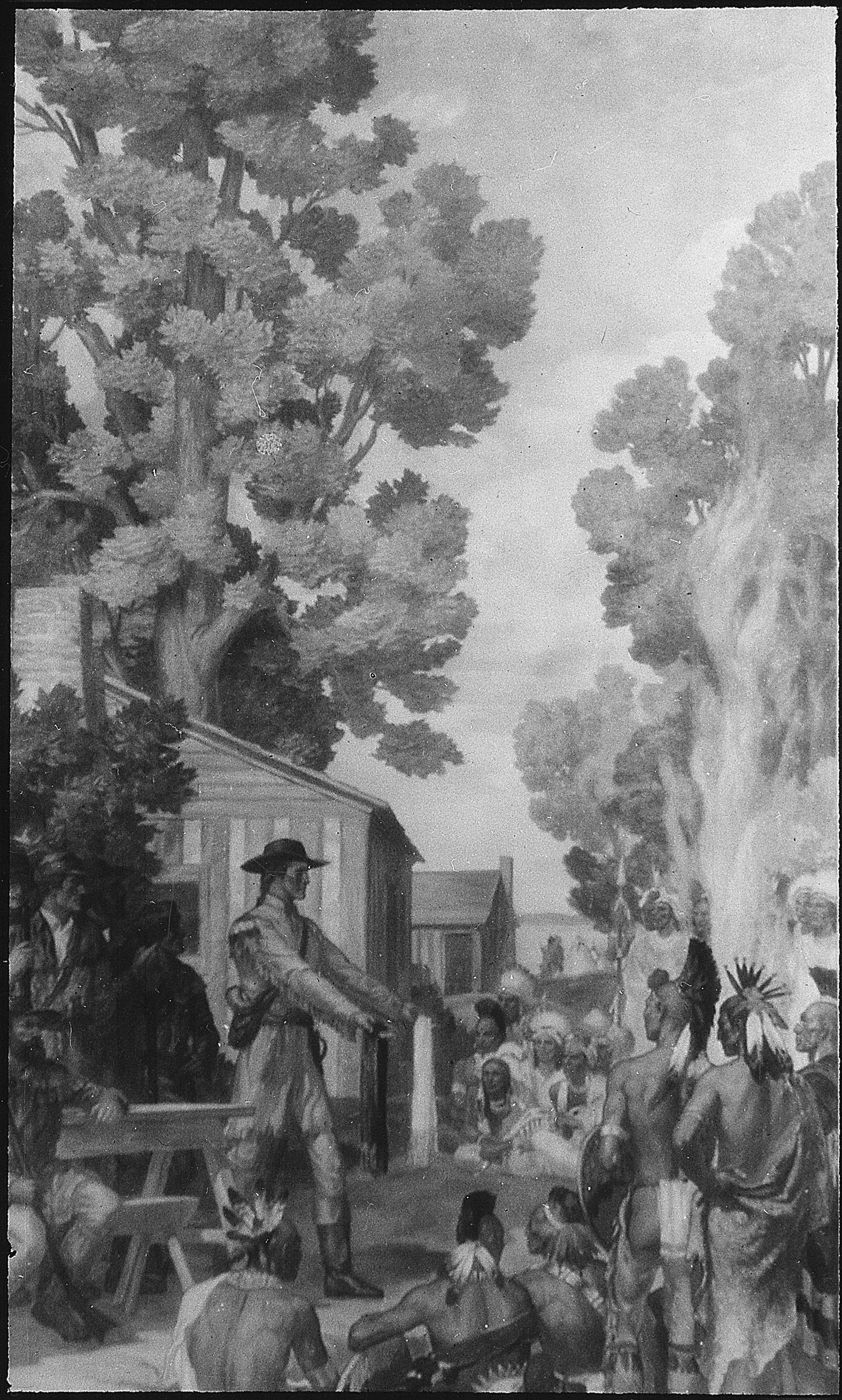
Col. George Rogers Clark's conference with the Indians at Cahokia, unknown artist, from the National Archives and Records Administration

In 1778, during the American Revolutionary War, Virginian George Rogers Clark captured Kaskaskia and set up a court in Cahokia, making Cahokia an independent city-state, though it was part of the British Province of Quebec. Cahokia (and Kaskaskia and the rest of Illinois County) officially became part of the United States by the Treaty of Paris (1783), by which the US took over former British territory west of the Appalachian Mountains. The US soon designated this area the Northwest Territory (and after Ohio and Indiana became states, the Illinois Territory). Meanwhile, 105 Cahokia "heads of household" pledged loyalty to the Continental Congress of the United States.

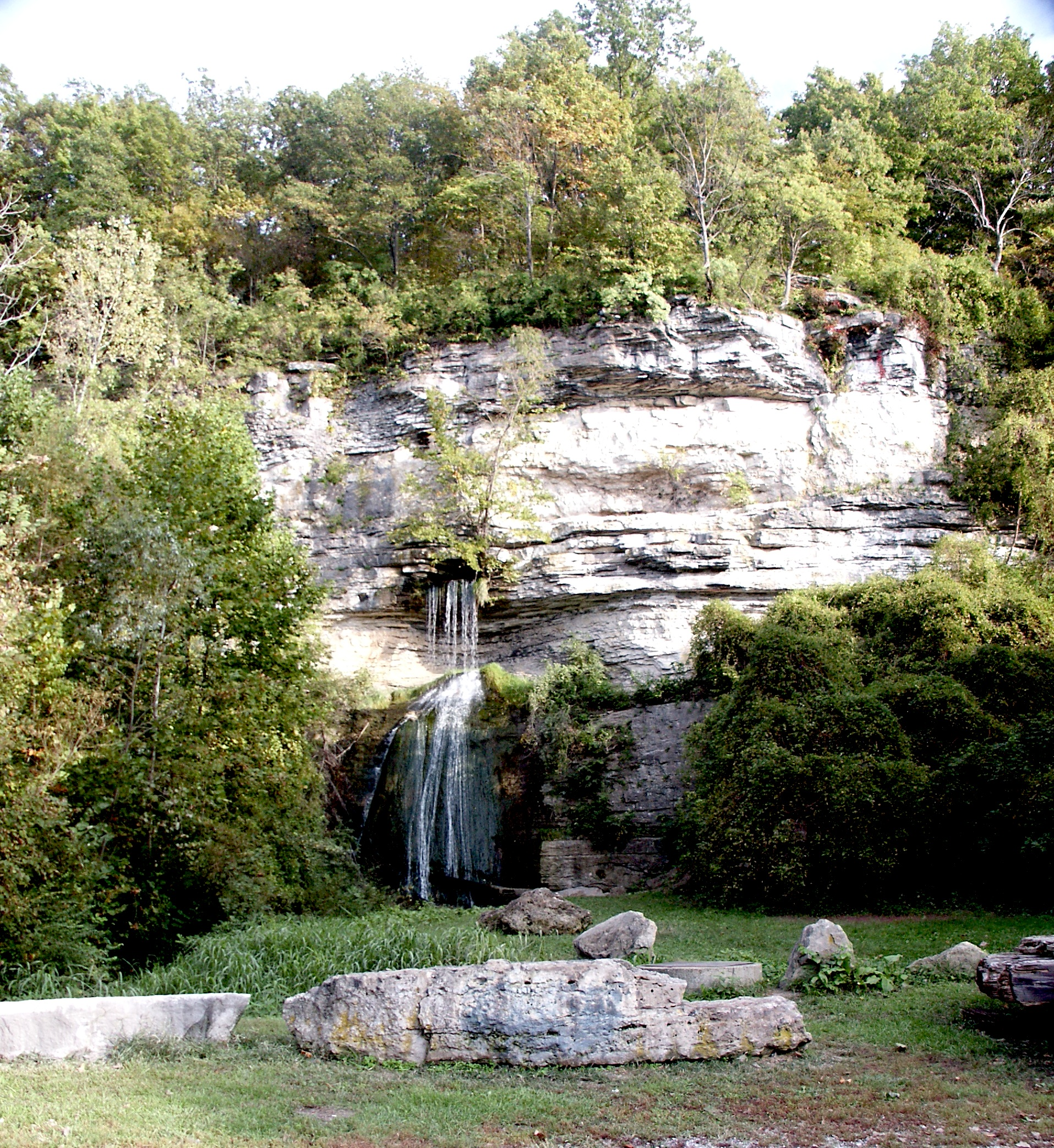
Falling Springs, a waterfall in the Cahokia area

=== Northwest Ordinance ===
After Congress passed the Northwest Ordinance in 1787 and established a governmental system for the territory, the Cahokia Courthouse was adapted for use as a US territorial courthouse. Cahokia remained a major political center for the next 24 years. Flood-prone Kaskaskia became the governmental seat of the Illinois Territory (1809–1818), until the territorial seat was moved to Vandalia, Illinois, and in 1809 became the county seat of Randolph County. Cahokia became the seat of St. Clair County, named by and after Arthur St. Clair, the first territorial governor. When St. Clair County was enlarged in 1801 and 1809, Governor William Henry Harrison (and later territorial secretary and acting governor Nathaniel Pope) named the Cahokia Courthouse as the legal and governmental center of a sizeable area extending to the Canada–U.S. border. By 1814, other counties and territories had been organized, and St. Clair County became its current size. The county seat was moved to the more central Belleville, Illinois (incorporated 1819 and as a city in 1850), when a local developer offered to donate land for a new county courthouse and seat.

=== Annexed territory ===
In the late 1950s, Cahokia annexed some population and territory, increasing its population by more than 15,000 in 1960.

== Geography ==
Cahokia was located at 38°33′43″N 90°10′22″W.

According to the 2010 census, Cahokia had an area of 9.9 square miles (25.64 km^{2}), of which 0.5 sq mi (1.29 km^{2}) (or 5.05%) is covered by water.

=== Climate ===
Climate data for Cahokia, Illinois, 1991–2020 normals, extremes 1997–present
Month	Jan	Feb	Mar	Apr	May	Jun	Jul	Aug	Sep	Oct	Nov	Dec	Year
Record high °F (°C)	72 (22)	81 (27)	86 (30)	92 (33)	95 (35)	107 (42)	107 (42)	105 (41)	102 (39)	94 (34)	85 (29)	75 (24)	107 (42)
Mean maximum °F (°C)	63.5 (17.5)	69.9 (21.1)	79.4 (26.3)	86.4 (30.2)	90.4 (32.4)	95.9 (35.5)	97.8 (36.6)	97.5 (36.4)	93.9 (34.4)	87.4 (30.8)	75.5 (24.2)	66.6 (19.2)	99.7 (37.6)
Mean daily maximum °F (°C)	40.7 (4.8)	46.0 (7.8)	56.1 (13.4)	67.5 (19.7)	76.1 (24.5)	84.8 (29.3)	88.5 (31.4)	87.3 (30.7)	80.3 (26.8)	69.5 (20.8)	56.2 (13.4)	45.1 (7.3)	66.5 (19.2)
Daily mean °F (°C)	31.4 (−0.3)	35.8 (2.1)	45.4 (7.4)	56.5 (13.6)	66.0 (18.9)	74.8 (23.8)	78.7 (25.9)	77.0 (25.0)	69.5 (20.8)	57.7 (14.3)	45.7 (7.6)	35.8 (2.1)	56.2 (13.4)
Mean daily minimum °F (°C)	22.0 (−5.6)	25.6 (−3.6)	34.7 (1.5)	45.4 (7.4)	56.0 (13.3)	64.9 (18.3)	68.9 (20.5)	66.7 (19.3)	58.6 (14.8)	46.0 (7.8)	35.3 (1.8)	26.6 (−3.0)	45.9 (7.7)
Mean minimum °F (°C)	2.9 (−16.2)	8.1 (−13.3)	17.0 (−8.3)	30.3 (−0.9)	39.4 (4.1)	52.0 (11.1)	57.9 (14.4)	53.9 (12.2)	44.3 (6.8)	28.7 (−1.8)	20.4 (−6.4)	10.5 (−11.9)	0.5 (−17.5)
Record low °F (°C)	−14 (−26)	−7 (−22)	4 (−16)	24 (−4)	33 (1)	45 (7)	50 (10)	47 (8)	35 (2)	22 (−6)	11 (−12)	−5 (−21)	−14 (−26)
Average precipitation inches (mm)	2.67 (68)	2.26 (57)	3.55 (90)	4.63 (118)	4.80 (122)	4.30 (109)	5.02 (128)	3.09 (78)	3.35 (85)	3.04 (77)	3.33 (85)	2.75 (70)	42.79 (1,087)
Average snowfall inches (cm)	4.9 (12)	3.7 (9.4)	1.2 (3.0)	0.3 (0.76)	0.0 (0.0)	0.0 (0.0)	0.0 (0.0)	0.0 (0.0)	0.0 (0.0)	0.0 (0.0)	0.8 (2.0)	2.9 (7.4)	13.8 (34.56)
Average precipitation days (≥ 0.01 in)	9.0	7.9	10.4	11.6	12.2	10.2	8.4	7.6	7.2	8.2	8.3	9.5	110.5
Average snowy days (≥ 0.1 in)	2.8	2.4	1.0	0.2	0.0	0.0	0.0	0.0	0.0	0.0	0.3	2.1	8.8
Source 1: NOAA
Source 2: National Weather Service (mean maxima/minima 2006–2020)

== Demographics ==
Historical population
Census	Pop.	Note	%±
1880	211		—
1930	286		—
1940	465		62.6%
1950	794		70.8%
1960	15,829		1,893.6%
1970	20,649		30.5%
1980	18,904		−8.5%
1990	17,550		−7.2%
2000	16,391		−6.6%
2010	15,241		−7.0%
2020	12,096		−20.6%
U.S. Decennial Census

=== Racial and ethnic composition ===
Cahokia village, Illinois – Racial and ethnic composition Note: the US Census treats Hispanic/Latino as an ethnic category. This table excludes Latinos from the racial categories and assigns them to a separate category. Hispanics/Latinos may be of any race.
Race / Ethnicity (NH = Non-Hispanic)	Pop 2000	Pop 2010	Pop 2020	% 2000	% 2010	% 2020
White alone (NH)	9,363	5,126	2,689	57.12%	33.63%	22.23%
Black or African American alone (NH)	6,299	9,455	8,554	38.43%	62.04%	70.72%
Native American or Alaska Native alone (NH)	47	30	43	0.29%	0.20%	0.36%
Asian alone (NH)	61	29	10	0.37%	0.19%	0.08%
Pacific Islander alone (NH)	5	2	6	0.03%	0.01%	0.05%
Other race alone (NH)	12	29	52	0.07%	0.19%	0.43%
Multiracial (NH)	235	272	457	1.43%	1.78%	3.78%
Hispanic or Latino (any race)	369	298	285	2.25%	1.96%	2.36%
Total	16,391	15,241	12,096	100.00%	100.00%	100.00%

=== 2020 census ===
As of the 2020 census, Cahokia had a population of 12,096. The median age was 33.1 years. 29.7% of residents were under the age of 18 and 11.4% of residents were 65 years of age or older. For every 100 females there were 89.7 males, and for every 100 females age 18 and over there were 84.7 males age 18 and over.

100.0% of residents lived in urban areas, while 0.0% lived in rural areas.

There were 4,263 households in Cahokia, of which 38.5% had children under the age of 18 living in them. Of all households, 25.4% were married-couple households, 19.9% were households with a male householder and no spouse or partner present, and 45.1% were households with a female householder and no spouse or partner present. About 25.9% of all households were made up of individuals and 7.9% had someone living alone who was 65 years of age or older.

There were 5,187 housing units, of which 17.8% were vacant. The homeowner vacancy rate was 6.0% and the rental vacancy rate was 10.0%.

=== 2010 census ===
In 2010, the population was 15,241, with 61.3% being African American and 34.5% of the population being White alone.

=== 2000 census ===
As of the 2000 census, 16,391 people, 5,693 households, and 4,252 families were residing in the village. The population density was 1,705.8 inhabitants per square mile (658.6/km^{2}). The 6,213 housing units had an average density of 646.6 per square mile (249.7/km^{2}). The racial makeup of the village was 58.28% White, 38.69% African American, 0.32% Native American, 0.38% Asian, 0.03% Pacific Islander, 0.73% from other races, and 1.56% from two or more races. Hispanics or Latino of any race were 2.25% of the population.

Of the 5,693 households, 41.2% had children under 18 living with them, 43.2% were married couples living together, 25.7% had a female householder with no husband present, and 25.3% were not families. About 20.9% of all households were made up of individuals, and 8.6% had someone living alone who was 65 or older. The average household size was 2.84 and the average family size was 3.27.

In the village, the age distribution was 33.4% under 18, 8.7% from 18 to 24, 29.4% from 25 to 44, 16.9% from 45 to 64, and 11.6% who were 65 or older. The median age was 31 years. For every 100 females, there were 88.7 males. For every 100 females age 18 and over, there were 82.5 males.

The median income for a household in the village was $31,001, and for a family was $35,582. Males had a median income of $31,806 versus $22,429 for females. The per capita income for the village was $14,545. About 22.8% of families and 24.9% of the population were below the poverty line, including 37.0% of those under age 18 and 5.3% of those age 65 or over.

== Transportation ==
Cahokia is home to the St. Louis Downtown Airport, a general aviation facility.

Metro operates the #2 bus route to East St. Louis, Illinois, where connections can be made to the MetroLink light rail to St. Louis.

== Education ==
- Cahokia Unit School District 187 operates public schools.

== Notable people ==
- 18th-century settler Marie Josephte L'Archevêque, her daughter Marie Joseph La Marche (Mme. Le Comte), and granddaughter Marie Josette Languedoc from Cohakia inspired what Governor John Reynolds said was the "truthful" telling of Madam La Compt in Pioneer History of Illinois.
- Terron Armstead - NFL player
- Well Hungarians – country and rock band
- Michael B. Whit - country singer-songwriter

== See also ==
- Battle of St. Louis (1780)
