= Invertebrates of the Indiana Dunes =

Coordinates: 41.648056°N 87.108056°W

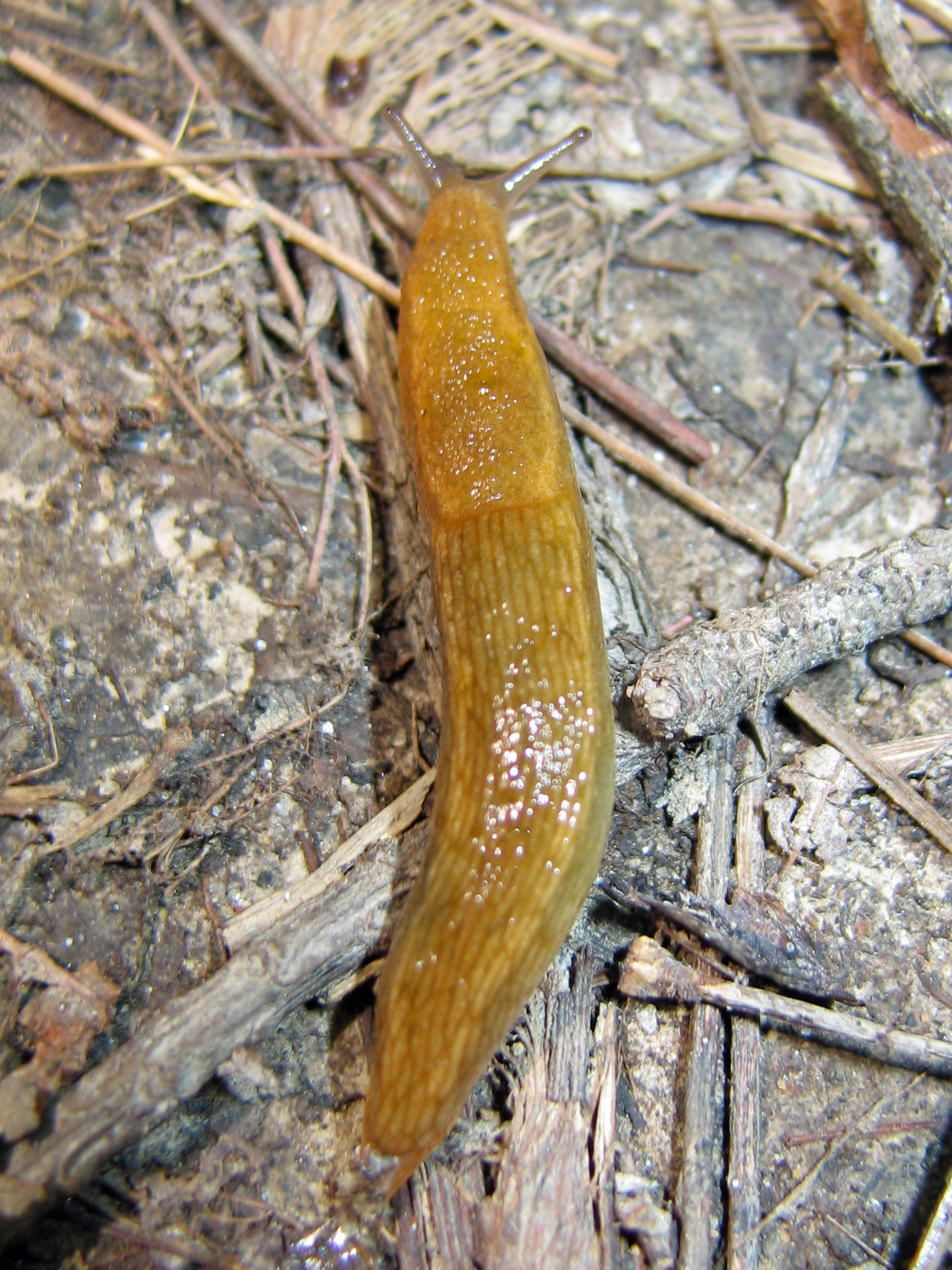

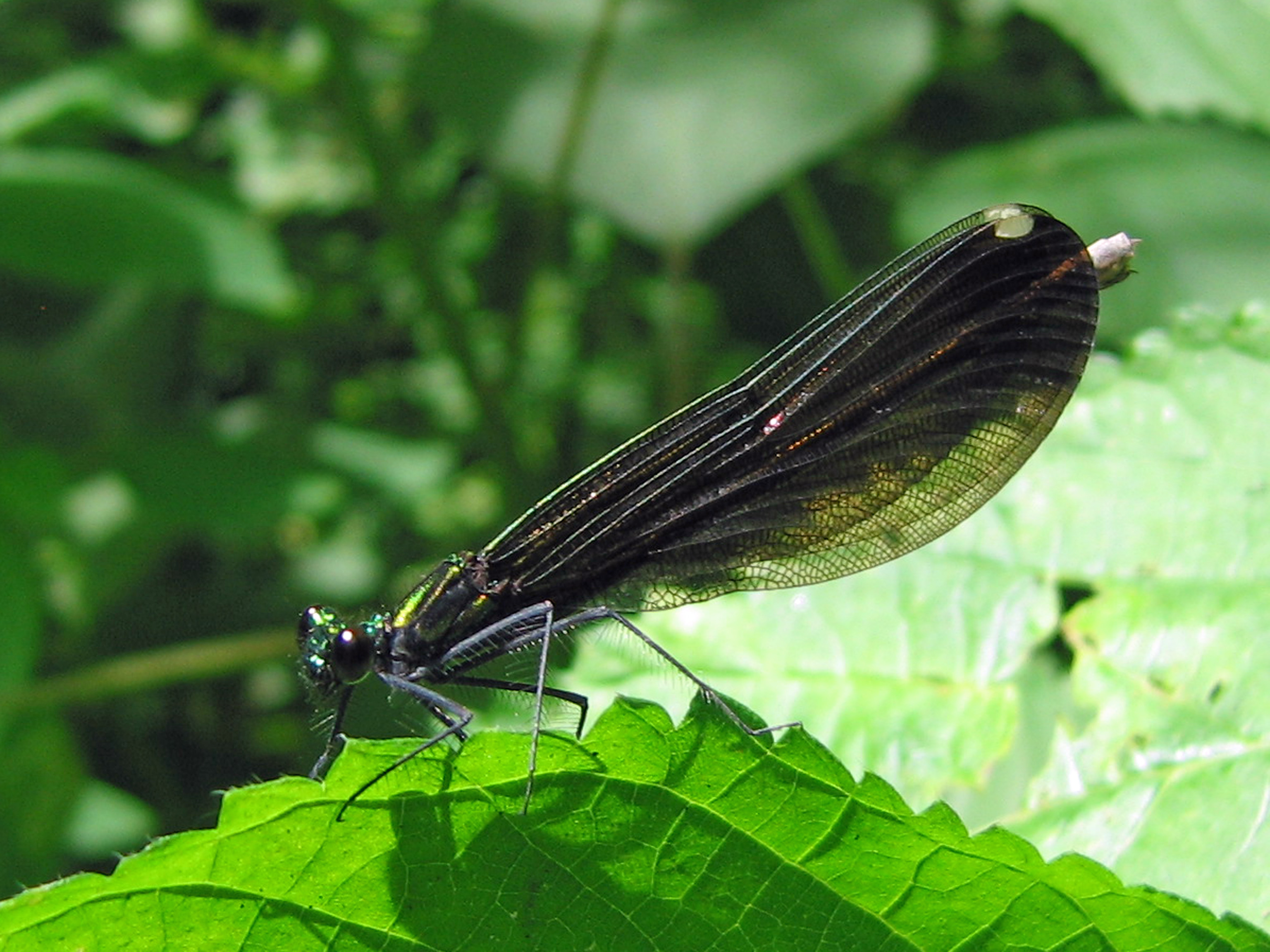

Indiana Dunes National Park is a National Park Service unit on the shore of Lake Michigan in Indiana, United States. A BioBlitz took place there on May 15 and 16, 2009. During that time, a list of organisms was compiled which included invertebrates.

== List of invertebrates other than insects and arachnids ==
Mollusks

For the list of mollusk species - snails, slugs, clams and mussels - please see List of non-marine mollusks of the Indiana Dunes.

Millipedes

1. Diplopoda sp. - millipedes
2. Narceus americanus - North American millipede.

Other invertebrates

1. Trichuridae - roundworms

== See also ==
- List of crustaceans of the Indiana Dunes
- List of Arachnids of the Indiana Dunes
- Insects of the Indiana Dunes
- List of non-marine mollusks of the Indiana Dunes
