= Hazel Hannell =

American artist

- Born: Mary Hazel Johnson; December 31, 1895; La Grange, Illinois, U.S.
- Died: February 6, 2002 (aged 106); Ashland, Oregon, U.S.
- Spouse: Vaino Hannell (m. 1923)

Hazel Hannell (December 31, 1895 – February 6, 2002) was an American artist and activist. She was known for her pottery, watercolors, woodblock prints, activism for the Indiana Dunes National Lakeshore and development of the Chesterton Arts Fair. She taught pottery in her studio at home and watercolor painting at The Clearing Folk School in Ellison Bay, Wisconsin through her connection to fellow Prairie Club member Jens Jensen. She died in Ashland, Oregon while living with Harriet Rex Smith at age 106.

== Education and inspiration (1895 – early 1920s) ==
Mary Hazel Johnson was born in La Grange, Illinois on December 31, 1895, to an Alabama-born father and college graduate mother. She started painting as early as age 5 using her mother's leftover paints. Throughout childhood she studied painting, and by the command of her father, secretarial studies, since to him artistic wages were not predictable ones. While in high school, She also studied at the Saturday morning classes of the Art Institute of Chicago. She graduated from the Emma Church School of Art in Chicago.

For income, Johnson and her friends worked for Marshall Field's designing chintzes. During that time, she became interested in East Asian art and tuned into the "effect of Divine Intelligence through nature on her heart and mind".

== Feminist movement, adventures of employment & marriage (late 1920s – 1930) ==
Hannell first became interested in activism during her college years. In a letter from her nephew Wilbert Reuter to former director of the Brauer Museum of Art, Richard H.W. Brauer, "There was great concern…when she brought disgrace and dishonor upon the entire family, and its name, by appearing in a public demonstration supporting women's suffrage".

While renting a studio from the Church School of Art on Michigan Avenue in Chicago in the 1920s, Johnson met Vaino "Vin" Hannell, a Finnish-American artist whom she marred on December 31, 1923. Oftentimes for money the two were commissioned for a variation of small projects. While living in Chicago in the 1920s, the first pottery of the Hannells' was a group of fountain tiles done for a Chicagoan architect Arthur Hoyne. Hazel recalls that the two "had a reputation for either being able to do things or knowing someone who could" and that they "did all kinds of things; from murals to papering wastebaskets". They worked with Jane Addams at the Hull House for several years, helping to establish and run the House's commercials kilns starting in 1927.

Hannell was inspired to join the Prairie Club, an organization that aimed to ease the ills of industrialization, by a friend because she "admired her and her taste so much". On the weekends, the Hannells visited the Indiana Dunes National Lakeshore with a group of weekend painters including Fred Biesel, Frances Strain, and Harriet Rex Smith, and Jens Jensen. Its beauty also drew artists like Frank Dudley, whose paintings would eventually aid the Dunes preservation projects. Together they walked along the beach and documented its beauty. Her subject matter consists mainly of the flora and fauna in its natural habitat in the Dunes.

The Hannells and Biesels were closely acquainted, and together they led a movement against the conservative jury system in connection with Chicago art exhibits in the 1920s. Vaino was part of The Ten, a radical group that had been instructed by George Bellows at the Art Institute in their production of controversial realism.

In 1928, the couple, along with known artists Frances Strain and Fred Biesel went on a trip to Paris and Finland. While there, they visited with the Dalstroms and the parents of Janet Sullivan, founder of the Art Barn and school of rural Valparaiso. This trip inspired her to repeatedly paint lily-of-the-valley, native to Vin's home in Finland but also to the National Lakeshore. After their return to the States, as well as many weekend trips to the Indiana Dunes to visit Biesel and Strain, the couple bought land for a summer home in Furnessville, Indiana.

== Life in Indiana (1930s–1950s) ==
=== Pottery business ===
After the onset of the Great Depression, Hazel and Vin Hannell moved to their getaway home near the Dunes in 1930, as they could no longer afford rents in Chicago. Hannell tried to get a secretarial job, but was "fired for being impertinent". According to Hannell, "One of the foremen told me to do something and I was annoyed with him and I said, 'I won't'," even though I'd already done it".

In Indiana, Hazel and Vin ran a pottery business. They created a potting studio from a chicken coop, lived off Vin's government pension, and used the regional clay to gain an income from which a living could be sustained. Oftentimes, Hazel designed the pieces and Vin fired them. A feature of the couple in The Gary Post-Tribune spoke of the Hannells' open to the public studio in which, "Vin would probably be watching over the two electric kilns, where the articles are fired," or would be checking "the infra-red, electric lamps, which provide a quick-drying method for the newly made cups and saucers."

Hazel Hannell's work was featured regionally and in Chicago's Merchandise Mart throughout the 1930s. During this period, a wholesaler saw some of their work and offered her a business deal. Former director of Chesterton Art Center Gloria Rector reported, "Hannell once said that her clay pottery was their bread and butter during hard times". "To make a living as a painter, you either have to be a salesman or have a salesman," Hannell explained to the Vidette Messenger in 1983, "Pottery sells itself." In the 1940s, a New York agency offered to market their pottery nationally, putting the Hannells' work into department stores and gift shops all over the United States while providing them with a substantial allowance and publicity. Clem and Nixon Hall of New York, a designer-distributor organization, brought "their years of design and merchandising experience to the end that Hannell pieces fit market demands."

=== Save the Dunes ===
In 1952, Porter County area residents began to hear that the area was being bought up by major steel making facilities. Hazel and Vin became charter members of the Save the Dunes Foundation, and in 1958 the first bill to preserve the Dunes was introduced after bus trips from Save the Dunes Council to testify before Congress. Hazel went on one of these trips to Washington D.C. along with founder Dorothy Buel.

The Hannells also donated some of their land to the Indiana National Lakeshore, claiming they, "wanted Congress to know that the people who didn't want it were not the majority here." Meanwhile, Hannell painted the Indiana National Lakeshore in watercolor, in hopes that they would aid her audience's value of the environment.

=== Chesterton Arts Fair ===
In 1952, Chesterton held its centennial celebration as "Gateway Town of the Dunes" in connection with the Hannells, who promoted a tent show art exhibition. The Modern Artist's Guild, including members such as David Sander and Harriet Rex Smith had works in this tent as well. Gaining sponsorship by the Chesterton Retail Merchants' Association, their tent show developed into the Chesterton Arts Fair, which is now one of the best juried shows in the United States. By 1960 a group of the merchants and artists from the arts and crafts fairs developed into the Association of Artists and Craftsmen of Porter County. First chairman of this association was Ernst Schwidder, former head of the art department at Valparaiso University, which now holds over 35 works by Vaino and Hazel. Meetings for the Association of artists and Craftsmen of Porter County commonly took place in the home of the Hannells.

== Late years (1960s–2002) ==
Hannell's husband died in 1964, but she kept the business alive for 25 years in Furnessville until moving to Ashland, Oregon to live with Rex Smith. Hannell taught watercolor at the Clearing Folk School in Ellison Bay, Wisconsin. This position came from her connection with Jens Jensen, Prairie Club member, Chicagoan Architect and Artist. She also taught pottery in her studio in Furnessville, in Chesterton Art Gallery, until she moved.

In the 1980s, Hannell rented a place in Ajijic, Mexico during the winter months where she went with many artists, including Rex Smith, Elizabeth Murray, and Jan Sullivan. Property previously owned by the Hannells was donated to the Indiana Dunes once Hazel moved away. Russ Nelson from Art & Frame in Valparaiso was the recipient and dealer for the works left behind by Hannell after her move to Oregon in 1988. Sullivan of the Art Barn in Valparaiso hosted a public farewell for Hannell when she left Northwest Indiana, although the friends still visited each other annually. In her public farewell, the Art Barn listed that her work was for sale or rental at the Chicago Art Institute, Collectors Showroom in Chicago, Station Gallery at Crown Point, and the Freight Station and Chesterton Art Gallery.

Once she arrived in Oregon, Hannell began documenting the wild flowers around the area using woodblock prints. She said that the most interesting thing to do was roam the country side with her painting equipment, just as a retired Sung Dynasty Chinese high official or emperor himself were known to do. She was a part of the Chicago Society of Artists, which featured her prints in their 1971 calendar.

== Art style ==
In 1987, Hannel revealed her inspiration to the Chesterton Tribune: "Hamada, a Japanese master potter, says you really ought not have to sign things, your works should be recognizably yours." As Hamada, many of Hazel's works lack signature. Works from earlier years such as her watercolor Self Portrait (1934) bear a signature in the same medium. It is worth noting that upon many of her works a penciled signature has been placed after their departure from her possession.

=== Pottery ===
Many of Hannell's works of pottery were for dinner-time, but the shape and design are identifiably of her hand and design. An article in Craft Ceramist Utopia from the 1950s tells of her "stunning centerpieces of piled up artichokes, onions, peppers, etc., all done in a solid finish of gold of pewter with matching treatment in the dinner wear, enough to transport the buyer to the world of Cellini." Hannell's method of applying the designs to her pottery involved an oriental brush with cobalt (blue), copper oxide (green), iron oxide (brown), and pewter glaze. The beauty of her cobalt pieces is known well among collectors of her work.

Her pieces are not perfect in form and often include bulges or indentations allowing for easy handling. This was done purposefully as a counter to the industrialization against which she often protested. "Some people seem to like the factory-made look," she told the Chesterton Tribune, "I'm a little inclined not to bother with it; the pieces are more interesting if they're not all exactly the same." On the pottery dune grasses can be found, bending in the wind, flora such as the lily-of-the-valley, or privately done calligraphy. Hannell also designed a series of clay angels and women figures such as the Madonna from Indian red clay.

== Exhibitions ==
The Brauer Museum of Art has exhibited her works on several occasions. In 1986, they exhibited the watercolors Spring Rock Garden and Hapatica.

The "Porter County's Artists-Past and Present" exhibition was held in the Chapel of the Resurrection at Valparaiso University in the fall of 1988 which displayed Edge of Swamp. Some of Hannell's floral studies were displayed in August 1989 at Moellering Library. The Ginny and Friends exhibit featured her work not long after in September 1992.

Also in 1992, Hazel was awarded a FRIENDS honorary membership, and donated her "Spring Snow" watercolor into the Brauer Museum of Art's collection. Her Self Portrait (1934) was donated to the same museum as a gift, and then shortly afterward there was a Sloan Gallery and Moellering Library exhibition put on that fall for Hazel's works.

A show by Dankook University had an exhibition done by their Institute of Asian Studies and Cultures, which she took part in because of the inspiration for her works.

Indianapolis Museum of Art, Northern Indiana Art Salon, Gary Southern Shores Exhibit, Dunes Art Foundation, and South Bend Art Center have also displayed her pottery, watercolors, and woodblock prints.
