= Calumet Trail =

Trail in Indiana, United States

Coordinates: 41.639285°N 87.079398°W

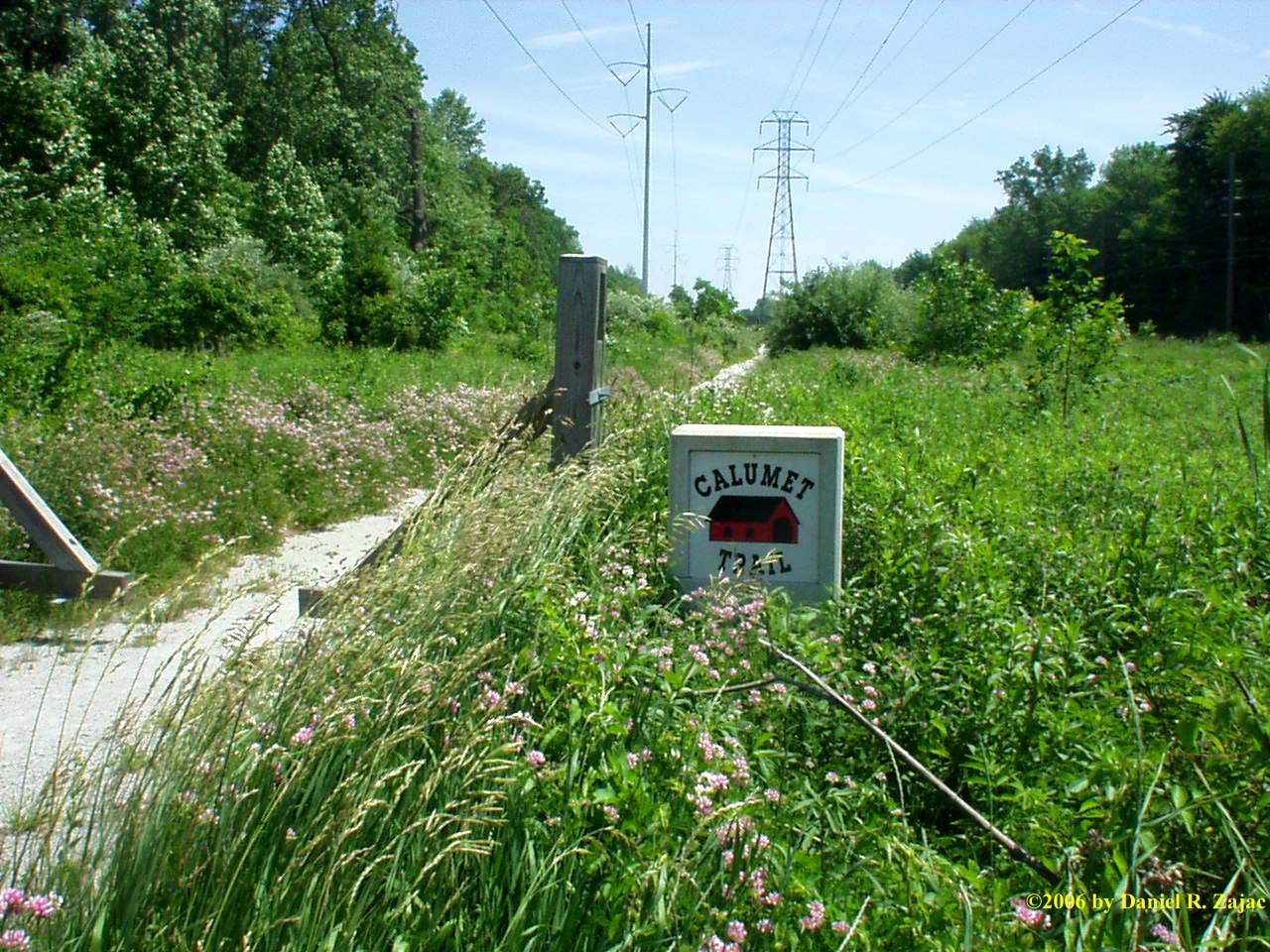
- Looking east from an access point along a section of the Calumet Trail in June
- Length: 9.1 miles (14.6 km)
- Location: Calumet Region, Indiana, US
- Use: Cycling, skateboarding, scootering, personal transporter, and pedestrians
- Difficulty: Easy
- Season: Limited access during winter

The Calumet Trail is an east–west bicycle and multiuse recreational trail in the Calumet region of northwestern Indiana, United States. It runs roughly parallel to U.S. Route 12 and the right-of-way of the South Shore line, along the NIPSCO easement.

The trail runs for about 9.1 miles (14.6 km) from Mineral Springs Road in Dune Acres, Indiana, near Cowles Bog, to a point by the county line of Porter County and LaPorte County, very close to the parking lot entrance of a local sand dune landmark, Mount Baldy. The surface is of crushed limestone and is frequently used by cyclists and joggers in the warmer months, and skiers in the winter.

Deer and other wildlife are often seen along the trail, which loosely connects with other bicycle/multi-use trails in northwestern Indiana in a loose arc from near the Illinois state line to near the Michigan state line, bringing trail users in proximity to Indiana Dunes National Park and Indiana Dunes State Park.

The Calumet Trail is managed by the Porter County Parks Department.

The trail was constructed in 1976, and is the first dedicated bicycle trail in Indiana. At that time, the trail was paved with asphalt blacktop for its entire length. However, the wetlands the trail passes through deteriorated the pavement, and the trail was unusable by the late 1990s. In 2001, the trail was repaired, and the crumbling pavement was replaced with crushed limestone, and the iconic covered bridge over Brown Ditch was constructed. After years of being vandalized, the covered bridge was removed in September 2012.
