= Indiana Dunes National Park =

National park in Indiana, United States

- IUCN category II (national park)
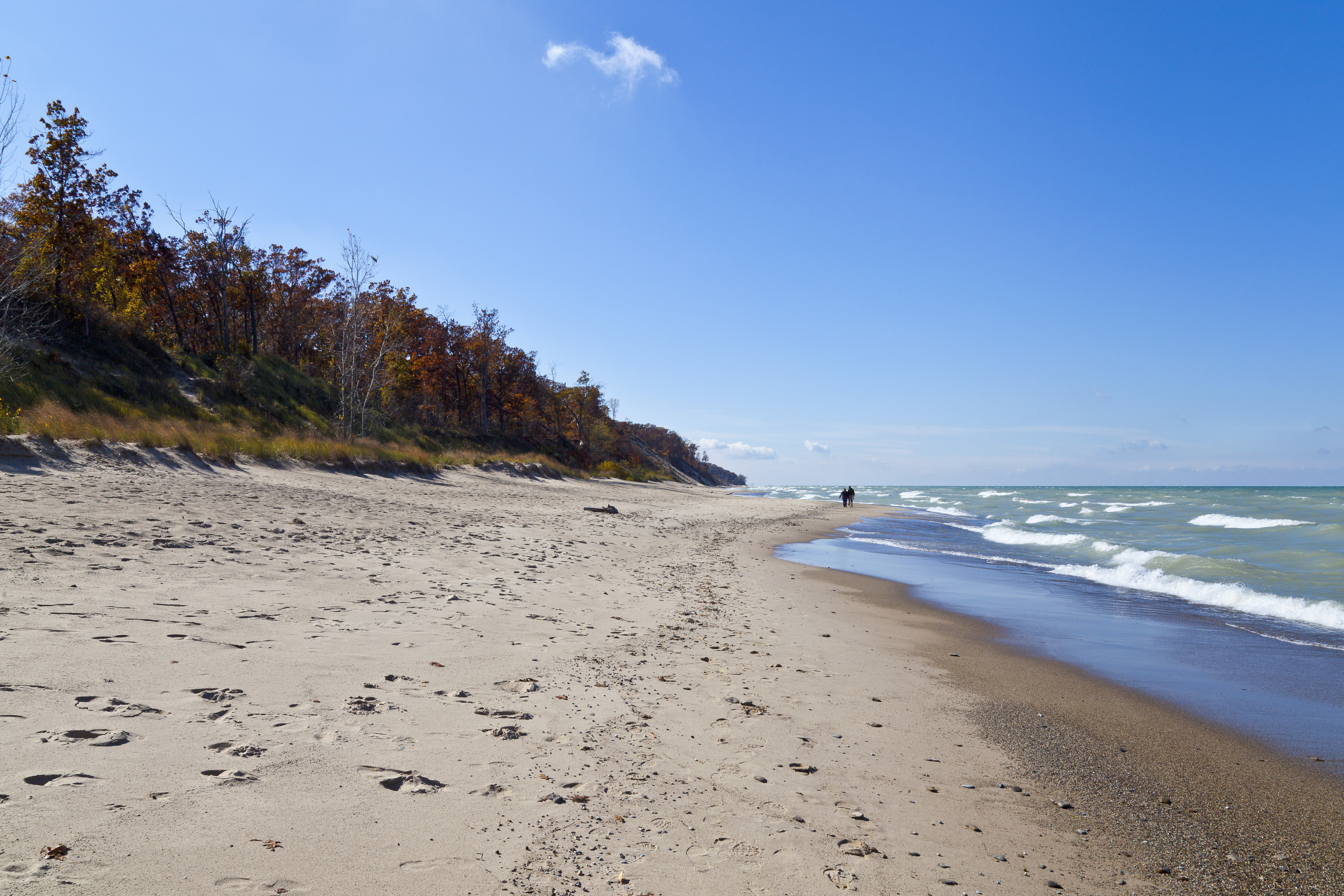
- Interactive map of Indiana Dunes National Park
- Location: Porter County, Lake County and LaPorte County, Indiana, United States
- Nearest city: Beverly Shores, Indiana; Porter, Indiana
- Coordinates: 41°38′53″N 87°06′29″W
- Area: 15,349 acres (62.12 km^{2})
- Established: November 5, 1966 (national lakeshore); February 15, 2019 (national park)
- Visitors: 2,834,180 (in 2022)
- Governing body: National Park Service
- Website: nps.gov/indu

Indiana Dunes National Park is a national park of the United States located in northwestern Indiana managed by the National Park Service. It was authorized by Congress in 1966 as the Indiana Dunes National Lakeshore and was redesignated as the nation's 61st national park on February 15, 2019. The park runs for about 15 miles (24 km) along the southern shore of Lake Michigan and covers 15,349 acres (6,212 ha). Along the lakefront, the eastern area is roughly the lake shore south to U.S. 12 or U.S. 20 between Michigan City, Indiana, on the east and the Cleveland-Cliffs steel plant on the west. This area's conservation scheme is enhanced by the older Indiana Dunes State Park. To the west of the steel plant lies West Beach and a small extension south of the steel mill continues west along Salt Creek to Indiana 249. The western area is roughly the shoreline south to U.S. 12 between the Burns Ditch west to Broadway in downtown Gary, Indiana. In addition, there are several outlying areas, including Pinhook Bog, in LaPorte County to the east; the Heron Rookery in Porter County, the center of the park; and the Hoosier Prairie State Nature Preserve and the Hobart Prairie Grove, both in Lake County, the western end of the park.

== History ==
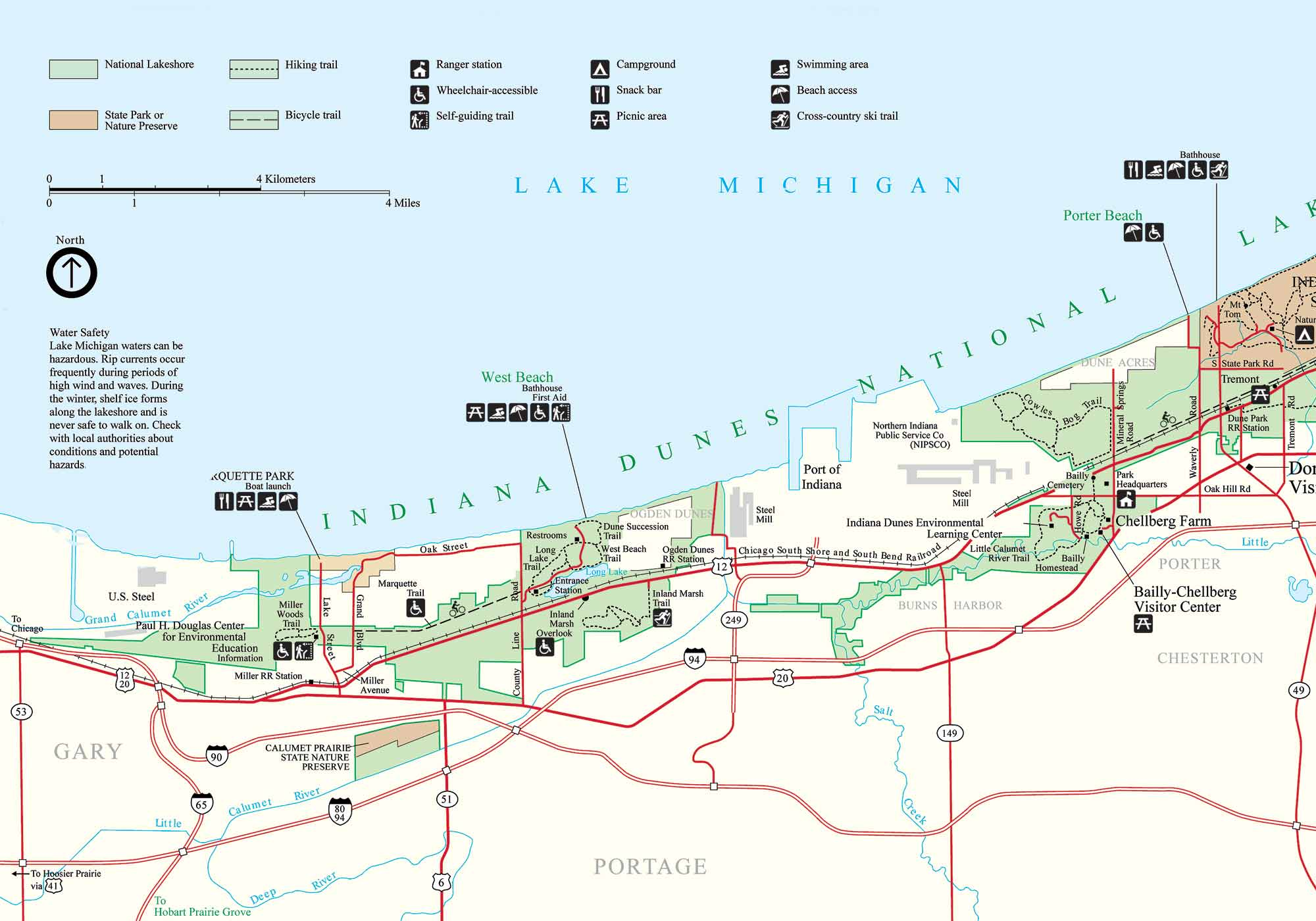
West side of the national park

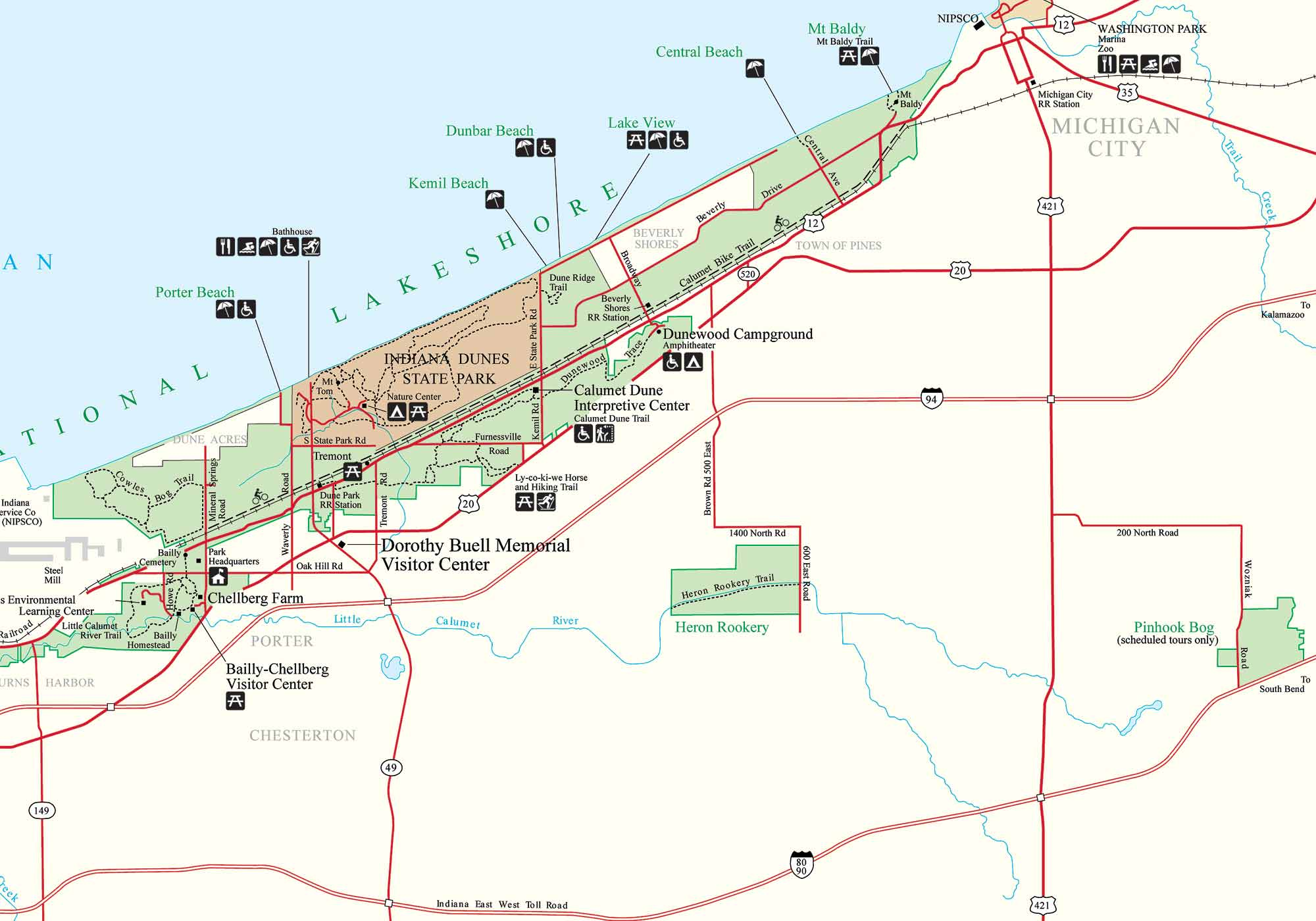
East side of the national park

Little evidence has been found of permanent Native American communities forming during the earlier years; rather, the evidence suggests that seasonal hunting camps were the norm. The earliest evidence for permanent camps was the occupation of the Ohio Valley by the Hopewell culture. Five groups of mounds have been documented in the dunes area. These mounds are consistent with the period of 200 BCE (Goodall Focus) to 800 CE (early Mississippian), though even that was a short lived permanency. Beginning in the 1500s, European exploration and trade introduced more changes to the human environment. Tribal animosities and traditional European competition affected tribal relations. Entire populations began moving westward, while others sought to dominate large geographic trading areas. Once again, the dunes became a middle point on a journey from the east or the west and continued to remain a key hunting ground for villages over a wide area.

Native villages once again were scattered through the area beginning in the 19th century, but this was soon followed by European settlement. Joseph Bailly was the earliest recorded settler in the dunes. He moved from trading villages around Niles, Michigan and settled along the Calumet River. Soon he was joined by a series of other settlers and the communities in the dunes began to develop. They included Chesterton, Porter, Tremont, and the Town of the Pines. These pioneer communities grew and expanded.

City West was one of several "ghost towns" situated in the dunes. Planned as a rival to Chicago, it was partly built in 1837 but failed that summer, during a national economic panic. The remains of the town, partly carted off to be used as lumber, were located near where the pavilion in the state park now stands, until a forest fire in the 1850s destroyed whatever was left. Today, most of the coastline has been settled for use as homes, factories, and businesses, with some areas reserved for public parks.

=== Preserving the dunes and National Lakeshore ===
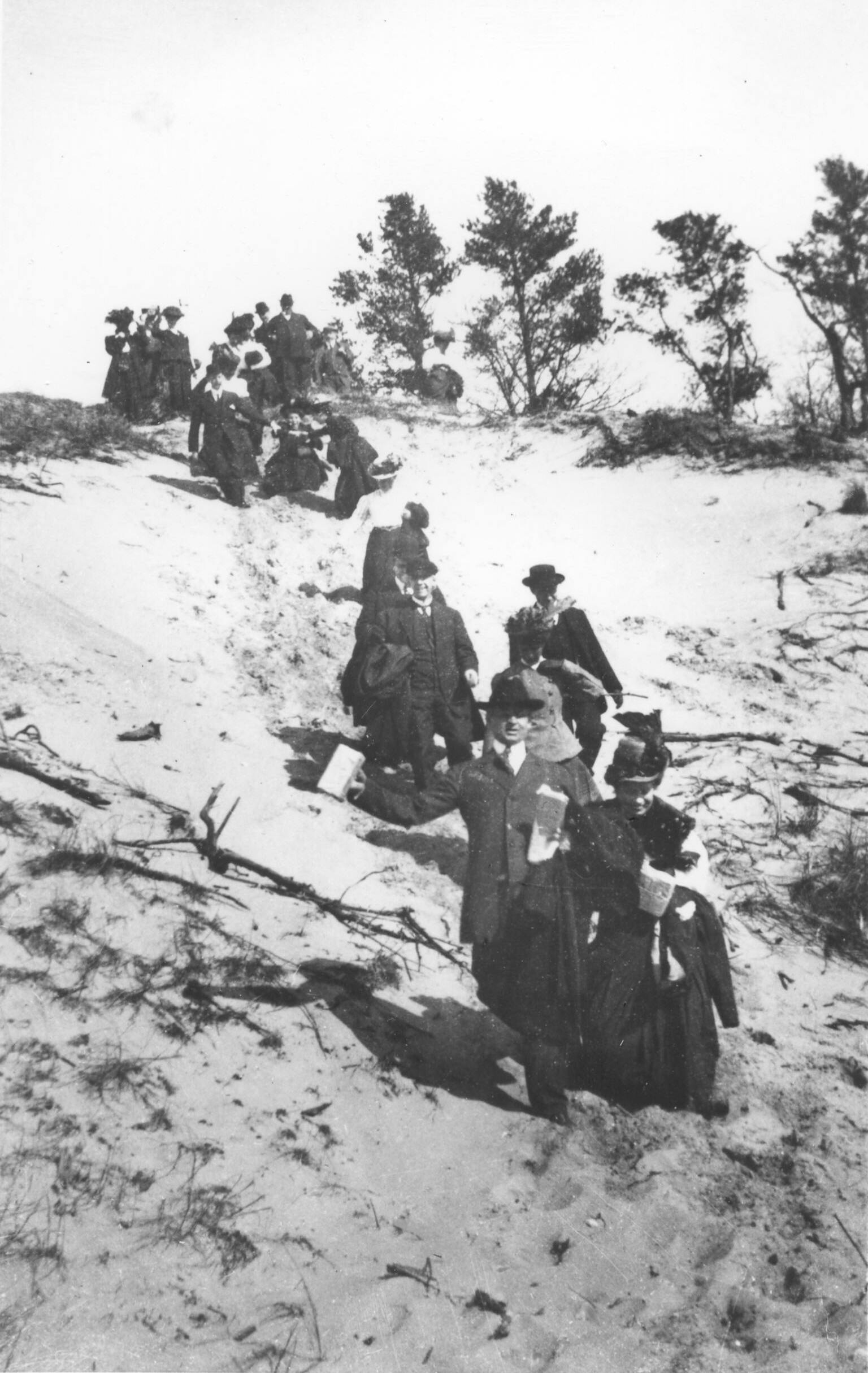
Steven Mather visits the Indiana Dunes.

Triggered by a publication on the unique flora of the dunes in the 1899 Botanical Gazette by University of Chicago botanist Henry Chandler Cowles, a movement began to preserve the dunes habitat. In 1916, the visionary National Parks Director Stephen Mather held hearings in Chicago on a "Sand Dunes National Park". Another factor leading to the desire to preserve the dunes was the disappearance of the Hoosier Slide, a particularly large dune along this shore. The sand from this dune was found to be ideal for glass manufacture, and much of this sand was transported to the Ball Brothers and Hemingray Glass Co. plants in Muncie, producing the well-known 'Ball Blue' canning jars and 'Hemingray Blue' insulators. The Hoosier Slide was completely consumed by 1920, and a power plant sits on the site today. In 1926, the Indiana Dunes State Park opened. In the 1950s, a desire to maximize economic development through a "Port of Indiana" spurred interest in preservation. The Save the Dunes Council, including its president Dorothy Richardson Buell and activist Hazel Hannell, began a nationwide campaign to buy the land. Their first success was the purchase of 56 acres (23 ha) in Porter County, the Cowles Tamarack Bog. The Kennedy Compromise entailed the creation of a national lakeshore and a port. Illinois Senator Paul H. Douglas led the Congressional effort to save the dunes. In late 1966, the bill passed and the Indiana Dunes National Lakeshore became a reality. Four subsequent expansion bills for the park (1976, 1980, 1986, and 1992) have increased the size of the park to more than 15,000 acres (61 km^{2}).

=== Redesignation as National Park ===
A bill to reclassify Indiana Dunes National Lakeshore as Indiana Dunes National Park was sponsored by Representative Pete Visclosky and Senators Todd Young and Mike Braun and previously by Senator Joe Donnelly, who wanted to bring the site more recognition. Deputy Director of the National Park Service Paul Daniel Smith testified that the Service opposed the redesignation because it would be inconsistent with the Service's naming conventions and the Indiana Dunes have more in common with other national lakeshores and seashores than national parks, which are typically much larger.

H.R. 1488 originally passed in the House of Representatives on November 1, 2017, but it did not receive a vote in the Senate during the 115th Congress. The Consolidated Appropriations Act of 2019 included the bill as a provision and was signed by President Donald Trump on February 15, creating the country's 61st National Park and the first in Indiana.

== Geography ==
The creeks and rivers of the national park include:

- Dunes Creek is a northwards-flowing 4.3-mile-long (6.9 km) stream which drains the flows northward, receiving first the Great Marsh tributary from the east and then the West Branch tributary which drains Cowles Bog. Dunes Creek passes through the coastal sand dunes to empty into Lake Michigan.
- East Arm Little Calumet River, also known as the "East Branch Little Calumet River", is a 22.1-mile-long (35.6 km) portion of the Little Calumet River that begins just east of Holmesville, Indiana, in New Durham Township in LaPorte County and flows west to Porter County where it is diverted to the Port of Indiana-Burns Waterway and Lake Michigan.
- Salt Creek is a 24.0-mile-long (38.6 km) tributary of the East Arm Little Calumet River that begins south of Valparaiso in Porter County, Indiana, and flows north until it joins the East Arm Little Calumet River just before it exits to Lake Michigan via the Port of Indiana-Burns Waterway.
- Trail Creek is a 7.3-mile-long (11.7 km) north- by northwest-flowing stream whose main stem begins at the confluence of the West Branch Trail Creek and the East Branch Trail Creek in LaPorte County, Indiana, and flows through the Michigan City harbor into Lake Michigan.

== Climate ==
According to the Köppen climate classification system, Indiana Dunes National Park has a hot summer Humid continental climate (Dfa). According to the United States Department of Agriculture, the plant hardiness zone at Indiana Dunes National Park at 614 ft (187 m) is 6a with an average annual extreme minimum temperature of −9.4 °F (−23.0 °C).

The primary feature of Indiana Dunes National Park is Lake Michigan. The lake brings with it several weather-related conditions that can create threats to the enjoyment of the area.

- Winter: Winter months bring the risk of shelf ice. This is a condition where the winter winds push ice from Lake Michigan onto the beaches. As the cold depends, the ice can build up into long ridges creating an arctic dunescape. Much of this ice is floating. It may be dangerous to walk on the ice as there can be air pockets into which you can sink. Rescue is extremely difficult.
- Summer: During the summer months, rip currents can occur in Lake Michigan. These occur suddenly and can sweep swimmers far out into the lake. Rip currents are most prevalent on days with a strong north wind. Rip currents are created when masses of water are pushed against the shoreline by a north wind. The mass of water becomes trapped between the beach and the first sandbar. As the wind continues, the volume of water increases until weight of incoming water and the mass of the sandbar are unable push back the growing volume of water behind the sandbar. Then, the trapped water creates a narrow channel through the sandbar. The water rushes back into the lake forming a river in the lake. Anything or anyone in the current is taken out into the lake.

Climate data for Indiana Dunes National Lakeshore, Indiana, 1991–2020 normals, extremes 1989–present
Month	Jan	Feb	Mar	Apr	May	Jun	Jul	Aug	Sep	Oct	Nov	Dec	Year
Record high °F (°C)	66 (19)	72 (22)	85 (29)	88 (31)	95 (35)	98 (37)	102 (39)	98 (37)	96 (36)	89 (32)	77 (25)	69 (21)	102 (39)
Mean maximum °F (°C)	52.5 (11.4)	56.6 (13.7)	70.0 (21.1)	79.4 (26.3)	86.9 (30.5)	91.3 (32.9)	92.7 (33.7)	91.4 (33.0)	88.9 (31.6)	81.8 (27.7)	68.1 (20.1)	56.7 (13.7)	94.4 (34.7)
Mean daily maximum °F (°C)	32.1 (0.1)	35.5 (1.9)	45.6 (7.6)	57.2 (14.0)	68.4 (20.2)	77.5 (25.3)	81.6 (27.6)	80.0 (26.7)	74.3 (23.5)	62.3 (16.8)	48.7 (9.3)	37.4 (3.0)	58.4 (14.7)
Daily mean °F (°C)	24.9 (−3.9)	28.3 (−2.1)	37.7 (3.2)	48.4 (9.1)	59.0 (15.0)	68.5 (20.3)	73.0 (22.8)	71.6 (22.0)	65.3 (18.5)	53.5 (11.9)	41.5 (5.3)	30.8 (−0.7)	50.2 (10.1)
Mean daily minimum °F (°C)	17.8 (−7.9)	21.1 (−6.1)	29.8 (−1.2)	39.5 (4.2)	49.6 (9.8)	59.5 (15.3)	64.3 (17.9)	63.1 (17.3)	56.3 (13.5)	44.7 (7.1)	34.2 (1.2)	24.1 (−4.4)	42.0 (5.6)
Mean minimum °F (°C)	−3.7 (−19.8)	2.0 (−16.7)	12.6 (−10.8)	26.0 (−3.3)	35.5 (1.9)	44.5 (6.9)	52.8 (11.6)	52.6 (11.4)	42.5 (5.8)	31.5 (−0.3)	20.2 (−6.6)	5.2 (−14.9)	−7.3 (−21.8)
Record low °F (°C)	−22 (−30)	−15 (−26)	−4 (−20)	18 (−8)	31 (−1)	37 (3)	45 (7)	46 (8)	35 (2)	23 (−5)	7 (−14)	−19 (−28)	−22 (−30)
Average precipitation inches (mm)	2.21 (56)	1.97 (50)	2.34 (59)	3.55 (90)	4.27 (108)	4.31 (109)	3.98 (101)	4.08 (104)	3.65 (93)	3.75 (95)	2.76 (70)	2.29 (58)	39.16 (995)
Average snowfall inches (cm)	16.0 (41)	9.7 (25)	6.0 (15)	0.6 (1.5)	0.0 (0.0)	0.0 (0.0)	0.0 (0.0)	0.0 (0.0)	0.0 (0.0)	0.0 (0.0)	0.7 (1.8)	7.3 (19)	40.3 (102)
Average precipitation days (≥ 0.01 in)	12.6	9.0	10.9	11.3	12.3	11.7	9.7	9.9	9.6	11.5	10.6	11.9	131.0
Average snowy days (≥ 0.1 in)	8.4	5.6	3.4	0.6	0.0	0.0	0.0	0.0	0.0	0.0	1.0	5.7	24.7
Source: NOAA

== Geology ==
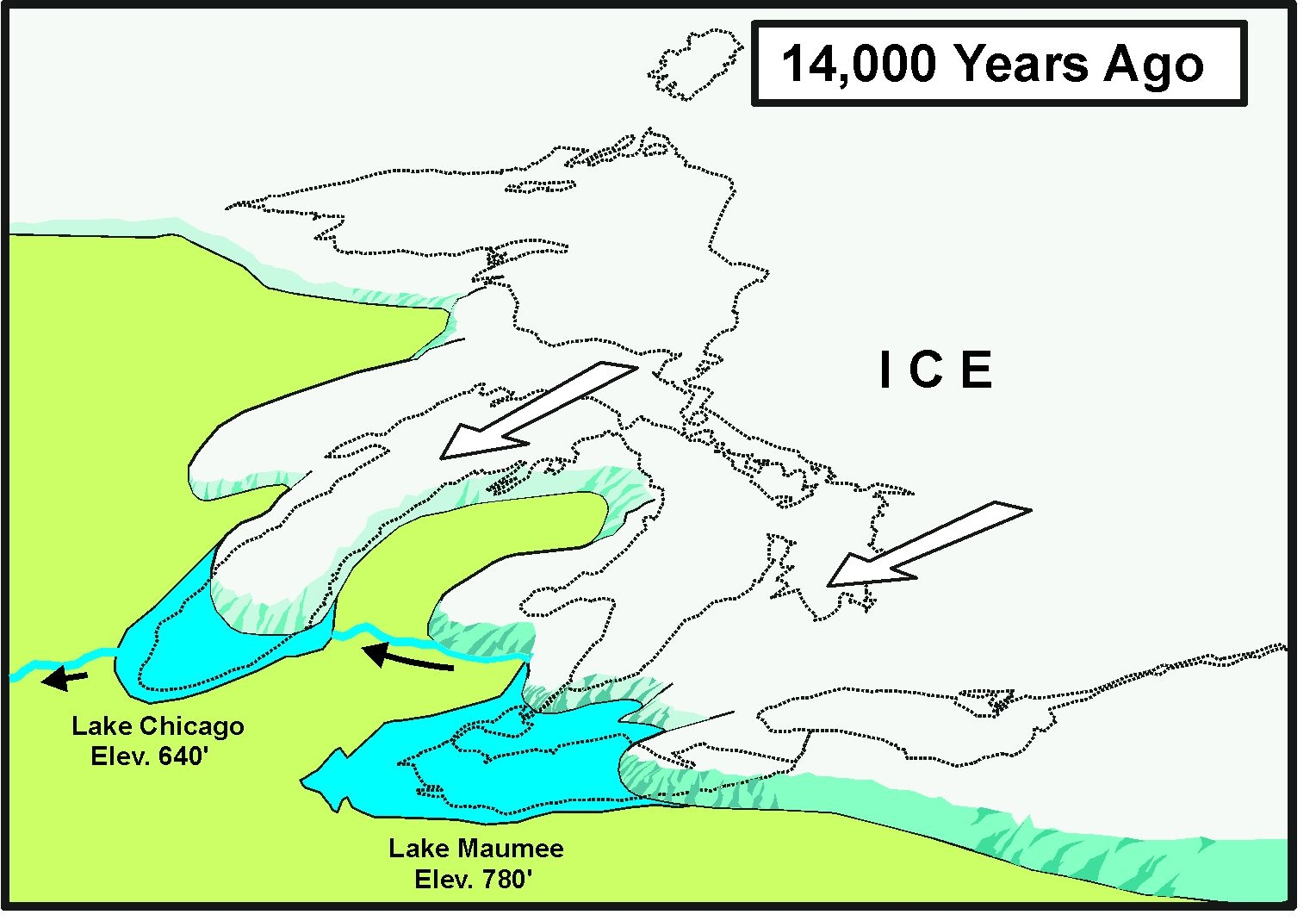
Glacial Lake Chicago, 14,000 years before present. In this map, the present dunes park area is covered by the lake at left. Formation of the dunes is in part due to action of the advancing and receding melt water.

The Lake Michigan Basin was formed during the Wisconsin Glacial Period. The Michigan Lobe of the continental glacier began its retreat northward over 20,000 years before present (YBP) forming the southern shore of the Lake Michigan Basin.

The Valparaiso Moraine is the dominant geologic form that created the various landscape forms of the Indiana Dunes about 40,000 YBP. Within the arc created by the Valparaiso Moraine are the two younger recessional moraines of the Tinley Moraine and the Lake Border Moraine. Each moraine created a dam across the southern outflow of the melt waters of the receding glaciers. As each glacial lake breached a low spot in the moraines, water levels receded, leaving a series of shorelines and dune ridges.

The Calumet Shoreline is the oldest visible shoreline of Lake Michigan. It is a visible sand ridge along Ridge Road through Lake and Porter Counties, Indiana. Two older shorelines, the Tolleston and the Glenwood Shoreline are much harder to identify and further south in those counties.

During the periods of glacial retreat, there were periods of stability. During these times, glacial lakes formed along the southern borders of the glaciers, bound into the Lake Michigan Basin by the recessional moraines. Four major glacial lake periods created the Indiana Dunes. They are the glacial Lake Chicago (14,000 YBP), glacial Lake Algonquin (9,000 YBP), glacial Lake Chippewa (7,000 YBP), and the Nipissing Great Lakes stage (4,000 YBP). Once the glaciers had fully retreated from the Lake Michigan basin, after the Lake Nipissing stage, the same factors that created the dunes south of the current shoreline, expanded the existing shoreline. The littoral currents or Longshore drift transport sand southward along the eastern shore of Lake Michigan. As they encounter streams bringing water from inland, sandbars are created, pointing down current, either southward if the shore is north to south or westward along the southern shore itself. If the currents were strong enough, as they were when the Glenwood Shoreline was created, shallow inland bays would be formed with a wide sand spit between each bay and the open lake. Over time, the sand spits would merge with the far shoreline, forming interdunal ponds. Each sand spit would become a dune ridge. As the ponds filled in and wind built the outer sand ridges higher, the ponds would dry up and only a stream would remain, as with the Little Calumet River today, just south of the state and national parks. As the shoreline moved northward, new ridges formed along with additional streams, now slower and less powerful, and the process duplicated itself. To the west of the Indiana Dunes, Wolf Lake in Hammond, Indiana, forms a western border to the dunes. Here the same process is at work, only the littoral drift is again south, but along the western shore, pushing the sand and sand spits eastward. Today, it is the remnants of the marsh lands and inter-dunal or inter-sand spit lakes that have formed this region over 40,000 years.

== Flora and fauna ==
The park is in the central forest-grasslands transition ecoregion.

According to the A. W. Kuchler U.S. Potential natural vegetation Types, Indiana Dunes National Park has an Oak/Hickory (100) potential vegetation type and an Eastern Hardwood forest, aka Temperate broadleaf and mixed forest (26) potential vegetation form.

=== Rare, threatened, and endangered species ===
The park includes habitats for several rare plants and animals. The park has more than 1,400 species of vascular plants, ranking it 8th in total plant species among all units of the National Park System. At least two plant species are on the Federal list of Threatened and Endangered Species:

- Mead's milkweed (Asclepias meadii)
- Pitcher's thistle (Cirsium pitcheri)

Several others are on the list of state T&E species. Populations of each plant group are estimated to be around 100–120 individual plants. The species included are:

- White baneberry (Actaea pachypoda)
- Virginia snake root (Aristolochia serpentaria)
- Shooting star (Dodecatheon meadia)
- American columbo (Frasera caroliniensis)
- Pink corydalis (Corydalis sempervirens)

Among the federally threatened and endangered wildlife are:

- Indiana bat (Myotis sodalis)
- Eastern massasauga rattlesnake (Sistrurus catenatus catenatus)
- Rufa Red knot (Calidris canutus rufa)
- Piping plover (Charadrius melodus)

In addition, the park has habitat suitable for the bald eagle (Haliaeetus leucocephalus).

=== Species count ===
Group	Number of species	Extirpated species	Main article
Chordates or Animals with Backbones
Mammals or Mammalia	41	11	Mammals of the Indiana Dunes
Birds or Aves	352	2	Birds of the Indiana Dunes
Reptiles or Reptilia	23		List of reptiles of the Indiana Dunes
Amphibians or Amphibia	18		List of amphibians of the Indiana Dunes
Fish	71		List of fish of the Indiana Dunes
Invertebrate or Animals without Backbones
Arthropoda (Crustacea)-Crustacean	15		List of crustaceans of the Indiana Dunes
Arthropoda (Chelicerata)-Arachnida	12		List of arachnids of the Indiana Dunes
Arthropoda (Chelicerata)-Insects	296		
Arthropoda (Myriapoda)- Other invertebrates	2		Invertebrates of Indiana Dunes
Annelida-segmented worms			
Mollusca	66		List of non-marine mollusks of the Indiana Dunes
Plants or Plantae
Vascular plant−ferns.	26		
Vascular plant-clubmosses			
Vascular plant-flowering plants	1,130		
Vascular plant-conifers			
Vascular plant-gymnosperms.			
Bryophytes – Bryophyta (mosses), Marchantiophyta (liverworts), and Anthocerotophyta (hornworts).	41		
Algae – especially the green algae.			
Invasive plants	54		List of invasive plant species in the Indiana Dunes
Other life forms
Fungi	64		
Lichens – algae and fungi in a symbiotic arrangement	62	92	Change in the number of species between 1896 (Calkins) and 1986 (Wetmore)
Plankton	33		
Total to date	2,336	105	

=== Wildlife ===
Indiana Dunes National Park is host to wide variety of wildlife, including white-tailed deer, red fox, raccoons, opossums, cottontail rabbits, various rodents, Canada geese, gulls, squirrels, hawks, turkey vultures, mallards, great blue herons, songbirds, and garter snakes. Recent records, documented photographically, indicate that North American river otter (Lontra canadensis) and bobcat (Lynx rufus) began returning to the area in 2011 and 2018, respectively. As of 2023, the Indiana Audubon observed nearly 370 bird species living in or migrating through the Indiana Dunes.

=== Flowering plants ===
Indiana Dunes has over 369 species of flowering plants. Of these, thirteen are considered threatened or in danger of extinction. Additionally, there four invasive flowering plants on the list. Some of the most common spring flowers include the May apple, buttercups (six varieties), and violets (14 varieties). Summer brings out the orchids (five varieties) and much goldenrod (11 varieties).

=== Invasive plants ===
Invasive plants are those introduced species that dominate a landscape pushing out traditionally native species and others species by their ability to multiply rapidly. There are 54 such species in the dunes.

=== Unusual sightings ===
In October 1920, a rare Arctic three-toed woodpecker was captured a mile west of Dune Park Station. Later that month another male was captured east of Dune Park Station. One was busy digging out grubs and the other was nervously flying from tree to tree.

In May 1919, a clay-colored sparrow was found near Dune Park. It was a part of a larger flock of Harris's sparrow migrating along the western shore of Lake Michigan.

=== Extirpated species ===
Several species of plants and animals have disappeared from the dunes. Few can be clearly identified. Among those species thought to be gone are listed below:

Species	Latin Name	Last Seen
Eastern cougar	Puma concolor couguar	1830
American bison	Bison bison	1731
Elk/Wapiti	Cervus canadensis canadensis	1830
Canada lynx	Lynx canadensis	1880
Bobcat	Lynx rufus	1880
Gray wolf	Canis lupus	1908
Red wolf	Canis rufus	1832
American black bear	Ursus americanus	1850
Fisher	Pekania pennanti	1855
River otter	Lontra canadensis	1900
Porcupine	Erethizon dorsatum	1918
Passenger pigeon	Ectopistes migratorius	1900, extinct
Piping plover	Charadrius melodus	

=== Exotic and invasive species ===
Alien or exotic species are plants and animals which are not native to the area. These plants can be classified as Invasive if they rapidly replace other plants and animals in the ecosystem, creating a monoculture and threatening the extinction of the traditional plants and animals. Among plants found in the park, the following are considered to be exotic. Those marked with an '*' are listed as invasive.

- Yarrow, (Achillea millefolium)
- Tree of heaven, (Ailanthus altissima)*
- Garlic mustard, (Alliaria petiolata)*
- Japanese barberry, (Berberis thunbergii)*
- Oriental bittersweet, (Celastrus orbiculatus)*
- Ox-eye daisy, (Chrysanthemum leucanthemum pinnatifidum)
- Field thistle, (Cirsium arvense)*
- Common day-flower, (Commelina communis)
- Queen Anne's lace, (Daucus carota)
- Autumn olive, (Elaeagnus umbellata)*
- Creeping Charlie, (Glechoma hederacea)*
- Yellow downy bush honeysuckle, (Lonicera × muendeniensis)
- Bush honeysuckle, (Lonicera tatarica)*
- English plantain, (Plantago lanceolata)
- Japanese knotweed, (Reynoutria japonica, syn. Polygonum cuspidatum)*
- Sulphur cinquefoil, (Potentilla recta)
- All-heal, (Prunella spp.)
- Apple, (Pyrus malus)
- Black locust, (Robinia pseudoacacia)*
- Northern catalpa, (Catalpa speciosa)*

=== BioBlitz ===
On May 15 and 16, 2009, the park hosted an All Taxa Biological Diversity survey. In a 24-hour period, as part of the BioBlitz 2,000 students and thousands of additional volunteers surveyed the park for every available living species. John Francis, vice president of research, conservation and exploration for the National Geographic Society, stated that 890 species had been inventoried. The tally at the close of the 24 hours was 890 species, including 26 amphibians and reptiles, 101 birds, 18 fish, 27 fungi, 11 mammals, 410 plants, and 178 insects. The tally had risen to 1,200 unique species by June 1.

== Natural areas ==
=== Calumet Prairie ===
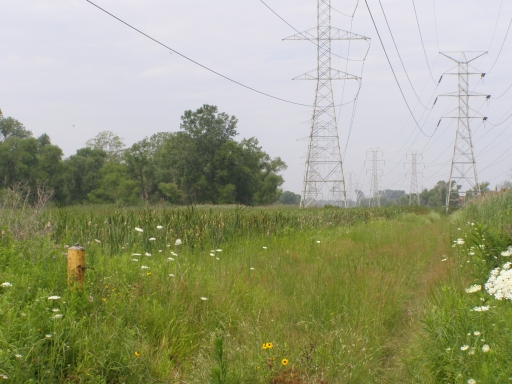
Calumet Prairie

Calumet Prairie is a joint venture between the National Park Service and the Indiana Department of Natural Resources. The Calumet Prairie State Nature Preserve in the northern portion of the land between Interstate 90 to the north and the Little Calumet River on the south. The National Park owns the southern half of this plot.

=== Cowles Bog ===
Cowles Bog, a National Natural Landmark, is a wetland complex containing bog, fen, marsh, swamp, wet meadow, and pond habitats; named in honor of biologist and ecologist Henry Chandler Cowles. Located south and west of Dune Acres, Indiana, Cowles Bog is the sole remnant of the "Central Dunes" where Cowles performed his pioneering field studies of ecological succession and species diversity. The complex is drained by Dunes Creek, which flows to Lake Michigan at the Indiana Dunes State Park swimming beach. A National Park trail runs from Mineral Springs Road into Cowles Bog.

=== Great Marsh ===
The Great Marsh is an interdunal wetland just south of the dune ridge overlooking Lake Michigan. It stretches from steel plants in Burns Harbor, 12 miles (19 km) east to County Line Road on the edge of Michigan City. A century ago, it was the nesting and migratory layover for many birds which depended on its variety of plants. In the late 19th century, the marsh was drained through a series of ditches, creating three watersheds and reducing the water table. As the water levels changed, new plants and trees moved in, creating a new habitat and displacing the wildlife that was dependent on the pre-existing wetlands.

- Native plants & animals
  - Coots
  - Mallards
  - Wood ducks
  - Kingfishers
  - Tree swallows
  - Rusty blackbirds
  - Green herons
  - Beaver
  - sedges
- Invasive plants
  - Common reed
  - Hybrid cattail
  - Reed canary grass
  - Green ash
  - Cottonwood
  - Silver maple

- Restoration

Beginning in 1998, the national lakeshore began restoration of the marsh by closing Derby Ditch and restoring 500 acres (200 ha). The work consists of:

  - Plugging culverts
  - Filling ditches
  - Creating levees with spillways
  - Planting native plants, either as seed or small sprouts
  - Removing non-native plants and trees

=== Heron Rookery ===
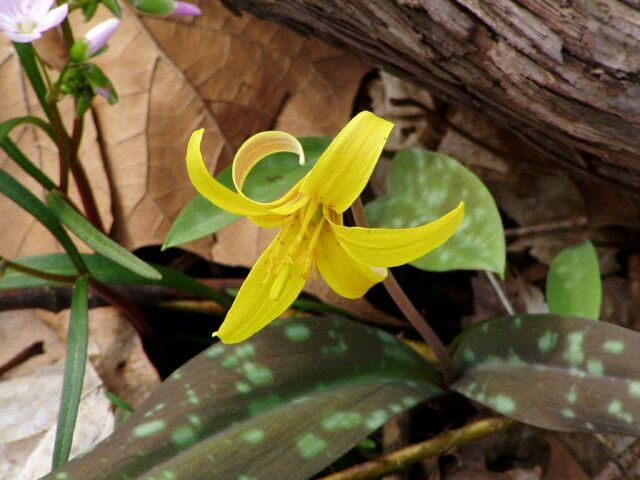
Yellow trout-lily

The heron rookery is located along the East Arm Little Calumet River in the northeast corner of Porter County. The rookery is physically separated from the main part of the park. It is accessible from County Road 600 East, south of County Road 1400 North. The rookery is a hardwood forest. The great blue heron nests for which the site is named are no longer a feature of the area. Spring brings out a variety of wildflowers.

=== Hobart Prairie Grove ===
Hobart Prairie Grove is an area of forested ravines along the west shore of Lake George. The Hobart Prairie Grove preserves several habitats including wetlands, prairie remnants, white oak flatlands, and a rare bur oak savanna. At about 300 acres (120 ha), the grove contains 343 native plants and a variety of birds and animals. The unique soil is at least 70 percent silt and clay with some sand. The soil supports a diversity of life. The Hobart Woodland trail is a .05-mile (0.080 km) walk to an overlook on Lake George from the Oak Savannah rail trail. The Oak Savannah rail trail runs from North Hobart Road, Hobart to South Colfax Street, Griffith. Of the trails 9-mile (14 km) length, 2 miles (3.2 km) are through the Hobart Prairie Grove. The trail follows the old Elgin, Joliet and Eastern Railroad route and connects with the Prairie Duneland rail trail, continuing east to Chesterton.

=== Hoosier Prairie ===
Hoosier Prairie, a National Natural Landmark, is a 430-acre (170 ha) tallgrass prairie adjacent to Griffith, Indiana. It is a geographically isolated unit of the park, owned and maintained by the Indiana Department of Natural Resources as a state nature preserve. Some 574 species of plants have been observed growing in this patch of prairie.

=== Miller Woods ===
Miller Woods is located in Miller Beach, Indiana. It is accessed through the Paul H. Douglas Center for Environmental Education on Lake Street. The area is dominated by ridge and swale topography. the ridges or swells are beach and dune sand. They date from the post Glacial Lake Nipissing period some 3000 years before present. The swales are the depressions between the ridges. They are generally either ponds or marshes.

=== Mnoké Prairie ===
Mnoké Prairie is an active prairie restoration along Beam Street in the central portion of the park. The prairie's name was suggested by Potawatomi elders; "mno" means good, "ké" means earth. It is pronounced "mno-ca" (the second syllable is like the word "cat" without the "t".) The Little Calumet River Trail provides access through the prairie. It is accessible from the Mnoké Prairie parking lot on Beam Street.

=== Mount Baldy ===
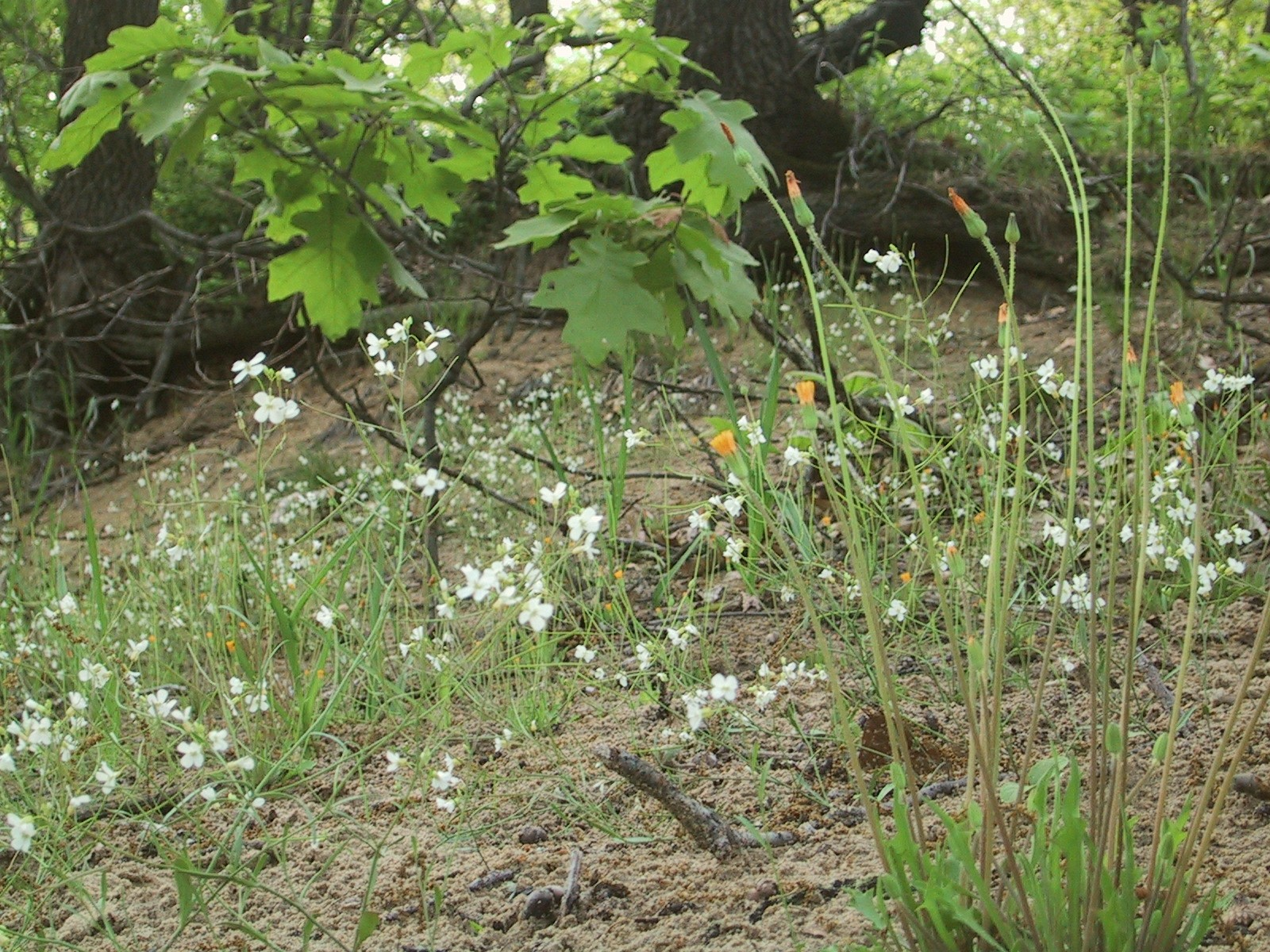
Typical wildflowers near Mount Baldy. Plants such as these help hold the dune together.

Mount Baldy is a sand dune located at the east end of the park. At 123 feet (37 m) tall, it is one of the tallest sand dunes on the southern shore of Lake Michigan. It is a wandering dune that moves an average of 4 feet (1.2 m) every year, and so is called a "living dune". Mount Baldy is accessible from U.S. Route 12 (also known as Dunes Highway) between the Town of Pines and the western border of Michigan City. Visitors were formerly allowed to hike 0.7 miles (1.1 km) up the dune. As of July 2018, much of the dune itself, including the summit, was closed to allow beach grasses and other native plants to regenerate, and prevent injuries to visitors. An alternative trail leading to the beach takes visitors directly past the dune, cresting just slightly lower than the summit itself. On a clear day, there are views of Lake Michigan, Chicago's skyline, and south shore, from this point.

=== Pinhook Bog ===
Pinhook Bog, a National Natural Landmark, is a geographically isolated unit of the national park. The quaking peat bog is located near U.S. Route 421 approximately 9 miles (14 km) south of Michigan City. The bog formed from a postglacial kettle moraine left behind about 14,000 years before the present by the melting of the ice sheet during the end of the last glacial period. The acidic bog is noted for pitcher plants and other wetland species. Access to the bog is restricted to ranger-led guided tours.

== Historic areas ==
=== Bailly Homestead ===
This is the location of the pioneer trading post established in 1822 by fur trade pioneer Joseph Bailly. Bailly settled here and his last home, adapted from his 1830s retirement house, survives. The Homestead was designated a U.S. National Historic Landmark in 1962.

=== Chellberg Farm ===
The real estate became the home of the Chellberg family, who built a farm on its sandy soil. As of 2008, the park maintains a heritage farm on the Chellberg land, with the Bailly family cemetery on the northern edge of the property.

=== Bailly Cemetery ===
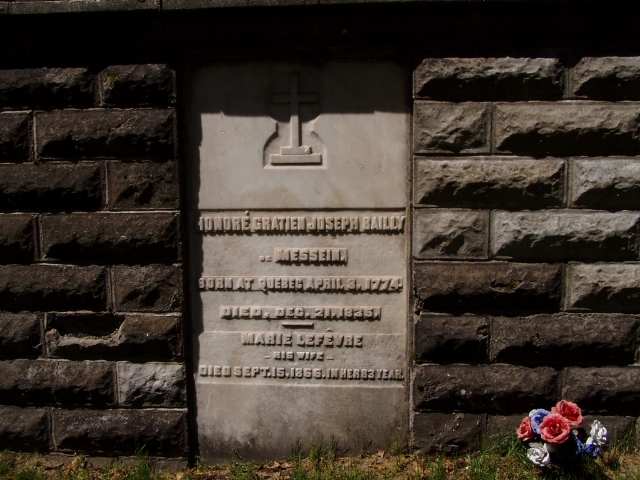

The Bailly Cemetery is located half a mile north of the homestead. Its location is a sandy bluff, which once looked out across the dunes to Lake Michigan. Today, the forest covers the dunes and the lake is not visible. Numerous changes have occurred since the first burial in 1827.

Joseph Bailly buried his only son by Marie in the fall of 1827 on a sandy knoll. He erected an oak cross on the site and a three-sided shelter. After 1866, the Bailly area was no longer the quiet place that it had been. Other families now lived in the area and some had been using the cemetery for their families as well. However, late in 1866, Rose Howe (granddaughter of Joseph Bailly) had the family plots fenced and requested that those other families remove their deceased to other cemeteries. In 1879, she had the entire cemetery walled in and an iron gate installed to the north.

Finally in 1914, Rose Howe took one further step to protect the cemetery of her family. She had the area inside the wall filled with sand. Stone steps replaced the gate to a contemplative walk atop the cemetery. An oaken cross was raised atop this new ground, continuing the tradition started by her grandfather. Rose Howe died in 1916, while in California. She was returned to Indiana in 1917 and was the last burial in the family cemetery.

=== Century of Progress Architectural District ===
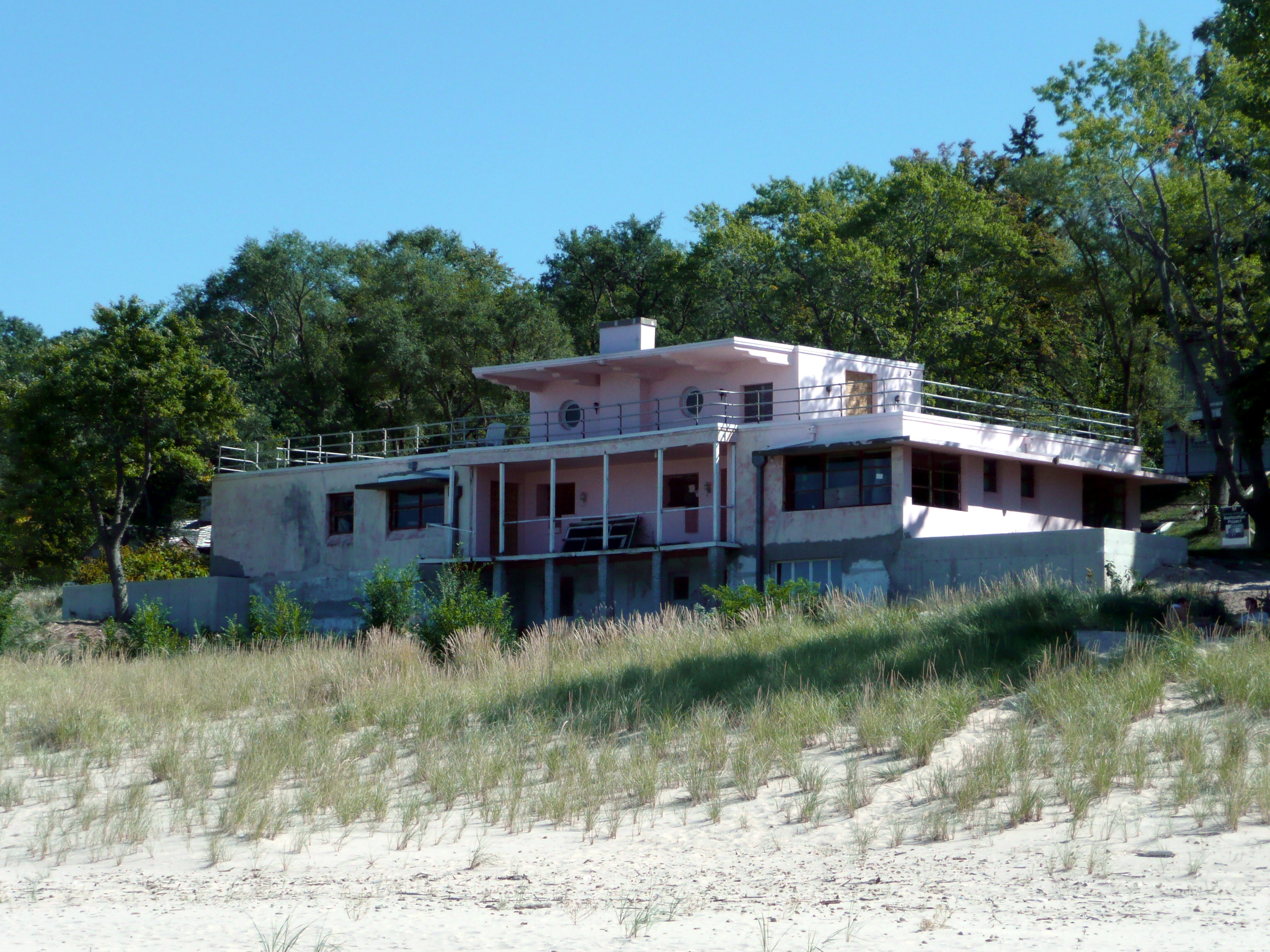
The Florida Tropical House, back elevation taken from the beach

The Century of Progress Architectural District is listed on the National Register of Historic Places and is located in the east portion of the park. The district consists of a total of five buildings, all from the Homes of Tomorrow Exhibition during the 1933 Century of Progress World's Fair which took place in Chicago.

=== Good Fellow Club Youth Camp ===
Created by the Good Fellow Club of U.S. Steel in 1941, the camp served the children of Gary, until 1977. It provided outdoor recreation and a chance to leave the city behind for a week or more. The camp used tent cabins with a central restroom and shower house. Atop a rise was the main lodge where meals were provided and a trading post with a bowling alley were maintained.

=== Lustron Homes ===
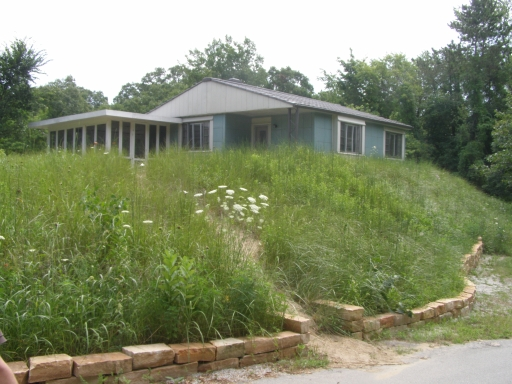
Lustron House on Drake Avenue

The national park acquired three Lustron houses during its land acquisition process. The Jacob Klien House was located in an endangered habitat. It was moved to the east side of Drake Avenue in Beverly Shores and placed atop a dune overlooking the lake. The Schulof house located on Lakefront Drive was transferred to the Historic Landmarks Foundation of Indiana for preservation and was moved to Stephens Street in Porter. The Powell house remains inaccessible within the park on Lakefront Drive.

=== Swedish Farmsteads Historic District (pending) ===
The Swedish Farmsteads of Porter County, Indiana, are representative of the numerous rural communities settled by a significant ethnic population. They influenced the religious community and social community. Swedish immigration was at its highest from 1840 until 1920. At its height in 1910, it was estimated that 1 out of every 5 Swedes was living in the United States.

== Recreation ==
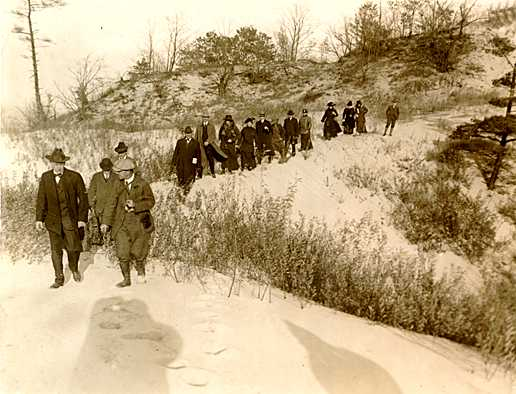
Richard Lieber (front right) with NPS Director Stephen Mather at what would become Indiana Dunes State Park in 1916

The park contains 15 miles (24 km) of beaches, as well as sand dunes, bogs, marshes, swamps, fens, prairies, rivers, oak savannas, and woodland forests. The park is also noted for its singing sands. More than 350 species of birds have been observed in the park. It has one of the most diverse plant communities of any unit in the U.S. National Park System with 1418 vascular plant species including 90 threatened or endangered ones. The Indiana Dunes area is unique in that it contains both Arctic and boreal plants (such as the bearberry) alongside desert plants (such as the prickly pear cactus).

First-time visitors to the park often go to the Dorothy Buell Memorial Visitor Center at U.S. Route 20 and Indiana Route 49, near Porter. This center offers standard visitor-center amenities, including a video, brochures, hands-on exhibits, and a gift shop. It is free to the general public.

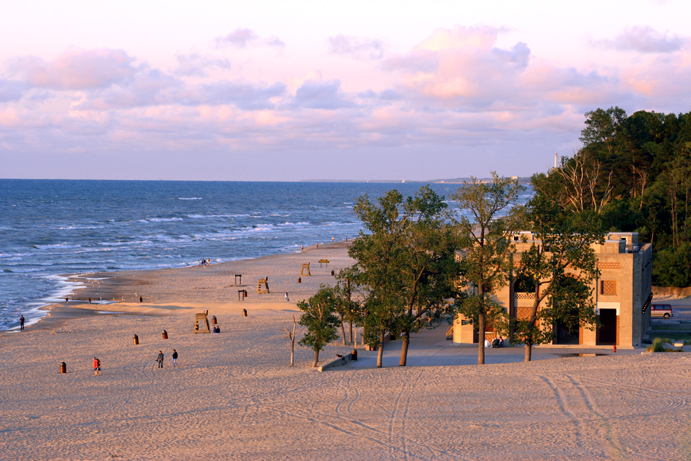
Indiana Dunes State Park Bathhouse and Pavilion – Chesterton, Indiana

Camping is available at the Dunewood Campground on U.S. Route 12. The campground includes an RV dump station and two loops of trailer accessible sites (some with pull-through drives). All sites have grills, a picnic table, and access to restrooms with running water and showers. There are a limited number of walk-in sites in the Douglas Loop.

The park provides opportunities for bird watching, camping, 45 miles (72 km) of hiking, fishing, swimming, horseback riding, and cross-country skiing. Cycling is available on the Calumet Trail, a crushed limestone multiuse trail which runs through the eastern section of the park, providing access to Indiana Dunes State Park, as well as to the communities of Beverly Shores; the Town of Pines; and Mount Baldy on the edge of Michigan City, Indiana. The Great Marsh Trail opened in 2010 with an accessible, paved section usable by wheelchairs opening in fall 2012. The trail is off Broadway in the east end of the park. The park has about 2 million visits a year. Rules state not to feed any of the wildlife, including seagulls, deer, or raccoons. Collecting crinoid fossils on the beach is strictly prohibited. Possession or use of a metal detector is also prohibited – as in all national parks.

Interpretation (interp.) employees provide free walks and talks throughout the park on a regular basis. The Singing Sands, the official newspaper of the national park is published semi-annually with a listing of Interp.- lead activities. Events in 2013, showed that on large dunes unexpected sink holes may develop. Scientists concluded these are caused by buried trees that eventually decay causing cavities.

=== Trails ===
Indiana Dunes has numerous short hike trails and a few longer distance trails:

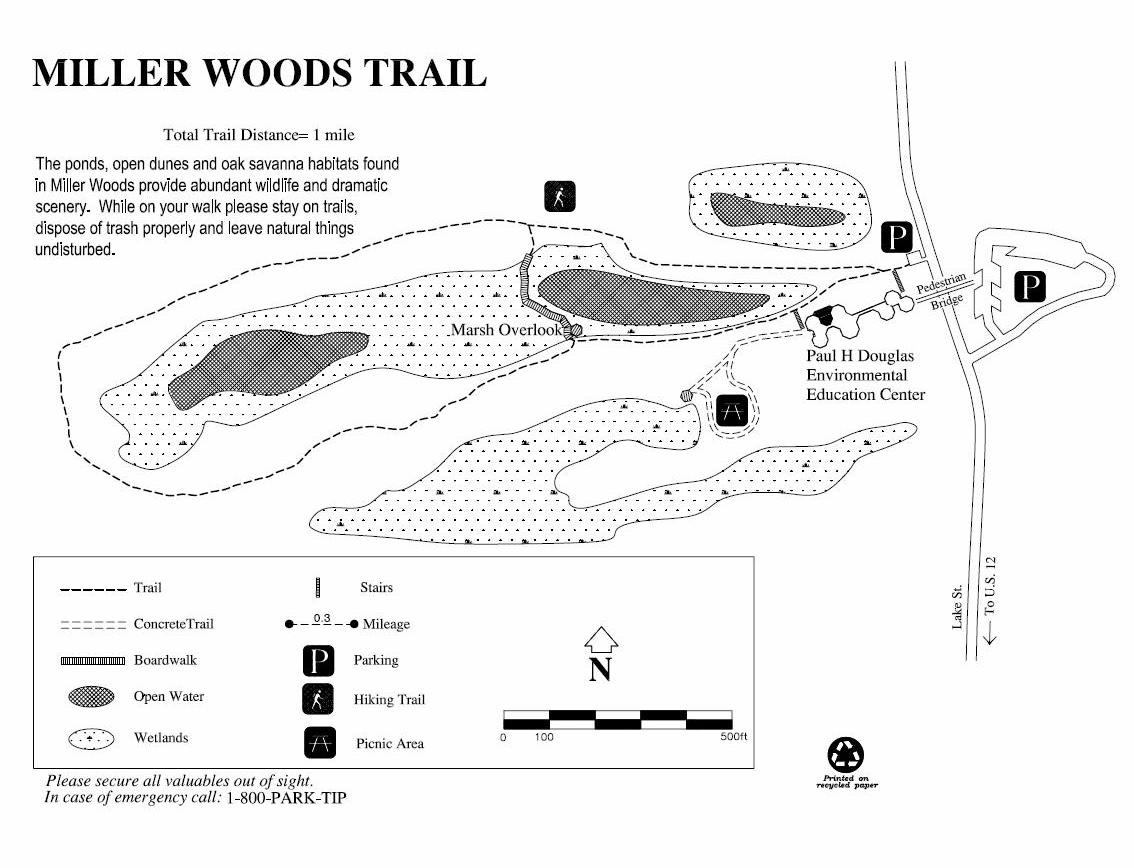
Map of the Paul H. Douglas Trail

- Paul H. Douglas Trail, formerly the Miller Woods Trail, is located off Lake Street in Gary's Miller Beach community. The trail is fully accessible from a parking lot just north of the Douglas Center for Environmental Education.
- Tolleston Dune overlook is a short accessible walk through the treetops to a dune ridge overlook of the vast inland marsh. For a more in depth experiences, the Tolleston Dune trail consists of two loops forming a 3-mile (4.8 km) walk around the through the marsh and oak savannas. Both trails start along U.S. 12, just east of the Porter-Lake County Line Road and the West Beach unit of the park in the Town of Ogden Dunes.
- Succession Trail is located at West Beach. The trail climbs into the high dunes, and while mostly on boardwalk and stairways, the climb is steep. This trail is about 1 mile (1.6 km) long.
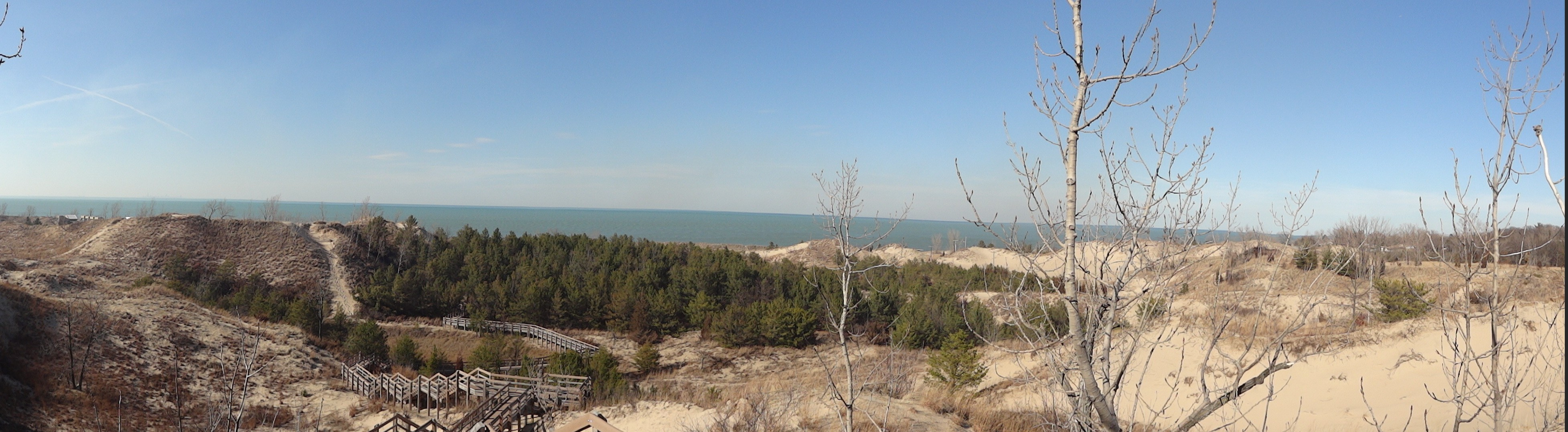
Succession Trail arriving at the beach
- Bailly-Chellberg Trails is a series of interconnected trails. Primarily, it consists of two loops through the historic area around the Bailly Homestead and the Chellberg Farm. This 2.5-mile (4.0 km) trail takes visitors to a second growth forest, where the trees had once been removed for farming or timber harvest. Included along the north spur is a trip the Bailly Cemetery.
- The Little Calumet River Trail offers an opportunity to visit a restored prairie and the flood plain of the East Arm Little Calumet River. Both represent the land before settlers arrived. This 2.2-mile (3.5 km) trail can be reached from the Bailly-Chellburg Trails by walking west from the Homestead to Howe Road, then following it across the East Arm Little Calumet River and up through the wetland overlook and parking lot for Mnoke Prairie. This trail ends near the north end of the two loops of the Bailly Chellberg Trails, or visitors can walk from the parking area at Howe Road

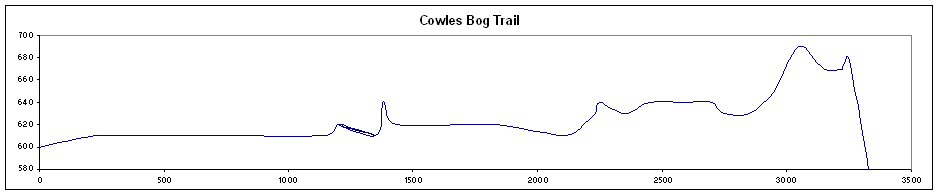
Contours of the Cowles Bog Trail from the trailhead to Lake Michigan. Distances shown in yards/meters.

- Cowles Bog Trail is reached off of North Mineral Springs Road. Parking is to the east of the guard shack for Dune Acres. This 5-mile (8.0 km) loop is one of the most rugged trails in the park. Visitors begin with a long level walk skirting the wetlands of the Cowles Bog complex and the dune ridges to the north. Following the first fork to the north, they must climb through the dunes until they reach Lake Michigan. This is one of the least crowded areas of the park. Upon return, visitors can take the west part of the loop. Again through the dunes, covered with northern white cedars, black oaks and a variety of trees, visitors will again see inter-dunal wetlands, the open beach, and the long, flat Cowles Bog wetland complex. To complete the full 5 miles (8.0 km), visitors need to continue west around the wetlands to the parking area at Mineral Sproad crossing, with parking available at Mineral Springs Road, Dune Park station, Calumet Dunes Trail Park, and at U.S. 12, where it crosses the South Shore Tracks, just west of Michigan City.
- The Calumet Dune Trail is fully accessible from the Calumet Dunes Interpretive Center (Kemil Road at U.S. 12). The trail is 0.8 miles (1.3 km) long and fully paved. Here, visitors may observe a mature wetland forest.
- The far western end of the Calumet Dune Trail links to the Glenwood Dune Horse and Hiking Trail. The Horse trail is 6.4 miles (10.3 km) long and is accessible by horses and hikers from its own parking lot at U.S. 20 just west of Kemil Road. Visitors must bring their own horses.

=== Burnham Plan trails ===
The Marquette Plan, a Lakeshore Investment Strategy for Indiana, is composed of two key elements. A 50-mile (80 km) trail is planned to cross Indiana to link Illinois, Indiana, and Michigan communities along the Lake Michigan shore. There are planned both land trails for bicycles and hikers and a blue water trail for kayakers.

==== Water Trail ====
The Lake Michigan Water Trail, was designated a National Recreation Trail in 2011 and currently extends 45 miles (72 km) from Chicago's Northerly Island to Michigan City's Millennium Plaza.

==== Long Distance Hike/Bike Trail ====
There will be links to major parks and a wide variety of cultural and natural sites. The 9-mile (14 km) Calumet Trail will eventually connect the eastern and western segments of Indiana Dunes National Park. The 3-mile (4.8 km) Porter Brickyard Trail opened in 2012 as part of the Burnham Plan Centennial. It will link several community hike/bike trails to the Calumet Hike/Bike trail creating a link between the Lake County communities and Michigan City. Northwestern Indiana Regional Planning Commission is guiding the work with assistance from local governments, the National Park Service, private landowners, and the American Planning Association.

=== Lake Michigan ===
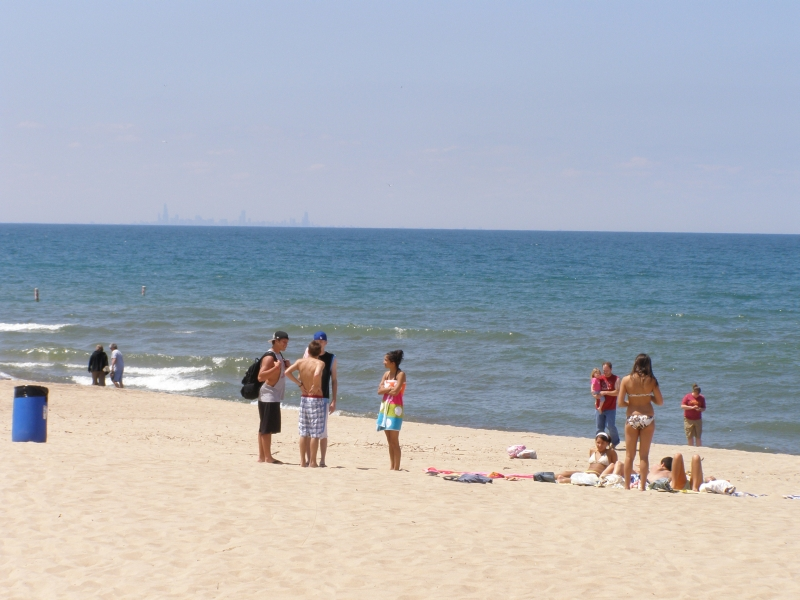
Chicago visible across Lake Michigan from West Beach, Indiana Dunes National Park

West Beach, located adjacent to U.S. Route 12 and County Line Road, lies on the border of Gary and Portage, Indiana. It is a geographically separated section of the park that is preserved as a piece of public beach access and an example of the same theme of plant succession as is found in Cowles Bog. This section of the park displays most of the successive stages of Indiana Dunes biotic progression, from open beach sands to mature Eastern Black Oak forest. The 0.7-mile (1.1 km) West Beach Succession Trail opened in 2007 and features different stages of plant succession in the beach and inland dunes.

The Portage Lakefront and Riverwalk was completed in 2009 as a project of the National Park Service, Northwest Indiana Regional Development Authority, and the City of Portage. The National Park Service owns the site and all facilities. The site is operated by the City of Portage through a cooperative management agreement.

Porter Beach, located north of U.S. Route 12, is a small, public sand beach within Indiana Dunes National Park. The surrounding area is residential and is governed by the town of Porter.

- Kemil Beach
- Lake View
- Central Avenue Beach
- Mt. Baldy

== Education ==
=== Public programs ===
- Maple Sugar Time: For two weeks every spring, an opportunity to make maple sugar is offered. Visitors learn how Native Americans gathered sap and learn about maple trees and pioneer sugaring. In the sugar shack, the sap is boiled down into maple sugar and syrup.
- Kids' Fun at the Visitor Center: Every Sunday afternoon, a ranger meets with children to explore the Dorothy Buell Memorial Visitor Center and for an afternoon of activities.
- Paul H. Douglas Center Open House: During the spring and the fall, families and a park ranger can explore Miller Woods. Each month, from 1:00 to 4:00 pm at the Paul H. Douglas Center, a different program is featured.
- Threatened Lake Michigan: Several times a year, visitors and a ranger at the Dorothy Buell Memorial Visitor Center can explore some of the greatest threats facing Lake Michigan. From 1:00 to 2:00 pm, visitors learn about the spiny water flea, round goby and zebra mussel, their impacts on Lake Michigan and how to thwart invasive species.
- Spring Blooms Hike: A ranger is met at the Dorothy Buell Memorial Visitor Center and carpooled to the week's best trail, where the forest is explored for wildflowers and other signs of spring. Several times each spring, from 1:00 to 3:00 pm, a group will study the park's wildflowers.

=== Rail programs ===
Indiana Dunes National Park partners with the non-profit 501(c)(3) American Passenger Rail Heritage Foundation to provide on-board educational programs for train passengers on the South Shore Line. On select Saturdays, interpretive guides with the APRHF Rail Rangers ride roundtrip between Millennium Station and South Bend International Airport station to provide narration about the park and the other sites passengers see outside their window.

=== Professional development ===
During the academic year, Indiana Dunes National Park and the Dunes Learning Center (DLC) provide professional development opportunities for teachers in the K–12 setting. Workshops feature experts in various fields of study, hands-on activities, and adventures within the national park. Illinois and Indiana teachers can receive continuing education units (CEUs) or continuing recertification units (CRUs) for each workshops. Those teachers wishing to earn graduate credit can do so through Indiana University Northwest and Chicago State University. Workshops are held at the DLC.

=== Sister park ===
The park has a sister park relationship with Poland's Kampinos National Park.

== Accessibility ==
The park can be accessed by car from U.S. Route 12. Access by rail is provided by the South Shore Line at Dune Park station.

Indiana Dunes is working to provide access to beach areas. Access to the waters of Lake Michigan is a challenging problem. Presently, two beach access areas are considered accessible: West Beach, Portage Lakefront and Riverwalk,

Accessible parking and restroom services are available throughout the park. A standard wheelchair is available for loan at the Paul H. Douglas Center.

- West Beach Bathhouse
- Paul H. Douglas Center for Environmental Education
- Dorothy Buell Memorial Visitor Center. Hearing Assist devices are available in the theater.

== Facilities ==
- Dunewood Campground is located in the east section of the park, south of U.S. Route 12 at Broadway. The facility has 78 campsites (53 drive-in some drive through and 25 walk-in). Both the Douglass and Mather loops have restrooms with showers and a wheelchair accessible site. The campground is open from April 1 through October 31. There is a fee.
- Dorothy Buell Memorial Visitor Center is located at 1215 N. State Road 49, just off State Route 49 south of the intersection with U.S. Route 20. The visitor center includes exhibits on the national park and a display of artwork created in the lakeshore. The center is jointly operated by the National Park Service and the Porter County Visitor and Recreation Commission (PCCRVC). The visitor center is open daily, except Thanksgiving, Christmas, and New Years.
- Bailly/Chellberg Contact Station is located in Porter, on Mineral Springs Road, just north of U.S. 20. It is closed most of the year, except during events. The parking area provides access to the Bailly Homestead and the Chellberg Farm.
- Dunes Learning Center or Indiana Dunes Environmental Learning Center is located on Howe Road, West of the Bailly/Chellberg Contact Station, on the grounds of the former Good Fellow Club Youth Camp. Founded in 1998, Dunes Learning Center is a 501(c)3 non profit environmental education organization working in partnership with Indiana Dunes National Park to deliver environmental education experiences.
- Portage Lakefront and Riverwalk is the newest facility at the national park. It is located along the Burns Waterway, tucked next to U.S. Steel's, Midwest Plant. It can be reached off of Indiana State Road 249 by following the signs past the steel mill. The area offers a fishing pier, a riverwalk, and a hike bike trail through the restored dunescape. There is beach access and a 3,500-square-foot (330 m^{2}) pavilion.
- West Beach Bathhouse is located in Portage north of U.S. Route 12 on County Line Road. West Beach has ample parking, picnic shelters, and a bathhouse with showers. The bathhouse includes changing rooms, restrooms, and a lifeguarded beach. The Dune Succession Trails, West Beach Trail and the Long Lake Trail are all located in the West Beach area.
- Paul H. Douglas Center for Environmental Education is located in the far west end of the park, in the Miller Beach community of the City of Gary. It is just north of U.S. 20 and U.S. 12. The Education Center provides classrooms for programs on environmental topics. Participation is usually during a schedule program for schools and local organizations.

== Gallery ==
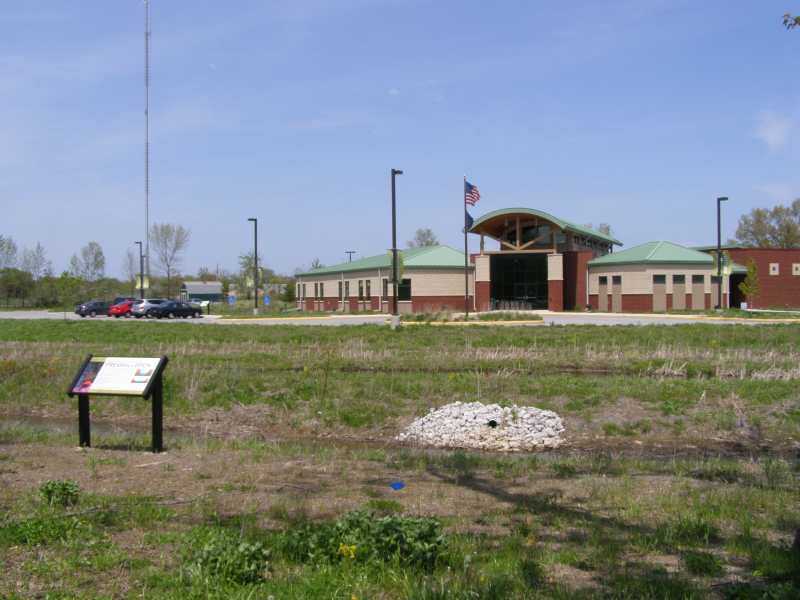
Dorothy Buell Memorial Visitor Center

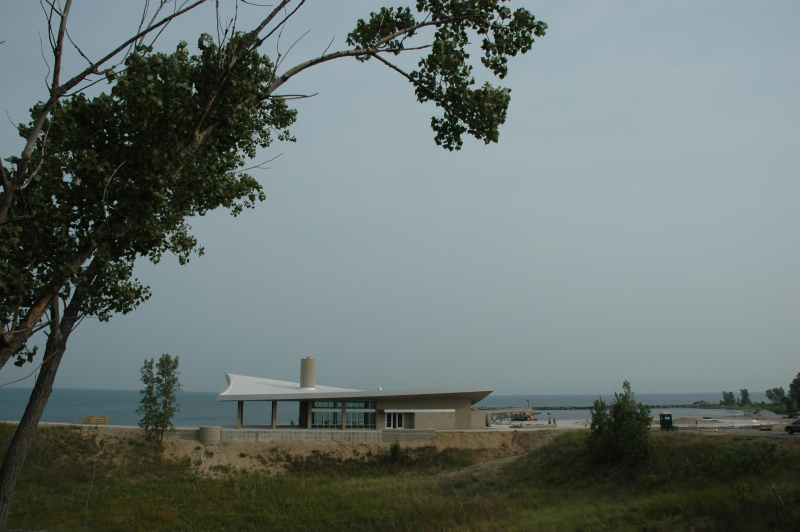
Pavilion at Portage Lakefront and Riverwalk

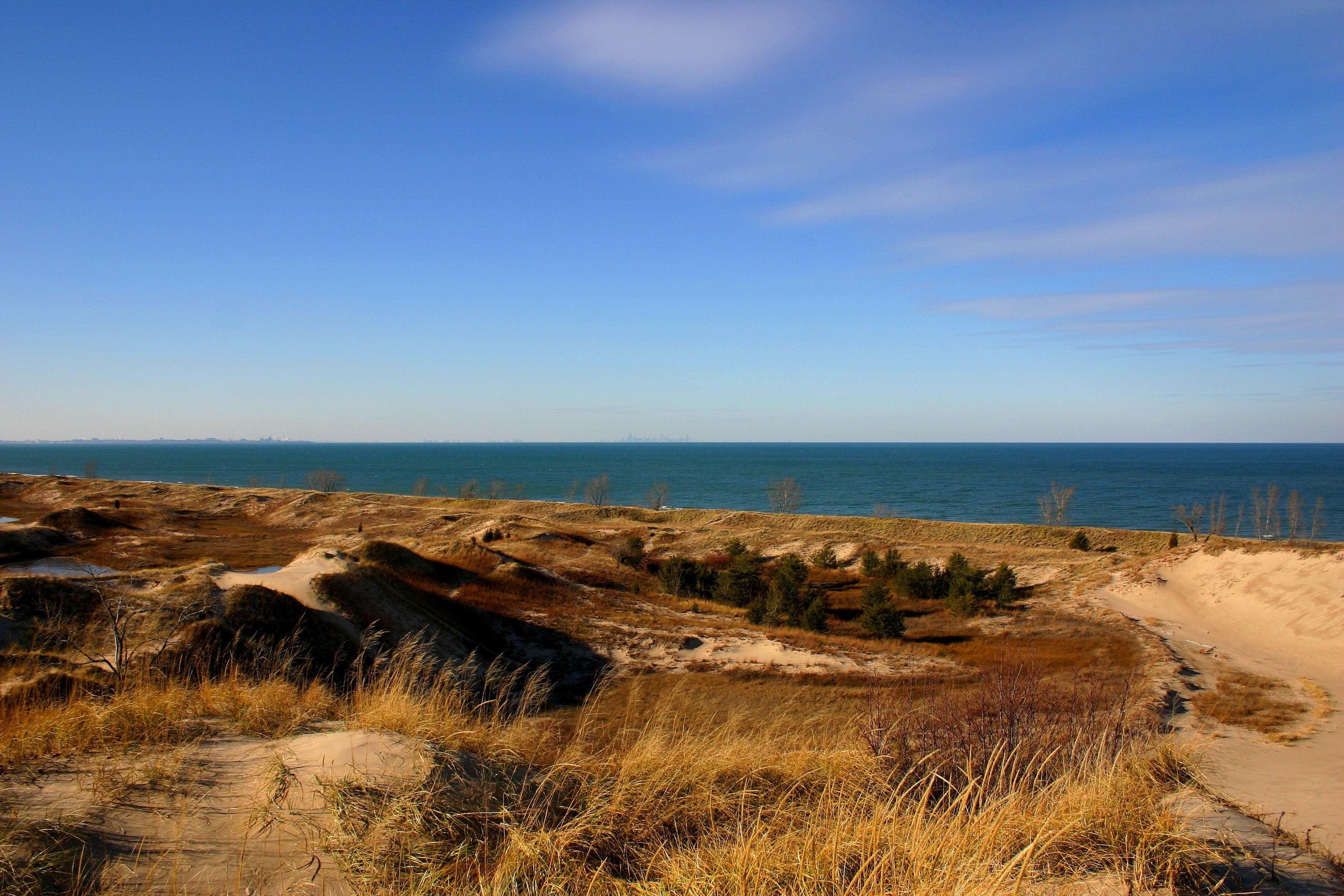
Skyline of Chicago from West Beach

== Dunes National Park Association ==
In 2012, the Dunes National Park Association (DNPA) was established as a nonprofit organization dedicated to supporting the Indiana Dunes National Lakeshore. The DNPA is endorsed by the Indiana Dunes National Lakeshore. The primary purpose of the DNPA is to solicit funds for the direct benefit or support of the lakeshore and related activities, advocate on behalf of the park and educate the community on the abundant resources available in the national park.

== See also ==
- Geography of Indiana
- List of national parks of the United States

Geological forms (North to South)

- Modern Shoreline, Waves and shallow water
- Tolleston Shoreline
- Calumet Shoreline
- Lake Border Moraine
- Glenwood Shoreline
- Tinley Moraine
- Valparaiso Moraine
- Kankakee Outwash Plain

=== People associated with the Dunes ===
- Arts
  - Frank V. Dudley (November 14, 1868 – 1957), artist
  - Jens Jensen, landscape architect (1860–1951)
  - May Theilgaard Watts, Chicago area writer and teacher.
- Geologist
  - George Cressey, wrote his doctoral dissertation on the "A Study of Indiana Sand Dunes".
- Historic
  - Diana of the Dunes, Alice Gray (1881–1925)
- Naturalist
  - Edwin Way Teale, naturalist (1899–1980)
- Preservation
  - Lee Botts
