= List of reptiles of the Indiana Dunes =

Indiana Dunes National Park is a National Park Service unit on the shore of Lake Michigan in Indiana, United States. A BioBlitz took place there on May 15 and 16, 2009. During that time, a list of organisms was compiled which included a preliminary list of the reptiles of the area.

Turtles (Testudinate)

- Chelydra serpentina serpentina - common snapping turtle
- Chrysemys picta marginata - painted turtle
- Emydoidea blandingi - Blanding's turtle
- Pseudemys scripta elegans - cooter
- Sternotherus odoratus - common musk turtle

Lizards (Sauris)

- Cnemidophorus sexlineatus viridis - prairie racerunner
- Plestiodon fasciatus - five-lined skink
- Ophisaurus attenuatus attenuatus - slender glass lizard

Snakes (Serpentes)

- Coluber constrictor flaviventris - eastern racer
- Heterodon platyrhinos - eastern hognose snake
- Lampropeltis triangulum - milk snake
- Nerodia sipedon sipedon - common watersnake
- Storeria dekayi wrightorum - midland brown snake
- Thamnophis proximus - western ribbon snake
- Thamnophis sirtalis - common garter snake
- Thamnophis sirtalis sirtalis - eastern garter snake
- Thamnophis radix radix - eastern plains garter snake
