= Dorothy Richardson Buell =

American educator and nature preservationist (1886–1977)

- Born: 1886; Neenha-Menasha, Wisconsin, U.S.
- Died: May 17, 1977 (aged 90–91); San Jose, California, U.S.
- Education: Lawrence College
- Occupations: Educator, nature preservationist
- Known for: Founded Save the Dunes Council
- Spouse: Hal Buell (m. 1918)
- Children: 1

Dorothy Richardson Buell (1886 – May 17, 1977) was an American educator and nature preservationist who became the founder and first president of the Save the Dunes Council, a nonprofit group dedicated to preserving the Indiana dunelands along Lake Michigan. Buell led a grassroots effort to save the remaining unspoiled dunes in northwestern Indiana from industrial development. Buell's sixteen-year leadership of the Save the Dunes Council, from 1952 to 1968, preserved thousands of acres of dunelands at the Indiana Dunes National Lakeshore, which she helped to establish in 1966 as an urban park as part of the National Park Service.

== Early life and education ==
Dorothy Richardson was born in 1886 and grew up in Neenha-Menasha, Wisconsin, in a large family that included seven children. Although the family's financial resources for a college education were limited, she attended Milwaukee-Downer College for two years before transferring to Lawrence College, graduating with a bachelor of oratory degree in 1911.

== Marriage and family ==
Dorothy Richardson married James "Hal" Buell on June 15, 1918. They had one son, named Robert. Hal Buell's work brought the family to the communities of Gary, Indiana; Tulsa, Oklahoma; Flossmoor, Illinois; and Ogden Dunes, Indiana. Dorothy and Hal Buell lived in Ogden Dunes until 1970, then retired to California.

== Educator and clubwoman ==
Little in her early career indicated that Dorothy Buell would become a leading activist in the Indiana Dunes preservation movement. During her earlier years in Indiana, Buell taught in the Gary public school system and was involved with the settlement house movement at the Gary Neighborhood House. Buell was also active in local women's clubs. As a Republican clubwoman she became known for her wit and theatrical flair.

== Dunes preservationist ==
Buell's interest in preserving the Indiana Dunes stems from a 1949 trip with her husband to White Sands National Monument in New Mexico. When Buell compared New Mexico's dunes to the sand dunes near her Indiana home, she thought the Indiana dunes were more beautiful. After stopping for dinner at the Gary Hotel on the way home from the trip, the Buells saw a poster in the lobby that promoted a meeting that evening of the Indiana Dunes Preservation Council. In a spur-of-the-moment decision, the Buells decided to attend the group's meeting. The gathering inspired Buell to do what she could to help preserve the local dunes. When the preservation council had difficulty getting established, Buell decided to try an organize a new group that was initially included only women.

Earlier preservationists had succeeded in preserving a portion of the local dunes through the establishment of Indiana Dunes State Park in the 1920s, but the dunes preservation movement had been quiet for more than twenty years. By 1949 the two remaining unspoiled sections that comprised about 5 acres (2.0 hectares) of dunes were under heavy scrutiny for further development. Indiana's government and business leaders wanted to develop the dunes area for industrial purposes that included construction of a deep-water port that became known as the Burns Waterway Harbor (Port of Indiana) and opposed the addition of additional lakeshore land to the state park.

== President, Save the Dunes Council ==
Buell reestablished the movement to preserve the natural beauty of the dunes by founding the Save the Dunes Council on June 20, 1952, with a group of twenty to twenty-five women who met at the Buell home. Buell, who served as the first president of the Council, succeeded Bess Sheehan as the leader of a revived dunes preservation movement.

An early victory for Buell and the Council in its first year was the purchase of Cowles Tamarack Bog, a 56-acre (23-hectare) wetlands in Porter County, Indiana, that was sold due to delinquent taxes. Another early development in the revived dunes preservation movement occurred on June 3, 1953, when Howard W. Baker, Region II Director of the National Park Service, attended "A Day in the Dunes." At the Council-sponsored event, Baker spoke publicly in favor of an expanded state park or a potential new national park to preserve the Indiana Dunes.

In Buell's view, the Council's primary goal was to preserve five miles of remaining unspoiled lakeshore by adding it to the Indiana Dunes State Park to protect it from development. She did not want to jeopardize the Council's nonexempt status by getting involved in politics and provoking a confrontation with federal and state government. Instead, Buell preferred to keep the Council's effort focused on educating the public to the need to preserve the dunes. Business and industry leaders, as well as state government officials preferred to seek federal funding to acquire dunelands and develop the area for industrial use. As a result, Indiana's congressional delegation failed to introduce legislation to preserve the lakeshore and have the Indiana Dunes become part of the National Park System.

=== Collaboration with Senator Paul Douglas ===
By 1954 Buell was persuaded that the Council needed to broaden its base of support and become more politically active in order to achieve its goals. She led the Council through its change in strategy, became politically active herself, and headed the Council's national campaign to raise funds and attract new members. For the first time the Council allowed men to become members. By 1956 the Council had grown to include more than a thousand men and women across the United States.

When efforts to gain support from Indiana's congressional delegation proved unsuccessful, Buell turned to other congressional leaders for help. Buell persuaded U.S. Senator Paul Douglas, a Democrat from Illinois, to become involved in the cause to preserve the Indiana Dunes. Buell and Douglas worked together to establish grassroots and political support for the Indiana Dunes National Park, an effort that took nearly a decade amid numerous and significant obstacles. Senator Douglas introduced initial legislation (S. 3898) in the U.S Senate to establish the Indiana Dunes National Monument on May 26, 1958; U.S. Representative John P. Saylor of Pennsylvania introduced a similar bill (H.R. 12689) in the U.S. House of Representatives on the same day.

Buell lead the Council in a nationwide effort to gain citizen support for the proposed legislation that included a nationwide petition drive that had secured 500,000 signatures by 1958; production of a documentary film in support of their cause; and obtaining the support of the national press, conservation groups such as the Izaak Walton League, and federal government officials in the U.S. Department of the Interior's National Park Service. Buell, a skilled orator due to her academic training and involvement in community theater, also testified before the U.S. Senate's Committee on Interior and Insular Affairs on May 13, 1959. She called for a stop to industrial development on lake and seashores. Industrial development and construction of the Burns Waterway Harbor continued while Congress considered the bill and subsequent legislation to establish the national lakeshore.

Senator Douglas, Buell, the Save the Dunes Council, and other dunes supporters eventually succeeded in passage of federal legislation to establish the Indiana Dunes National Lakeshore. By 1966 much of the dunes outside the boundaries of the Indiana Dunes State Park was already under development when a compromise bill passed both houses of Congress in October to appropriate funds to establish a 6,539-acre (2,646-hectare) Indiana Dunes National Lakeshore. (Federal authorization for the construction of the Burns Harbor/Port of Indiana had been secured the previous year.) President Lyndon Johnson signed the bill authorizing the national lakeshore (PL 89-761) in November 1966. The acquisition costs to establish the new national lakeshore park was about $28 million.

== Later years ==
Buell served as its president of Save the Dunes Council for sixteen years; however, by the mid-1960s she had delegated much of the work to others. Buell stepped down as president in 1968. Sylvia Troy succeeded Buell as president.

The Burns Waterway Harbor (Port of Indiana) opened in 1970, the same year that Buell and her husband retired to California. The Indiana Dunes National Lakeshore, which Buell spent two decades trying to establish, was formally dedicated on September 8, 1972. Buell returned to Indiana to deliver one of the speeches at the lakeshore's dedication ceremony. Although reduced in size and a patchwork of noncontiguous property surrounded by heavy industrial and commercial development at Lake Michigan, the Indiana Dunes National Lakeshore became the National Park System's first urban park.

== Death and legacy ==
Buell died on May 17, 1977, aged 90, at a hospital in San Jose. She is remembered as a tenacious, dignified, and reserved activist whose tireless efforts overcame significant challenges in achieving the goal of preserving the Indiana Dunes. Buell was also known for her passion, enthusiasm, wit, and tireless energy. Although she lacked organization skills, Buell inspired others to join her cause.

Buell's most significant contribution to preserving northwest Indiana's sand dunes was her efforts to establish of the Indiana Dunes National Park in 1966. As the founder and sixteen-year president of the Save the Dunes Council, Buell was the local leader of the movement to save the remaining unspoiled areas of the Indiana Dunes from industrial development. Buell's and the Council's efforts helped to preserve thousands of acres of northern Indiana dunelands as part of the National Park Service.

== Honors and tributes ==
- The Indiana Dunes National Park's visitor center was named in her honor in 1992.
- The Save the Dune Council's Presidents Fund, established in honor of Buell and Troy, its first and second presidents, uses donations to purchase land for the Indiana Dunes National Park.
