= List of invasive plant species in the Indiana Dunes =

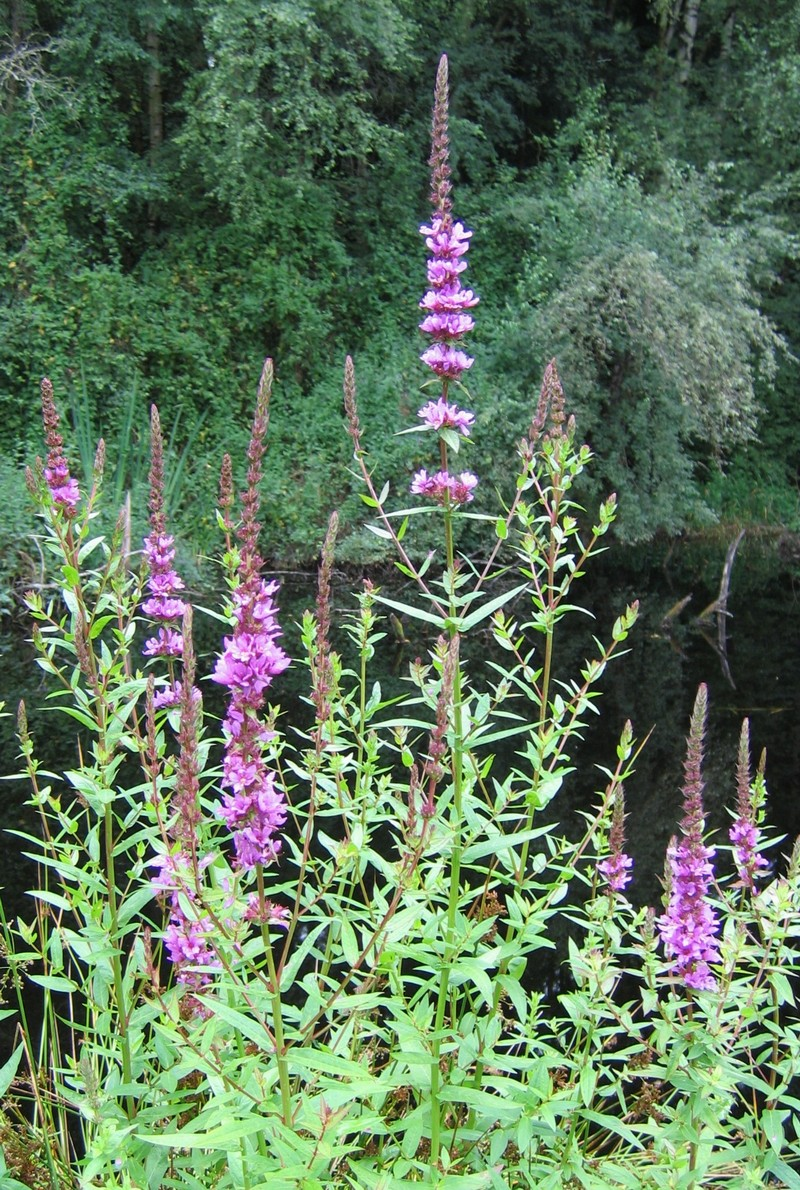
Purple loosestrife, Lythrum salicaria

The Indiana Dunes is an area of land beside Lake Michigan, in the State of Indiana, United States. It includes Indiana Dunes National Park and Indiana Dunes State Park. Non-native plant species, specifically invasive species, have colonized that area. Invasive plants are those plants that aggressively spread throughout an area and out-compete other plant species, normally those that are native to the area.

== Negative impacts ==
Invasive plant species in the Indiana Dunes have several negative impacts. They may:

- Displace the variety of flowering plants, substituting a monoculture
- Grow densely around trails, roads, and water, making travel difficult or impossible
- Introduce toxins into the environment
- Have unpleasant spines or thorns
- Smother ponds, killing fish

Specific examples include:

- Purple loosestrife – establishes a monoculture, reducing the variety of wildlife.
- Bush honeysuckles – prevents regeneration of woody plants and herbs, reducing bird habitat.
- Glossy buckthorn – prevents regeneration of woody plants, slowly destroying forests.
- Garlic mustard – alters the chemistry of the soil to kill other seeds, creating a monoculture.
- Asian bittersweet – this vine can kill or damage trees and shrubs.
- Crown vetch – alters the soil chemistry and pushes out the variety of other plants.
- Japanese knotweed – tolerates floods and drought, creates a monoculture.
- Spotted knapweed – releases toxins into the soil to poison its competition.
- Common reed – this introduced non-native species aggressively pushes the native species and other aquatic plants out of the ecosystem.
- Canada thistle – out-competes native vegetation in prairies, savannas, and dunes.

== Species established within the Dunes ==
Current threats

- Acer platanoides - Norway maple
- Ailanthus altissima - tree of heaven
- Alliaria petiolata - garlic mustard
- Artemisia vulgaris - mugwort
- Berberis thunbergii - Japanese barberry
- Celastrus orbiculatus - Oriental bittersweet
- Centaurea maculosa - spotted knapweed
- Cirsium arvense - Canada thistle
- Cirsium vulgare - bull thistle
- Elaeagnus angustifolia - Russian olive
- Elaeagnus umbellata - autumn olive
- Euonymus atropurpureus - burning bush
- Helianthus petiolaris - petioled sunflower
- Hesperis matronalis - dame's rocket
- Holcus lanatus - Yorkshire Fog, velvet grass
- Leymus arenarius - lyme grass
- Lonicera tatarica - Tartarian honeysuckle
- Lonicera hybrids - Hybrid honeysuckles
- Lonicera japonica - Japanese honeysuckle
- Lonicera maackii - Amur honeysuckle
- Lysimachia nummularia - moneywort
- Lythrum salicaria - purple loosestrife
- Melilotus officinalis - yellow sweet clover
- Phalaris arundinacea - reed canary grass
- Phragmites australis - common reed, phragmites
- Reynoutria japonica (syn. Polygonum cuspidatum) - Japanese knotweed
- Rhamnus cathartica - common buckthorn
- Rhamnus frangula - glossy buckthorn
- Robinia pseudoacacia - black locust
- Rosa multiflora - multiflora rose
- Typha angustifolia - narrow-leaved cattail
- Typha × glauca - hybrid cattail

Emerging threats to natural resources or extent unknown

- Alnus glutinosa - European alder
- Carduus nutans - musk thistle
- Coronilla varia - crown vetch
- Cynoglossum officinale - houndstongue
- Dipsacus sylvestris - common teasel
- Euphorbia cyparissias - cypress spurge
- Euphorbia esula - leafy spurge
- Gypsophila paniculata - common baby's breath
- Humulus japonicus - Japanese hops
- Iris pseudacorus - yellow iris
- Leonurus cardiaca - motherwort
- Ligustrum vulgare - common privet
- Morus alba - white mulberry
- Myriophyllum spicatum - Eurasian watermilfoil
- Pinus sylvestris - Scots pine
- Populus alba - white poplar
- Populus nigra - Lombardy poplar
- Robinia hispida - bristly locust
- Saponaria officinalis - bouncing bet
- Ulmus pumila - Siberian elm
- Vinca minor - periwinkle
- Viburnum opulus var. opulus - European cranberry bush
