= List of fishes of the Indiana Dunes =

Indiana Dunes National Park is a National Park Service unit on the shore of Lake Michigan in Indiana, United States. A BioBlitz took place there on May 15 and 16, 2009. During that time, a list of organisms was compiled which included a preliminary listing of the (freshwater) fish of the area.

== List of fish species ==
Herring

- Alosa pseudoharengus - alewife (an invasive species)

Pickerel

- Esox americanus - American pickerel

Darters

- Etheostoma exile - Iowa darter

Sunfish

- Chaenobryttus gulosus - warmouth
- Lepomis cyanellus - green sunfish
- Lepomis gibbosus - pumpkinseed

Bass

- Micropterus salmoides - largemouth bass

Goby

- Neogobius melanostomus - round goby

Shiners

- Cyprinella spiloptera - spotfin shiner
- Notemigonus crysoleucas - golden shiner
- Notropis atherinoides - emerald shiner
- Notropis hudsonius - spottail shiner
- Notropis stramineus - sand shiner
- Notropis volucellus - mimic shiner

Salmon

- Oncorhynchus kisutch - coho salmon
- Oncorhynchus mykiss - rainbow trout
- Oncorhynchus tshawytscha - Chinook salmon

Minnow

- Umbra limi - central mudminnow

== Fishing areas ==
- Portage Lakefront and Riverwalk. In 2009 a fishing pier was erected along the breakwall for the Burns Waterway entry. This area has been noted for small mouth bass, carp, catfish, salmon, and trout.
- Long Lake is accessed through the West Beach entrance on Lake and Porter County Line Road. It is known for large mouth bass and bluegill.
- Salt Creek is at the junction of the east branch of the Little Calumet River. It is difficult to get to in Burns Harbor, but this area has produced large mouth bass, salmon, and trout.
