= Save the Dunes =

US nonprofit organization

- Formation: June 1952
- Founder: Dorothy Richardson Buell
- Headquarters: Northwest Indiana
- Services: Protect and advocate for the Indiana Dunes, Lake Michigan, and the surrounding area
- Website: savedunes.org

Save the Dunes Conservation Fund, originally known as Save the Dunes Council, is a 501(c)(3) nonprofit organization in Northwest Indiana whose mission is to protect and advocate for the Indiana Dunes, Lake Michigan, and the surrounding natural areas for the health and vitality of the environment and the people who live, work, and recreate in Northwest Indiana. Watershed.

== History ==
The Save the Dunes council was established in June 1952 by Dorothy Richardson Buell when 21 women met at her home to create what became the campaign to establish the Indiana Dunes National Lakeshore. Their credo was, "We are prepared to spend the rest of our lives, if necessary, to save the Dunes". Indiana Representative Charles A. Halleck aggressively challenged the council and their ally, Illinois Senator, Paul Douglas. Halleck carried an unwavering support for creating a port on the Lakeshore which would have removed the large central dunes of the Indiana Dunes. The battle between Douglas and Halleck ended in compromise, with the Port of Indiana being created and the authorization of the Indiana Dunes National Lakeshore.

As a result of the more than century-long advocacy effort, on February 15, 2019, the Indiana Dunes National Lakeshore became the Indiana Dunes National Park—the first national park in Indiana, and the country's 61st. Save the Dunes is an official partner of the Indiana Dunes National Park.

In partnership with Hitchcock Design Group, Save the Dunes published Living in the Dunes, a homeowner's guide to landscaping in the Dunes, to help landowners protect their parts of the landscape. It won a 2018 Honor Award from the American Society for Landscape Architects.

The organization also participates in the Monarch Music Fest.

== See also ==
- List of environmental and conservation organizations in the United States
- Irene Herlocker-Meyer
