= List of crustaceans of the Indiana Dunes =

Indiana Dunes National Park is a National Park Service unit on the shore of Lake Michigan in Indiana, United States. A BioBlitz took place there on May 15 and 16, 2009. A first attempt was made to create a list of crustaceans present in the Lakeshore area. Further research is required to document all that may be present.

== Branchiopoda ==
Cladocera, water fleas

1. Alona costata
2. Bosmina longirostris
3. Ceriadaphnia reticulata
4. Daphnia laevis
5. Macrothrix rosea
6. Alonella, Family Chydoridae
7. Ceriodaphnia, Family Daphniidae
8. Daphnia, Family Daphniidae

== Maxillopoda ==
Copepods

1. Canthocamptus assimilis
2. Diaptomus leptapus
3. Eucyclops agilis
4. Thermocyclops dybowskii
5. Paracyclops fimbriatus
6. nauplii

== Ostracoda ==
1. Notodromas monacha

== Malacostraca ==
1. Isopoda, woodlice and/or pill bug species
  1. Porcellio scaber, woodlouse
2. Orconectes immunis, crayfish
