= List of arachnids of the Indiana Dunes =

Indiana Dunes National Park is a National Park Service unit on the shore of Lake Michigan in Indiana, United States. A BioBlitz took place there on May 15 and 16, 2009. During that time, a list of organisms was compiled which included a preliminary listing of the arachnids of the area.

== List of arachnid species ==
Acari

1. Ixodes dammini - deer tick

Spiders: Araneae

1. Dysdera crocata - woodlouse spider
2. Leiobunum vittatum - harvestman
3. Pardosa - wolf spider
4. Pholcidae - granddaddy long-legs spider, daddy long-legs spider, daddy long-legger, cellar spider, vibrating spider, or house spider
5. Pisauridae - nursery web spider
6. Salticidae - jumping spider
7. Sparassidae - huntsman spider or giant crab spider
8. Tetragnathidae - long-jawed orb weaver
9. Theridiidae - tangle web spider
