= Mount Baldy (sand dune) =

Sand dune in Indiana, United States

- Sand dune
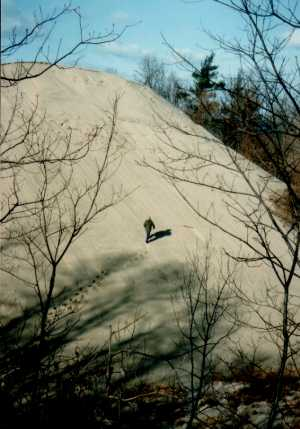
- View of the dune

- Location of Mount Baldy in Indiana
- Coordinates: 41°42′32″N 86°55′41″W
- Range: 41°42'33"N 86°55'47"W
- Age: Holocene
- Elevation: 38 m (126 ft)

Mount Baldy is a sand dune located in Indiana Dunes National Park in Indiana, USA. It is on the southern shore of Lake Michigan and is 126 feet (38 m) tall. It is a wandering dune that moves or shifts every year, and is called a "living dune."

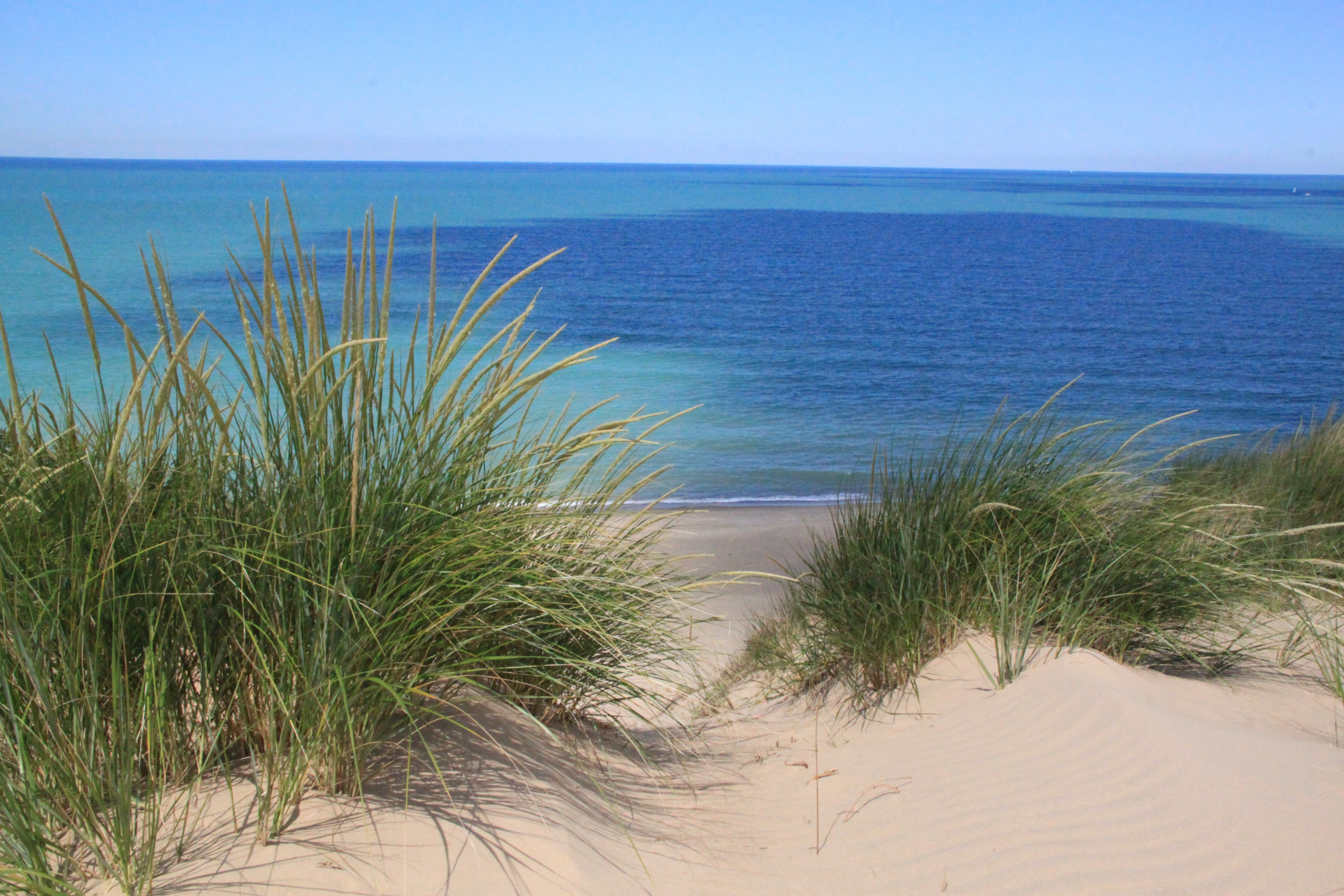
A view of Lake Michigan from Mount Baldy.

Mount Baldy is accessible from U.S. Route 12 (also known as Dunes Highway) between the town of Pines and the western border of Michigan City, Indiana. It is a tourist attraction locally and regionally, drawing weekend and summer visitors from Chicago. Prior to the dune's closure, one could ascend its 302 steps and see Chicago's skyline. North of Mount Baldy is a swimmable beach which is also part of Indiana Dunes National Park.

== Erosion ==
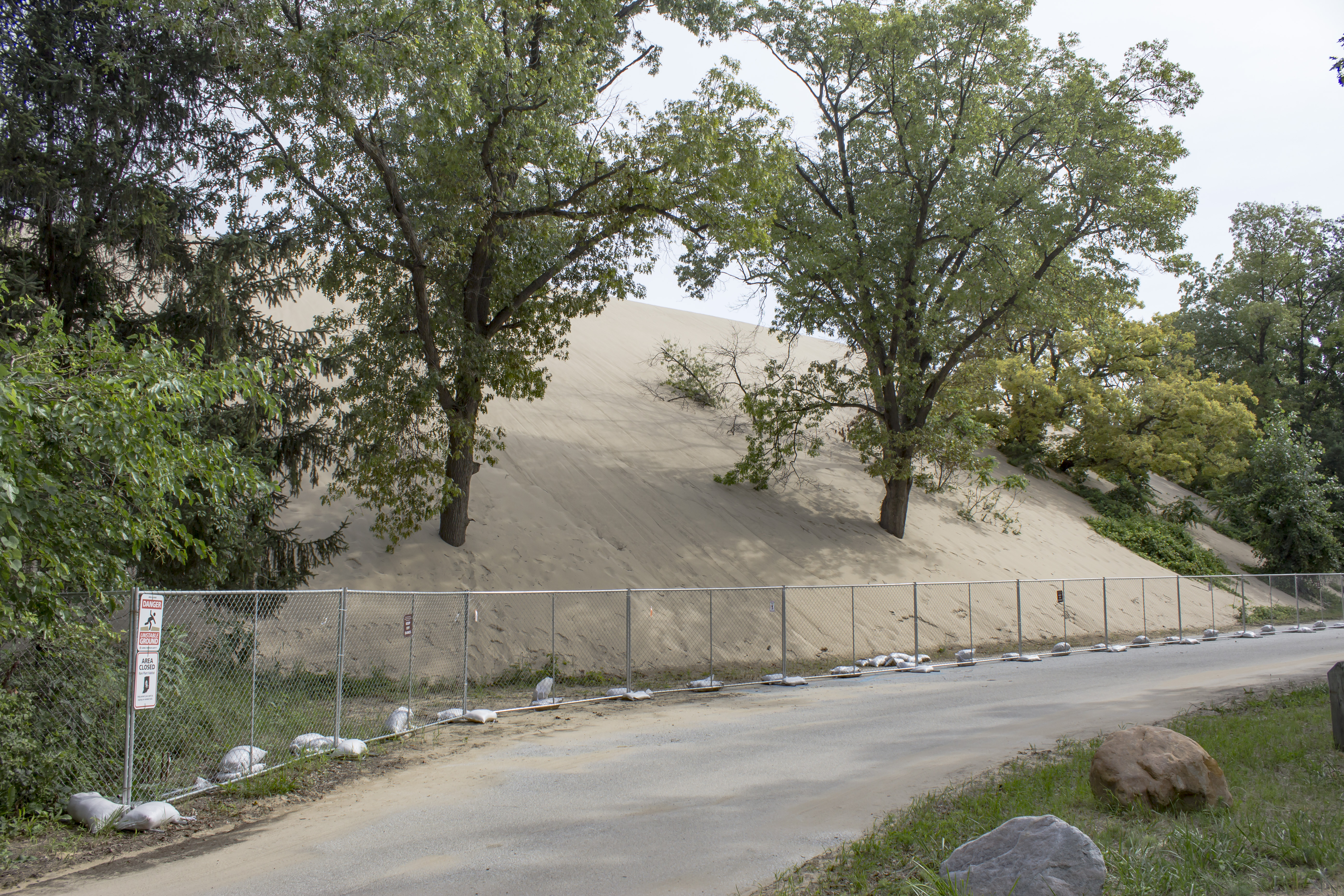

Due to the popularity with visitors climbing up the dune, the marram grass which had stabilized it was largely destroyed, and the dune has begun advancing southwards, threatening to overrun its parking lot. Accordingly, the National Park Service has rerouted trails and planted grass in hopes of slowing the dune. Visitors are no longer allowed to climb up the southern side of the dune.

The piers from nearby Michigan City, Indiana, intensify erosion by blocking the natural sediment flow produced by longshore drift in Lake Michigan.

== Decomposition chimney ==
In 2013, a void space anomaly in the dune led to a small child falling into a cylindrical shaft that collapsed and buried the child. It took three hours for the boy to be rescued from the 11-foot (3.4 m) pit. The geological process that produced the never-before-studied anomalies appears to be related to the burial and decomposition of fungus-ridden black oak trees. In 2016, scientists concluded that such anomalies in the moving or living dune are caused by the burial of trees that eventually decay, leaving a hollowed-out shaft beneath unsteady ground, named a "dune decomposition chimney". The majority of the dune remains closed to visitors except on ranger-led tours; however, the beach reopened in the summer of 2017.
