= Midwest Rail Rangers =

US non-profit organization

- Midwest Rail Rangers Logo
- Formation: July 20, 2015
- Type: Non-Profit 501(c)(3)
- Legal status: Active
- Headquarters: Luck, Wisconsin
- Location: P.O. Box 615, Luck, WI 54853
- Region served: Midwestern United States
- Services: Passenger rail interpretive programs
- President: Robert Tabern
- Secretary: Mike Pace
- Treasurer: Amanda Anderson
- Affiliations: South Shore Line, Indiana Dunes National Park, Indiana Dunes State Park
- Volunteers: 8
- Website: http://www.RailRangers.org
- Formerly called: APRHF Rail Rangers, Trails & Rails

Midwest Rail Rangers is a non-profit organization specializing with on-board educational programs to railroad passengers in the Midwestern United States with information regarding history, ecology, and geology.

Guides with Midwest Rail Rangers provide interpretive programs on-board the South Shore Line between Chicago, Illinois and South Bend, Indiana.

The organization is based in Luck, Wisconsin.

== History ==
The Midwest Rail Rangers was officially chartered on July 20, 2015. The organization is modeled after Trails & Rails, a formal partnership between Amtrak and the National Park Service.

In 1999, The National Park Service established the Trails & Rails program. Docents associated with the park service travel aboard select Amtrak long-distance passenger trains to provide educational commentary. Docents would point out interesting landmarks along the way to passengers, including the history of various towns the train was passing through, ecology, and geology of the landscape. A Chicago-based Trails & Rails program was established in 2000. The Illinois & Michigan Canal National Heritage Corridor sponsored a Trails & Rails program on Amtrak's Texas Eagle between Chicago and Saint Louis, Missouri that ran through 2004. The following year, Trails & Rails decided to move volunteers to the Empire Builder Between 2005 and 2010, volunteers presented programs in the lounge car between Chicago Union Station and either Winona, Minnesota or St. Paul, Minnesota. In September 2010, Trails & Rails ended all Chicago based programs.

In late 2012, the American Passenger Rail Heritage Foundation (APRHF), a 501(c)(3) non-profit rail history organization, approached Amtrak and the National Park Service about establishing a new Trails & Rails program on the Southwest Chief between Chicago and La Plata, Missouri. Since there were no National Park Service units along the route at the time, it was agreed that the APRHF would manage the day-to-day operations of the program, with additional oversight provided by Trails & Rails National Coordinator James Miculka, who was based in College Station, Texas. A group of 30 Chicago-based Trails & Rails volunteers were chosen, and the first program took place on May 18, 2013. During its two-and-a-half year run, the APRHF-sponsored Trails & Rails program through Illinois, Iowa, and Missouri reached out to over 50,000 Amtrak passengers, with more than 200 programs given. In June 2015, Trails & Rails National Coordinator Jim Miculka informed the APRHF Board of Directors that he wished the end the partnership agreement. The final Trails & Rails program on the Southwest Chief between Chicago and La Plata took place on July 19, 2015.

After the elimination of Trails & Rails program on the Southwest Chief, the American Passenger Rail Heritage Foundation announced the creation of the APRHF Rail Rangers. Trails & Rails holds an exclusive agreement to provide narration services on Amtrak trains, the APRHF Rail Rangers decided to focus its efforts on providing interpretive programs on non-Amtrak passenger trains, group charters, and at railroad museums. The name Rail Rangers pays homage to the organization's roots with Trails & Rails, as Rail Rangers was slated to be the original name of Trails & Rails before a last-minute change by Amtrak.

In December 2018, it was announced that the Rail Rangers would be splitting off from the APRHF in order to form an independent 501(c)(3) non-profit organization. The name was officially changed to the Midwest Rail Rangers on December 14, 2018. On-board educational programs on both the South Shore Line and private rail excursions continue to operate.

== South Shore Line ==
Midwest Rail Rangers provides on-board educational programs on select departures of the South Shore Line between Chicago's Millennium Station and South Bend International Airport station. Programs feature live narration in a designated car, free route guide sheets, route guidebooks (for purchase), and a junior ranger program for kids and teens aboard. Programs takes place on various train departures year-round.

In partnership with the Northern Indiana Commuter Transportation District, the Midwest Rail Rangers have published a 120-page route guidebook for the South Shore Line.
