= Mammals of the Indiana Dunes =

Coordinates: 41.648056°N 87.108056°W

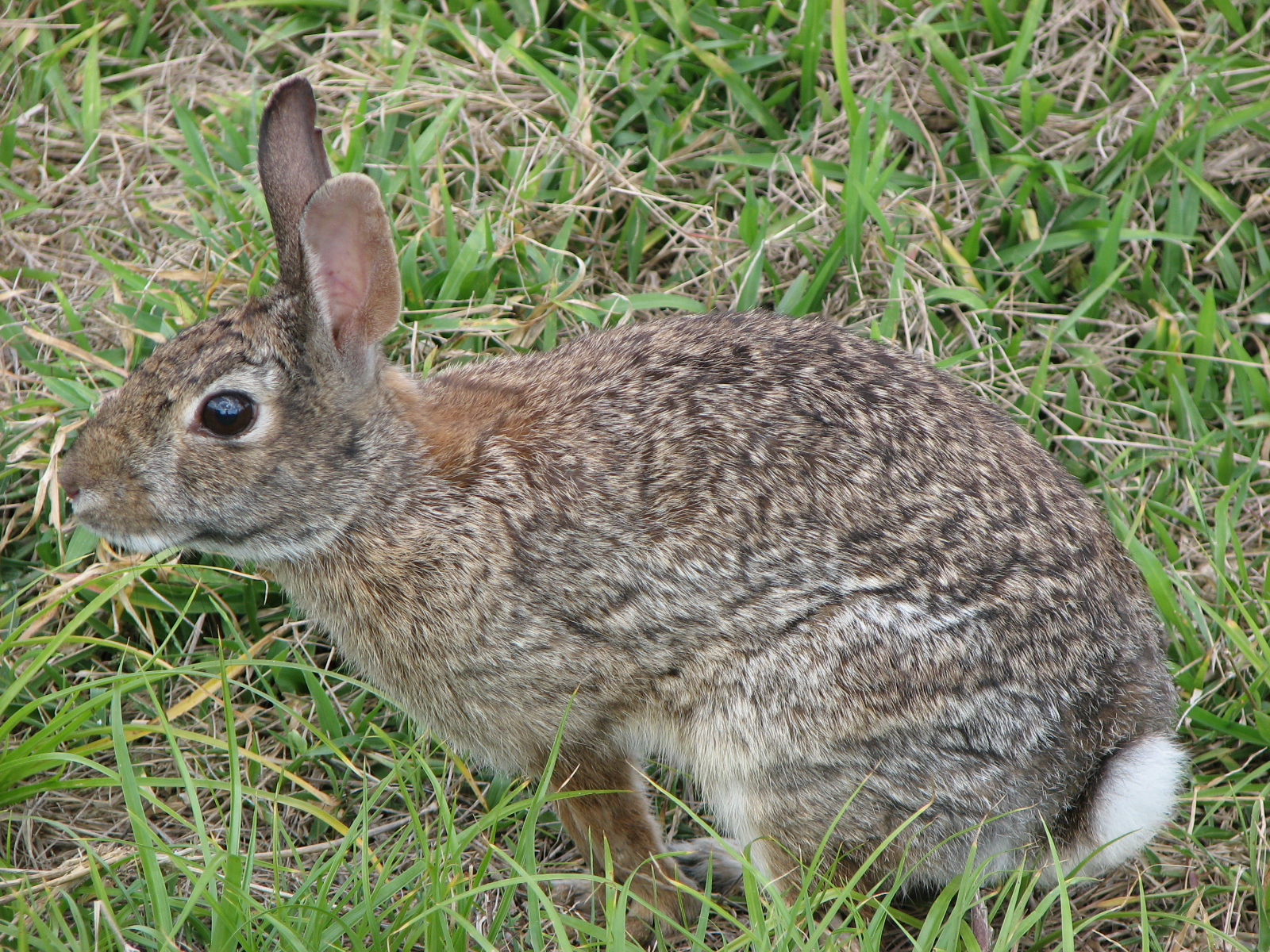
Cottontail

Thirty-seven species of mammals have been identified at Indiana Dunes National Park. Four other species are thought to inhabit the park, but have not been documented: the northern long-eared myotis (Myotis septentrionalis), the Indiana bat (Myotis sodalis), the hoary bat (Lasiurus cinereus), and the southern bog lemming (Synaptomys cooperi)

Common mammals seen by visitors and residents include the eastern cottontail, the eastern fox squirrel, the white-footed mouse, the white-tailed deer, and the meadow vole. Extirpated mammals include the common porcupine (Erethizon dorsatum), the Eastern wolf (Canis lycaon), the red wolf (Canis rufus), the black bear (Ursus americanus), the fisher (Pekania pennanti), the cougar (Puma concolor), the Canada lynx (Lynx canadensis), the bobcat (Lynx rufus), the elk (Cervus canadensis), and the American bison (Bison bison). There are two threatened or endangered species in the dunes. The American badger (Taxidea taxus), on the Indiana threatened list is known to inhabit the area. The Indiana bat (Myotis indiana), on the federal endangered list is presumed to inhabit areas of the dunes. Recent records, documented photographically, indicate that North American river otter (Lontra canadensis) and bobcat (Lynx rufus) began returning to the area in 2011 and 2018, respectively.

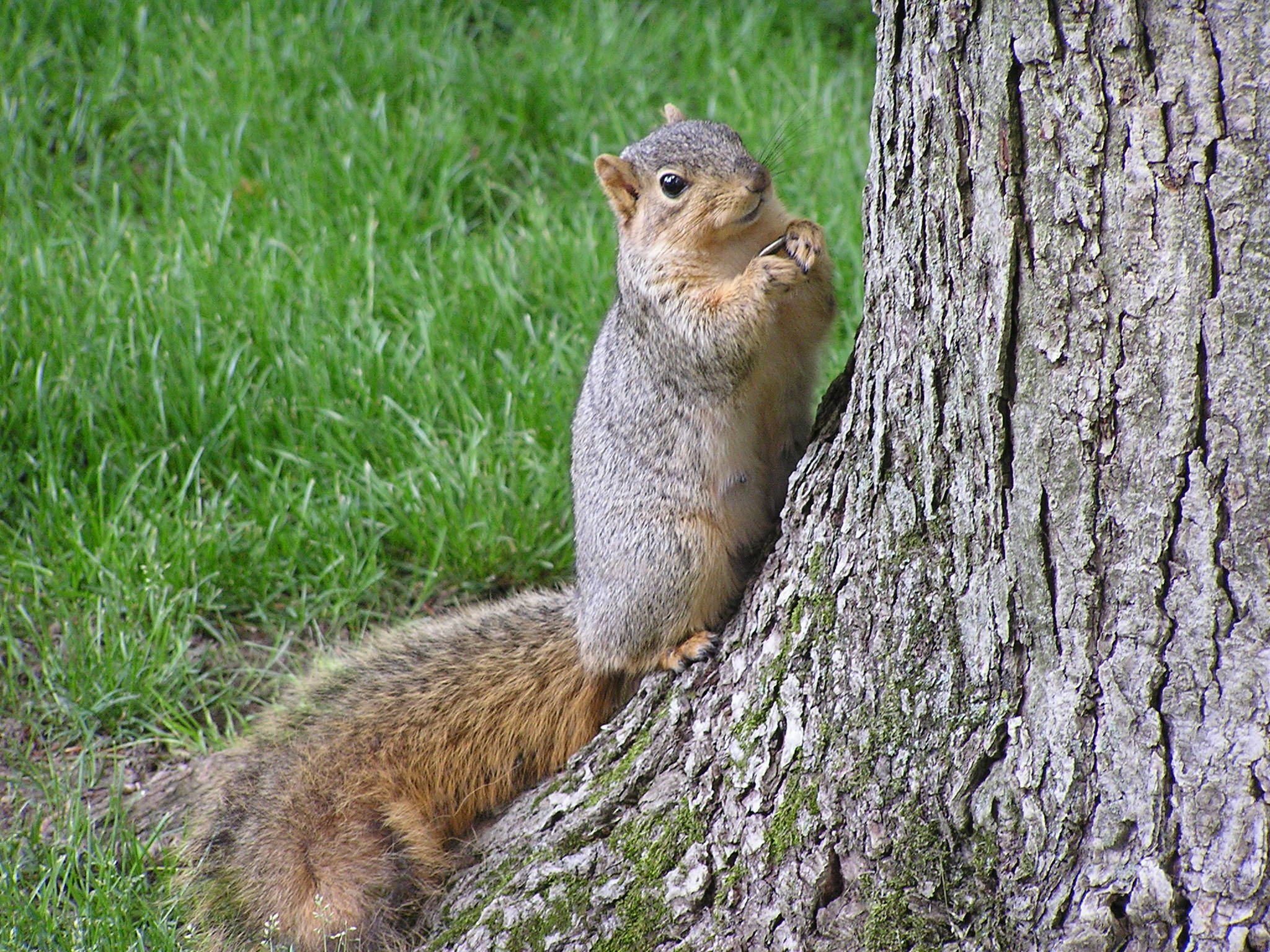
Fox squirrel (Sciurus niger)

== List of mammals documented in the Dunes ==
	Common name	Latin Name	Locations
1	Marsupial	(Order Didelphimorphia)	
	Virginia opossum	Didelphis virginiana	Miller Woods, Dune Park, and Portage Lakefront
5	Insectivores	Order Insectivora	
	Masked shrew	Sorex cinereus	Miller Woods and Portage Lakefront
	Northern short-tailed shrew	Blarina brevicauda	
	Least shrew	Cryptotis parva	
	Eastern mole	Scalopus aquaticus	Millerwoods, and Portage Lakefront
	short-tailed shrew	Blarina brevicauda	interdunal ponds, the pines, and Portage Lakefront
5	Bats	Order Chiroptera	
	Little brown bat	Myotis lucifugus	Portage Lakefront
	Eastern red bat	Lasiurus borealis	
	Silver-haired bat	Lasionycteris noctivagans	
	Big brown bat	Eptesicus fuscus	
	Red bat	Nycteris borealis	
1	Lagomorphs	Order Lagomorpha	
	Eastern cottontail	Sylvilagus floridanus	Millerwoods and Portage Lakefront
18	Rodents	Order Rodentia	
	Eastern chipmunk	Tamias striatus	
	Woodchuck	Marmota monax	
	Thirteen-lined ground squirrel	Spermophilus tridecemlineatus	Millerwoods and Portage Lakefront
	Eastern gray squirrel	Sciurus carolinensis	Millerwoods and Portage Lakefront
	Eastern fox squirrel	Sciurus niger	Millerwoods and Portage Lakefront
	American red squirrel	Tamiasciurus hudsonicus	Millerwoods and Portage Lakefront
	Southern flying squirrel	Glaucomys volans	
	American beaver	Castor canadensis	
	White-footed mouse	Peromyscus leucopus	Millerwoods and Portage Lakefront
	Northern deer mouse	Peromyscus leucopus noveboracenis	
	Prairie deer mouse	Peromyscus maniculatus bairdii	Portage Lakefront
	Brown rat	Rattus norvegicus	
	House mouse	Mus musculus	
	Prairie vole	Microtus ochrogaster	
	Meadow vole	Microtus pennsylvanicus	Millerwoods and Portage Lakefront
	Woodland vole	Microtus pinetorum	Portage Lakefront
	Common muskrat	Ondatra zibethicus	Millerwoods and Portage Lakefront
	Meadow jumping mouse	Zapus hudsonius	
9	Carnivores	Order Carnivora	
	Bobcat	Lynx rufus	
	North American river otter	Lontra Canadensis	
	Coyote	Canis latrans	
	Red fox	Vulpes vulpes	Dunes
	Common gray fox	Urocyon cinereoargenteus	
	Common raccoon	Procyon lotor	dunes, Millerwoods, and Portage Lakefront
	Long-tailed weasel	Neogale frenata	Portage Lakefront
	Least weasel	Mustela nivalis	
	American mink	Neogale vison	near water, and Portage Lakefront
	American badger	Taxidea taxus	
	Striped skunk	Mephitis mephitis	Portage Lakefront
1	Artiodactyls	Order Artiodactyla	
	White-tailed deer	Odocoileus virginianus	Millerwoods and Portage Lakefront

== Habitats ==
While this article breaks out mammal communities by habitats, one of the problems you'll encounter in the Dunes community is that the habitats are in flux. Razed Residential areas are slowly returning to the habitat of the surrounding area, whether that is a wetland hummock, or a savanna. At Mount Baldy forested areas are becoming open sand. While the process may take years, an area that once hosted a community of plants and animals may change in your lifetime.

== Barren ground ==
Barren ground consists of open sand on the beaches and blowouts. Barren grounds are about 4% of the dunes areas and occur mostly along the beaches. Because of the scarcity of plants there are no permanent mammals living in the area. The normal process is for animals to hunt on the beach at night. Some animals will live in the scattered clumps of plants that may remain or return to the blowouts. Evidence of animals in the barren areas is usually done through their tracks. Animals appear to go to the beach to feed and/or drink. In the blowouts, evidence of mammals is found near the clumps of grass (marrain grass and sea rocket).

Species found
Beaches: Virginia opossum, raccoon, and prairie deer mice and white-tailed deer. Blowouts: masked shrew, prairie vole, and meadow voles.

== Prairie ==
About 4.4% of the area of the dunes is prairie. Three-fourths of that is dry prairie, the remainder is wet prairie.

=== Dry prairie ===
Dry prairie primarily is along the front of dunes. It is easily identified by open sand with stands of marram grass and sand reed. The increased plant life over the barren sand provides shelter for small mammals. Little bluestem grass may be mixed in or it may form dense clumps among the dunes. The plots with little bluestem grass often had a greater variety of plant species, especially when away from the lakeshore.

Species found

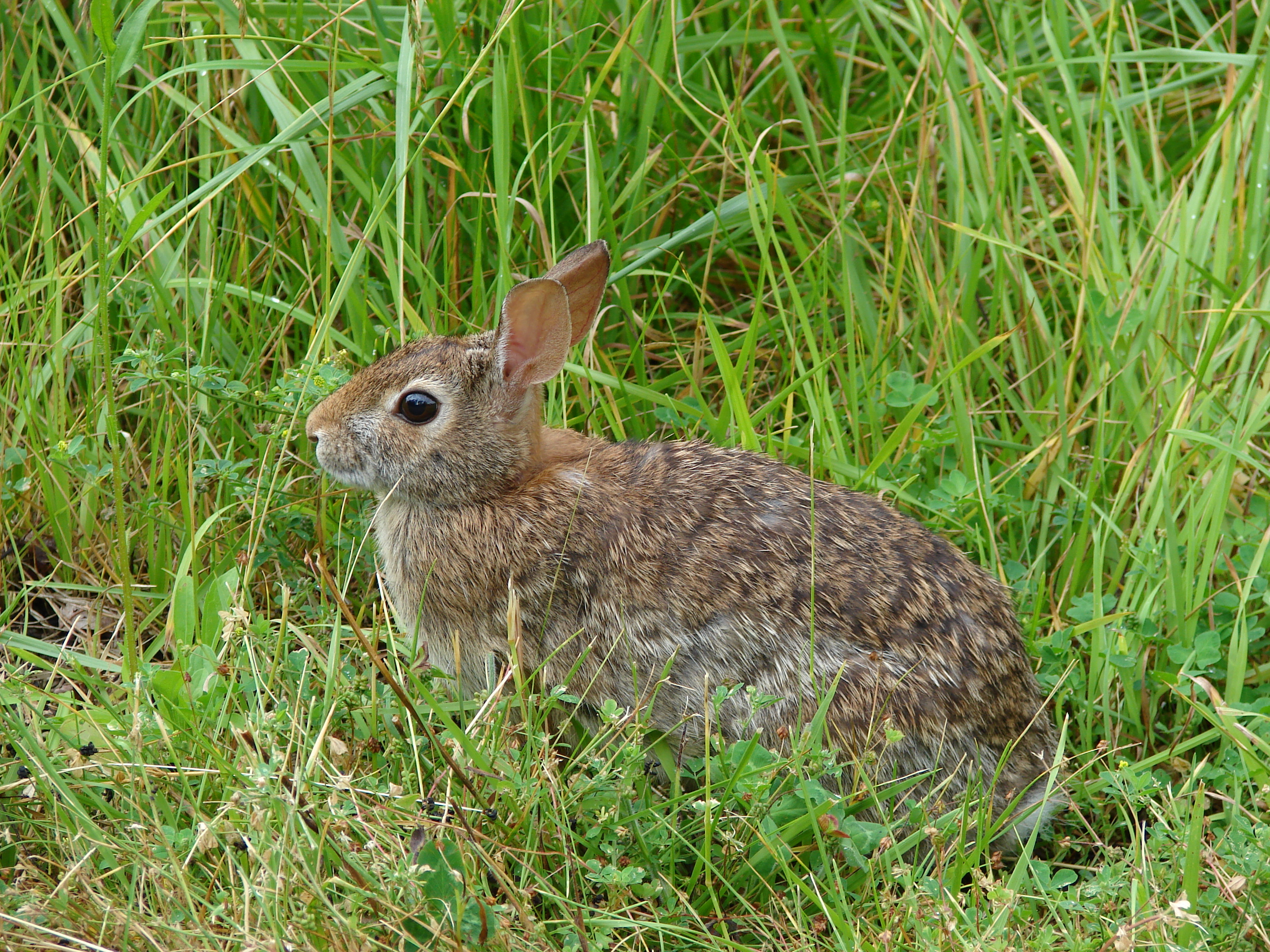
Eastern cottontail

- Marram grass, sand reed, little bluesteam dominated prairie:

Prairie deer mice, white-footed mice, meadow voles, thirteen-lined ground squirrels, northern short-tailed shrews, and eastern cottontails. The prairie mice are the only small mammal that increase in numbers with less plant cover. Voles thrive only with good plant cover. When short-tailed shrews use dry prairies only where they abut wetter areas.

- Marram grass, and sand reed only prairie:

Prairie deer mice, white-footed mice, prairie voles, ground squirrels, eastern cottontails, and northern short-tailed shrew.

- Little bluestem grass dominant areas

Prairie deer mice, white-footed mice, northern short-tailed shrews, thirteen-lined ground squirrels, and eastern cottontail.

Signs found
eastern cottontail, the red fox, white-tailed deer, domestic dog and the long-tailed weasel. Sign have been seen that may be the southern bog lemming, but no animal itself has been found to confirm its presence. The bog lemming stays pretty much in bogs or wet areas. It does have a broad range of habitats around wetland areas. The thirteen-lined ground squirrel stays mostly in mowed areas, i.e., lawns, pastures, and roadsides. There discovery may indicate that they lived in the dry prairie before settlement created artificially maintained (mowed) spaces.

=== Wet prairie ===
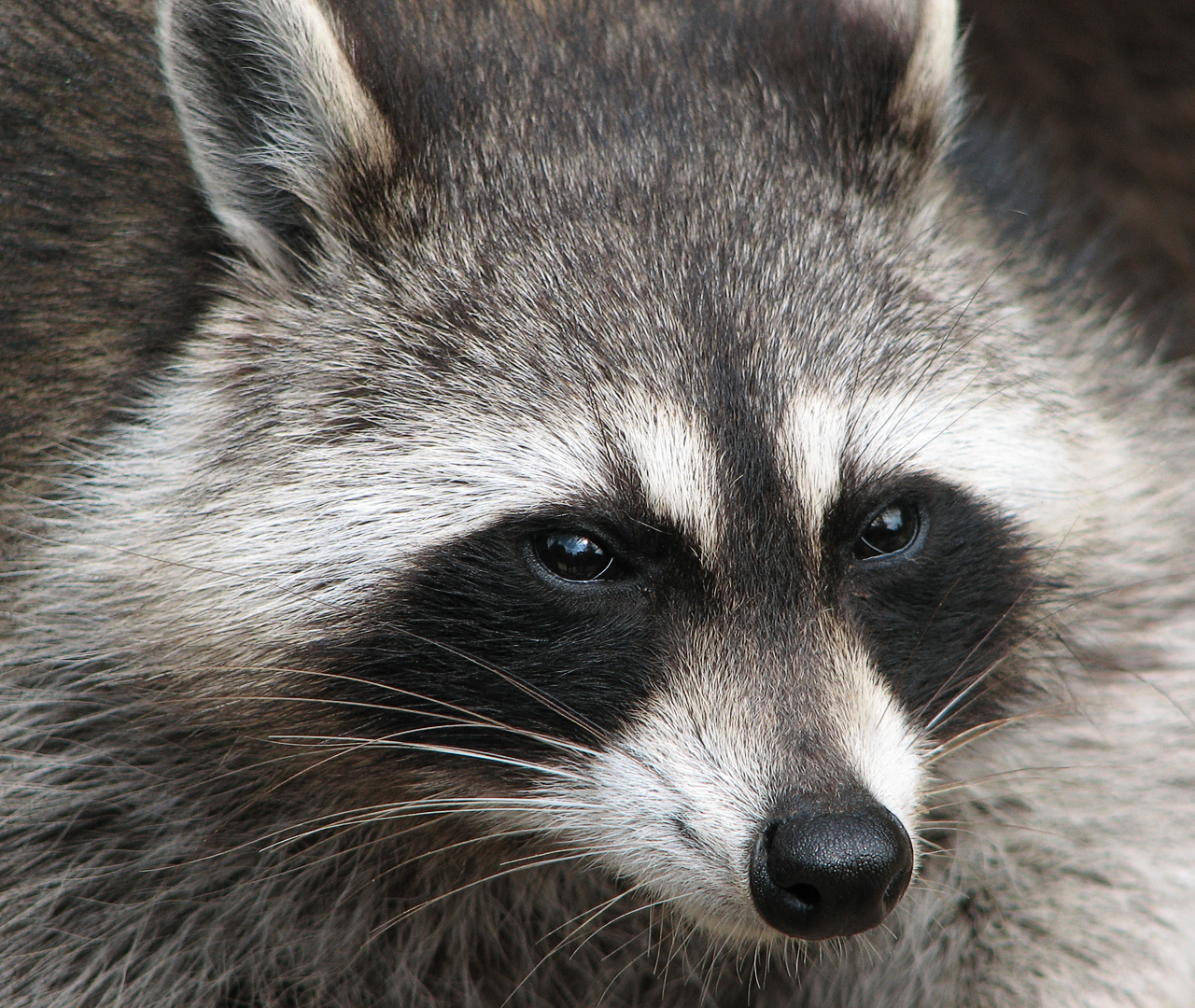
Raccoon

Shrub layer with of willow, aspen, and oak. Some of the major grasses were reed canary grass and blue joint grass. Cattails and rushes were also dominant in some areas. Cover ranged from animals being able to hide in clumps animals able to move about without being seen.

Species found
The masked shrew was most prominent. Meadow vole had been seen along the edge of wet areas at Hoosier Prairie. The white-footed mouse and the northern short-tailed shrew also in abundance. Other mammals were prairie deer mice, common raccoons, meadow vole, and meadow jumping mouse. Sign of the eastern mole, the woodchuck, the common raccoon and the white-tailed deer were seen.

== Terrestrial shrubland ==
No major terrestrial shrubland exists at the lakeshore. Instead, there is a shrubby area between the grass-covered dunes and the forested dunes. They consist of saplings of oaks, conifers, basswood; other trees soon to populate; and sometimes other species such as grape, cherry, and bearberry.

=== Lowland terrestrial shrubland ===
This habitat may be willow thickets, red maple thicket or an aspen thicket. Some are former sand mines which are returning as dry prairie, including clumps of little bluestem grass or red osier dogwood.

Species found
No species of mammals were dominant or even abundant in this habitat. Mammals found include white-footed mice, northern short-tailed shrews, thirteen-lined ground squirrels, Virginia opossums, common raccoons, woodchuck, red squirrel, and meadow vole. Sign may be seen of eastern cottontail, white-tailed deer, and the eastern mole. The use of this area is transitory as the area habitat is transitory.

=== Upland terrestrial shrubland ===
Upland terrestrial shrubland are disturbed areas between grassy old field or savanna and wooded habitats.

Species found
The meadow voles and shrews reflect the former fields rather than the current shrubs. In the woody vegetation there is a range of animals from small to large including meadow voles, short-tailed shrews, white-footed mice, raccoons, masked shrew. prairie deer mouse, prairie vole, and meadow jumping mouse. Signs of white-tailed deer, eastern cottontail, eastern chipmunk, eastern fox squirrel, domestic dog, and red fox were found.

== Savanna ==
The lakeshore includes three types of savanna. Oak savanna constitutes about 3% of the area, coniferous savanna about 0,196, and mixed deciduous savanna about 1.0%.

=== Oak savanna ===
Oak savannas are grassy areas with a scattering of black oaks. These areas grade black oak forest. It is often difficult to decide between black oak forest and black oak savanna. The oak forest has a canopy of pure black oak. The understory is varied. Common shrubs in the understory include: oak saplings, blackberry, blueberry, rose, and Japanese honeysuckle. Common herbs in the understory include major grasses or sedges. Bracken fern and goldenrod are occasionally significant.

Species found
The white-footed mouse was the most abundant mammal found. The prairie deer mice occur in the sparsely vegetated and dry areas. The white-footed mouse is primarily in the woods but lives in a variety of habitats. Savanna is primarily a thinly wooded habitat that tends to favor the white-footed mouse over the prairie deer mouse. The prairie deer mouse prefers areas where the canopy is thinner and when the undergrowth is thin. Additionally, this habitat included: masked shrews, thirteen-lined ground squirrels, eastern chipmunks, southern flying squirrel, and the common raccoon. Seen in the oak savanna were the white-tailed deer; eastern mole, woodchuck, and eastern fox squirrel; eastern cottontail, eastern chipmunk, and red fox; and eastern gray squirrel.

=== Coniferous savanna ===
Little coniferous savanna occurs in a narrow band between the grassy dunes and the black oak dunes. There is a layer of jack pine and a few black oaks. The shrub layer is very dense, forming fair to excellent cover. Bearberry and little bluestem grass are the dominant plants.

Species found
The white-footed mouse was the abundant. Virginia opossum, thirteen-lined ground squirrel, muskrat, and white-tailed deer, eastern cottontail, prairie deer mouse, meadow vole, red fox, and raccoon identified.

The white-footed mouse was favored in wooded area. The prairie deer mouse was found in open areas. Meadow voles and muskrats were found in moist areas with heavy cover and along interdunal ponds. The thirteen-lined ground squirrel and the prairie deer mouse were found in dry, open areas.

=== Mixed deciduous savanna ===
The mixed deciduous savannas have scattered eastern cottonwoods with little bluestem grass. Other grasses were old witch grass and brome grass. Shrubs included grape, sumac, and bearberry and others. This savanna had a lot of cover for small animals.

Species found
The white-footed mouse was plentiful with northern short-tailed shrews, prairie deer mouse, meadow voles, and raccoons.

== Upland forest ==
Upland forest is the most extensive habitat along the lake. It is divided between upland oak forest mixed deciduous forest, and coniferous forest.

=== Upland oak forest ===
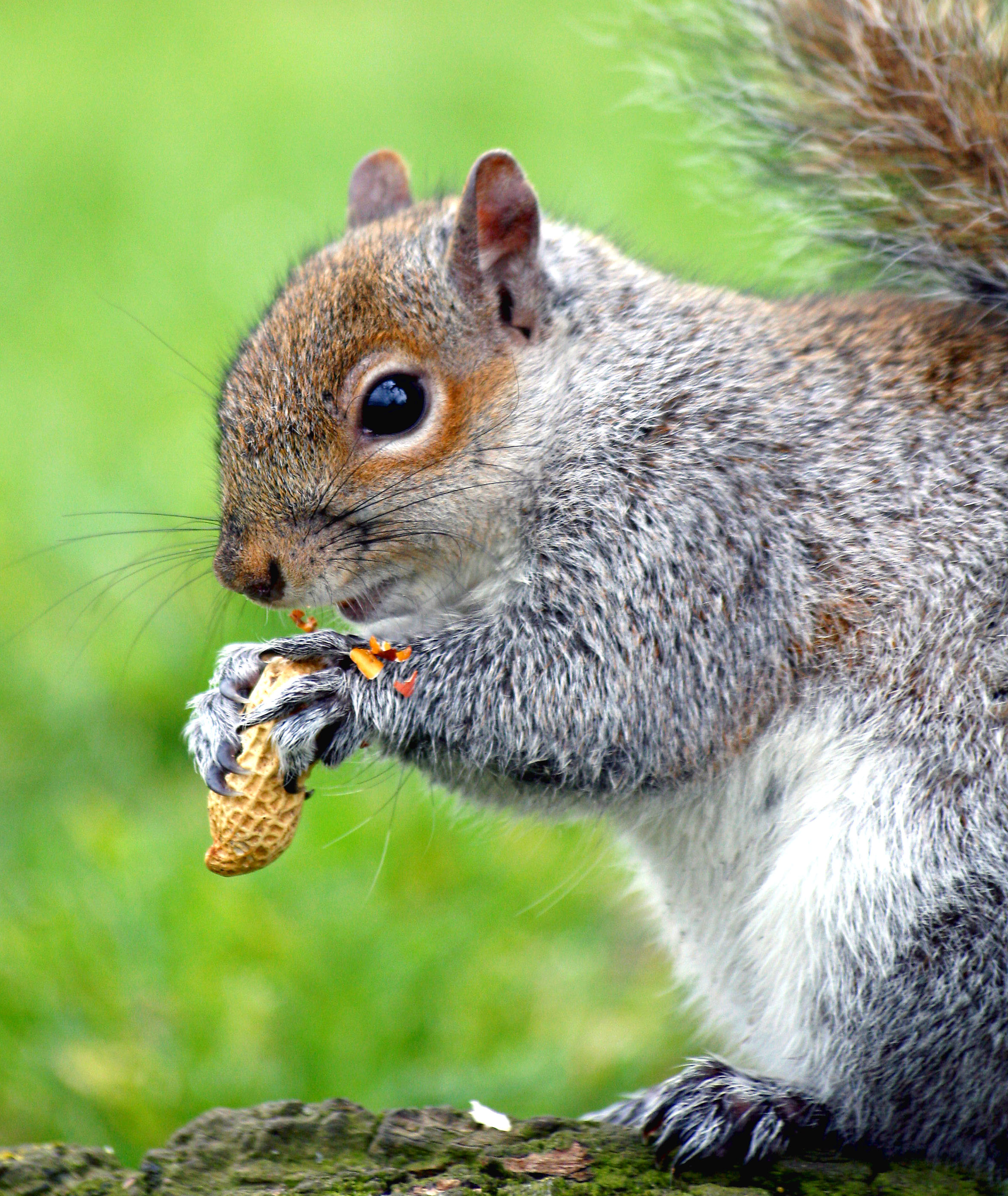
Eastern gray squirrel

Oak forest graded into oak savanna, and together the two habitats made up a major proportion of the area of the lakeshore. Black oak predominates on the higher drier areas and red oak in the lower interdunal areas of the many rows of oak dunes at the lakeshore. Eight plots were included in upland oak forest. Vegetation was studied in six of the eight plots. One was predominantly red oak. Black oak was dominant in the remainder. Black oak forest consisted primarily of rather low scrubby black oaks, with relatively little undergrowth. The shrub layer was often dense and diverse in this habitat, often containing black oak sprouts and blueberry. The herbaceous layer was often diverse, it most often provided poor to fair cover. The dominant herbaceous plants were most often Pennsylvania sedge and bracken fern.

Species found
The white-footed mouse, northern short-tailed shrews, two eastern gray squirrels, eastern chipmunk, and southern flying squirrel. Sign may be seen of white-tailed deer; eastern chipmunk and eastern fox squirrel, eastern mole, eastern gray squirrel, gray fox, long-tailed weasel, and eastern skunk.

=== Upland coniferous forest ===
Conifers are short lived in the dunes. They exist briefly in the shrub stage before the oak forest moves in.

Species found
The white-footed mouse, northern short-tailed shrews, eastern gray squirrels, eastern chipmunk, and a southern flying squirrel. Signs were seen for white-tailed deer were recorded in three plots: eastern chipmunk and eastern fox squirrel and eastern mole, eastern gray squirrel, gray fox, long-tailed weasel, and eastern raccoons, and eastern cottontail.

=== Upland mixed deciduous forest ===
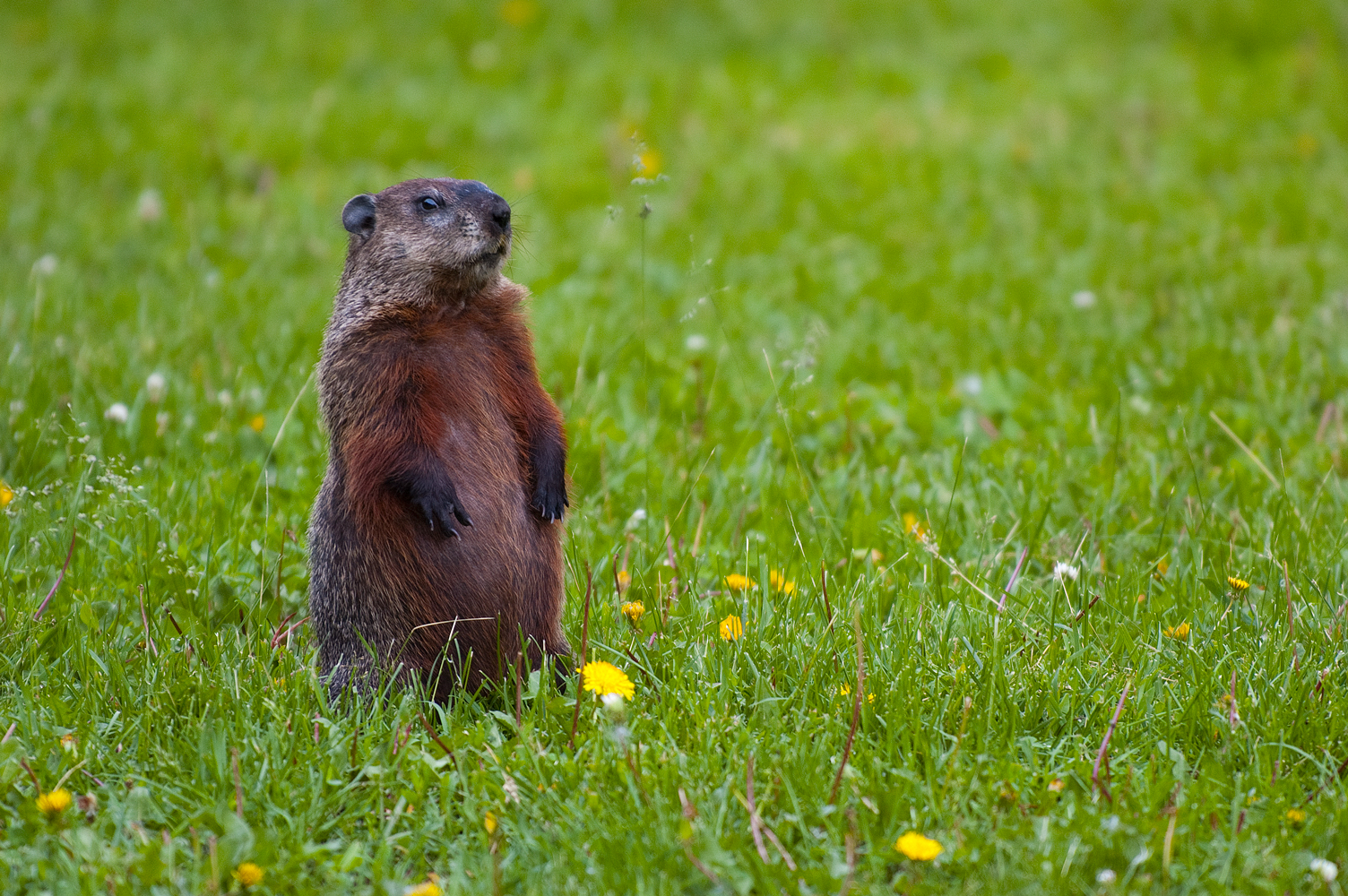
Woodchuck

The upland mixed deciduous forest is dominated buy oaks (black, red, white, and pin) and maples, (red and silver). Some areas are beech-maple forest. Cherry, ash, and elm dominate in a few areas. The shrubs most prevalent are witch hazel, Japanese honeysuckle, blueberry, spicebush, and saplings of several tree species. The ground cover can be sparse or dense.

Species found
The most abundant species is the white-footed mouse. Other mammals found include, the common raccoon, northern short-tailed shrews, Virginia opossum, meadow vole, woodchuck, red squirrel, eastern mole, eastern fox squirrel, and the white-tailed deer

== Lowland forest ==
=== Ephemeral lowland forest ===
Ephemeral lowlands have a dense leaf cover of many different species. Silver or red maple are common with oak and ash, aspen and sassafras present. The shrubs may be closely packed or providing an open sparse cover. Spicebush is common. Numerous seedlings of the trees are present.

Species found
white-footed mice, northern short-tailed shrews, eastern chipmunks, common raccoons, long-tailed weasels, red squirrels, masked shrew, eastern cottontail, meadow vole, woodchuck, white-tailed deer; eastern mole and eastern cottontail.

=== Perennial lowland forest ===
These forest retains water for 6 or more months each year. Vegetation varies greatly in this habitat. Maple are a dominant tree followed by pin oak, black oak, aspen, elm, birch and wild black cherry. These trees are common in the shrub layer, along with others, including blueberries and winterberry. The herb layer varies with graminoids and ferns. The herb and shrub layers were often clumped in hummocks.

Species found

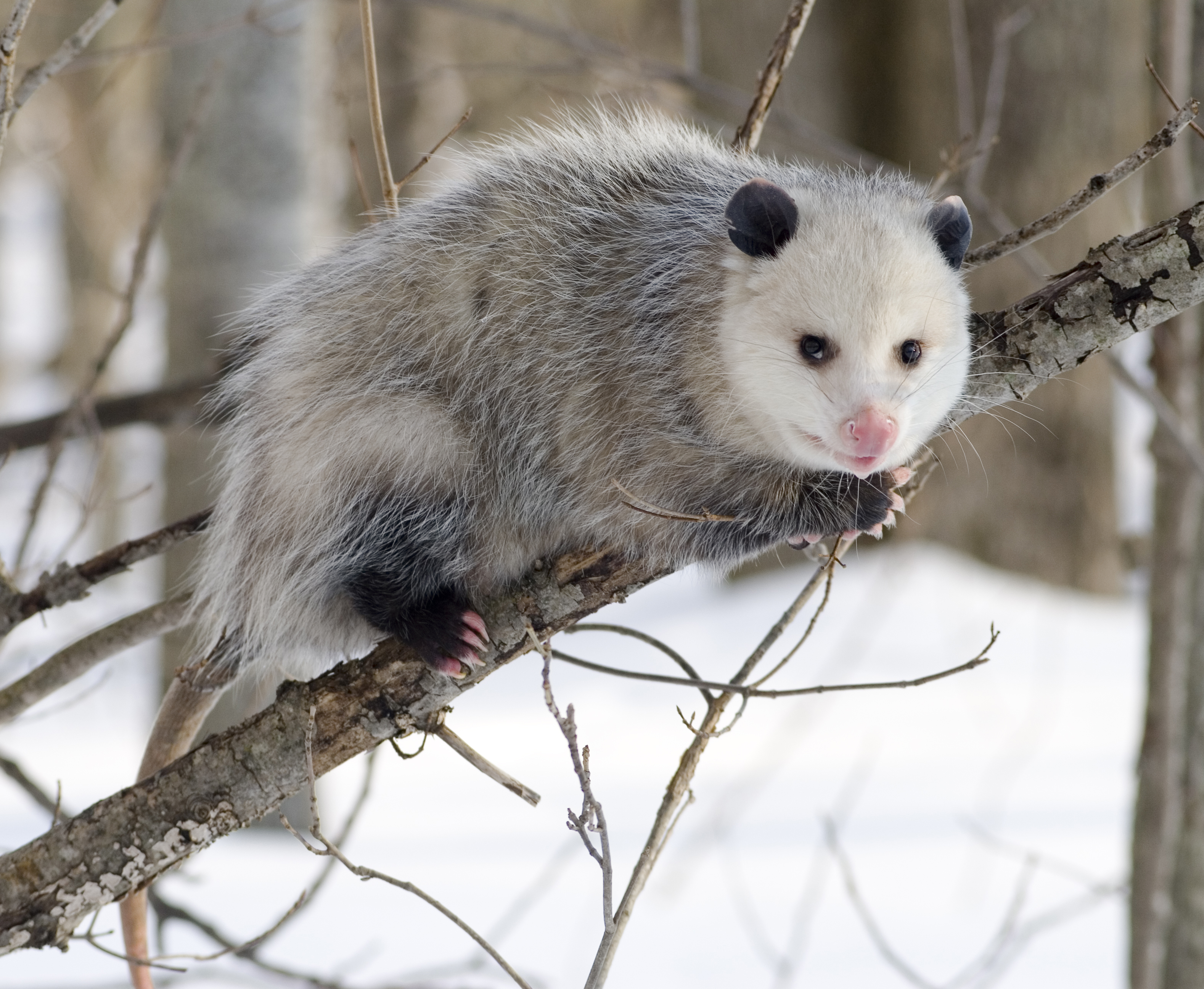
Opossum

The white-footed mouse is very common with raccoons; northern short-tailed shrews; eastern chipmunks; Virginia opossum, masked shrew, meadow vole, woodchuck, and eastern fox squirrel. White-tailed deer and chipmunks are also found. There is evidence of red squirrels, eastern moles, domestic dog, eastern cottontail, meadow vole, woodchuck, and meadow vole.

The star-nosed mole may be present from evidence of burrows. The westernmost site recorded for the star-nosed mole is at Trail Creek at the southern edge of Michigan City just east of the park. Shrews may be more prevalent than the 1988 study found due to the dry conditions that year.

== Wetlands ==
A variety of wetlands exists through the dune lands. Most wetlands are marsh, then aquatic shrub land, swamp, and bog.

=== Marsh ===
Marsh habitat includes the Great Marsh. Many muskrats occur in here marshes, much of the marsh is cattail, with bulrushes, sedges, and sometimes buttonbush. Cowles Bog is a marsh rather than a bog because cattail is the dominant plant. However, it has a floating mat of vegetation typical of a bog, and it does have some typical bog species grass of Parnassus and pitcher plant. This is very little canopy with some scattered willows or elms. The shrub layer consisted of thick buttonbush, willow, or Ribes. The herb layer was often cattail, sedges, or blue joint grass, with occasional false nettle.

Species found
Three species were of near equal importance-the masked shrew, the white-footed mouse, and the meadow vole. The next most common are the northern short-tailed shrew, the raccoon, and the white-tailed deer. Other species include the eastern cottontail, the eastern chipmunk, the meadow vole, woodchuck, the prairie vole, the common muskrat, and the long-tailed weasel. The muskrat is a major species in the marshes, lakes, and ditches near open water.

=== Aquatic shrublands ===
There is little canopy in the aquatic shrub lands and what little there is consist of oak. The shrub layer is aspen, willow, or oak. The herb layer is blue joint grass or cattails.

Species found
The northern short tailed shrew, the white-footed mouse, and the meadow vole were the mammals most widespread in this habitat. The meadow jumping mouse was the largest single species. The eastern cottontail, the prairie vole, the common raccoon, and the white-tailed deer are present.

=== Swamp ===
A very small portion of the lakeshore is swamp, about 1%. The woody canopy is a mix of eastern cottonwood or black willow. Willow dominant the lower layer with blackberry or grape vine. These areas have thick ground cover was of blue joint grass, sedges, and cattails.

Species found

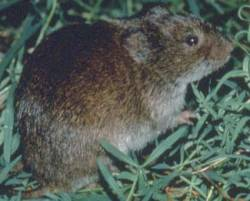
Meadow vole

Much of the swamp habitat is water. Of the smaller animals, meadow voles were found and so were white-footed mice. Also found were common raccoons and fox squirrels. During this survey, signs of the eastern cottontail were found. In another survey by J. 0. Whitaker and R. E. Mumford in the fall of 1978 the swamp areas were found to be populated by masked shrews, white-footed mice, and northern short-tailed shrews. Based on the two surveys done in the swamps, the researchers suspect that the shrew population has been dropping between 1978 and 1994.

=== Bogs ===
Pinhook Bog and Cowles Bog are both acidic and calcareous with poor drainage. There is a mat of Sphagnum over parts of the bogs. Typical plants include pitcher plants, sundew, cotton grass, and poison sumac. Shrubby areas, called heaths include leatherleaf, blueberries, bog rosemary, and cranberries. The perimeter is dominated by tamarack.

Pinhook Bog is a typical bog and used in the last study of mammals. Two areas were study; one was atypical for a bog and the other more typical. In the atypical plot, the dominant plant in the canopy was willow. The shrub layer included buttonbush, winterberry, poison ivy, wild rose. The dominant grasses were blue joint grass and smartweed --- water heartsease (Polygonurn coccineum). The typical plot had a canopy of tamarack and some pines and willows. In the shrub layer were bog rosemary, leatherleaf, blueberry, and huckleberry. The lowest layer, the herb layer was dominated by contained sphagnum, sedges, and pitcher plant.

Species found
The white-footed mouse was the only mammal taken in more than one study area. Other species include northern short-tailed shrews, one eastern cottontail, eastern chipmunk, and common raccoon. In 1978, 70 small mammals were identified, including masked shrews, northern short-tailed shrews, white-footed mice, meadow jumping mice, meadow voles, and house mice. In 1994, there were no masked shrews in Pinhook. The house mouse while abundant around cultivated fields it is not usually caught in native habitats.

=== Pannes ===
Between the dune ridges, directly behind the beach front dunes are shallow depressions called pannes. Because they are low spots, they can contain water most of the year and will be surrounded by grass and shrubs. Pannes are open and without a canopy layer. Around the edges is a dense shrub layer, often containing red osier dogwood, willow, and Kalm's St. John's wort. The herb layer, closest to the ground tends to be excellent cover through summer and fall. Included in this layer are twig rush, and lake shore rush, strawberry, mountain mint and others.

Species found
Meadow vole was the only regularly occurring species white-footed mice and prairie deer mice were also identified. While both of these species were found in pannes, they were never found in the same panne. Larger species included the Virginia opossum and the northern short-tailed shrew.

== Developed areas ==
=== Razed residential ===
Razed Residential areas have sparse canopy of eastern cottonwood with some maple, elm, ash, and others. The shrub layer is thin but consist of eastern cottonwood, ash, and willow seedlings, wild and multiflora rose, Japanese honeysuckle, blackberry, grape, and red osier dogwood. The herb layer is fair to excellent cover of grasses, goldenrods, and asters. There is no well-developed mammal community.

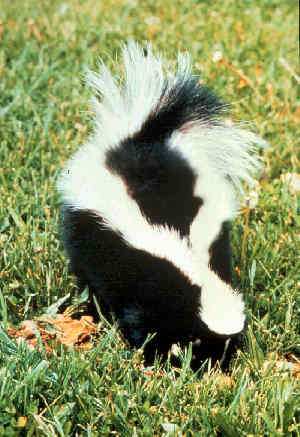
Striped skunk

Species found
The white-footed mouse was the most common mammal present. Other mammals include the raccoon, northern short-tailed shrew, eastern mole, meadow vole, woodchuck, eastern fox squirrel, striped skunk, and white-tailed deer.

=== Rights-of-way ===
Rights-of-way include areas along roads, railroads, or bike trails. Various types of habitats may be disturbed by a right-of-way. Disturbed wet woodland tend to have a quaking aspen canopy and blackberry as the shrub layer. Blue joint grass and touch-me-not. (Impatiens) are the dominant herbaceous plants. There is seldom a canopy layer on Rights-of-ways. The shrub layer ranges from sparse to thick but is sparse in most right-of-ways. Blackberries are a dominant shrub with rose, grapes, Japanese honeysuckle, Spiraea, and shining sumac dominant in some areas. Many herbaceous plants are present. Some dominant species are blue joint grass, other grasses, and rushes. Other plants like marsh fern can be present.

Species found
The mammals of this habitat are the eastern cottontail and the white-tailed deer. Other mammals include the meadow vole, woodchuck and the prairie deer mouse. They are common in areas with the least amount of ground cover. Other species that may be found are the eastern mole, white-footed mouse, eastern fox squirrel, prairie vole, meadow vole, and meadow jumping mouse.

=== Excavated ===
Excavated areas were where open sand existed because of human activities. Examples include former fly ash seepage and the site of an acid spill. All sites lack a canopy and have poor cover with scattered grasses, including little bluestem grass, sand reed, and nodding wild rye. Other area may have Joe-Pye weed, bulrush, and spikerush.

Species found
Few animals use this habitat, such as meadow voles and common raccoons. This is not a good habitat for mammals. Animals that may pass through include the Virginia opossum, the eastern mole, woodchuck, prairie deer mouse, red fox, and white-tailed deer.

== See also ==
- Indiana Dunes National Park
- Indiana Dunes State Park
