= Bog sedge =

Bog sedge is a vernacular name for any of the following plants:

- Carex limosa
- Carex magellanica subsp. irrigua (formerly Carex paupercula)
- Kobresia
