= Cowles Bog =

Wetland complex in Indiana, US

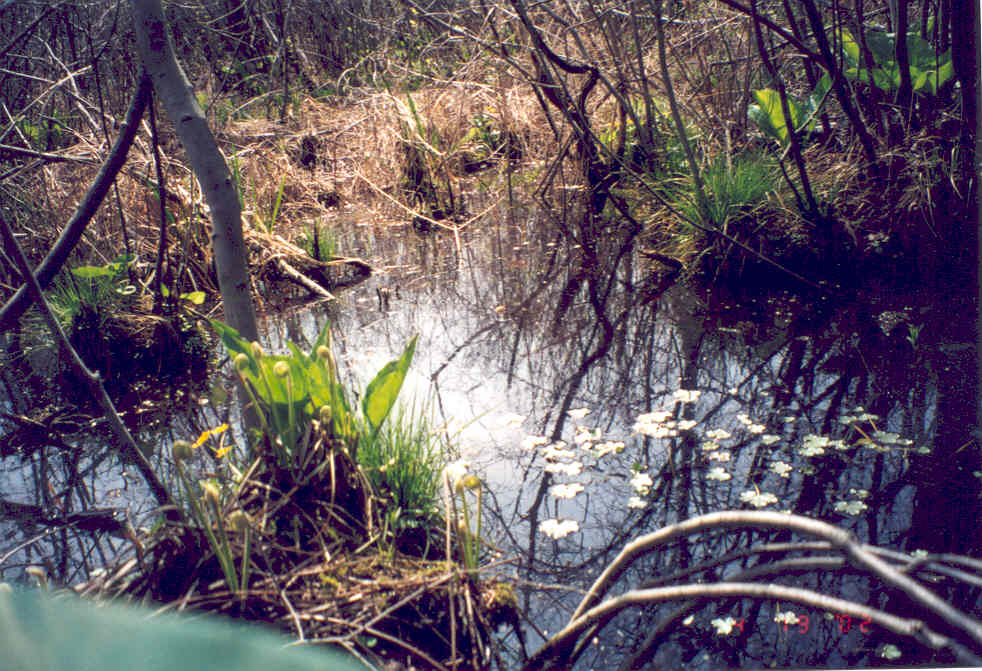
- Cowles Bog in the spring with high water

- Location within Indiana
- Location: Porter County, Indiana, United States
- Nearest city: Michigan City, Indiana
- Coordinates: 41°38′15″N 87°05′32″W
- Area: Indiana Dunes National Park
- Established: 1966
- Governing body: National Park Service

U.S. National Natural Landmark
- Designated: 1965

U.S. National Register of Historic Places
- Designated: April 29, 2025
- Reference no.: 100011750

Cowles Bog is a 4,000-year-old wetland complex in Indiana Dunes National Park, near Chesterton, Indiana. It is named for Henry Chandler Cowles who did his pioneering work in ecology and ecological succession here. His work brought international attention to the area which led to efforts to preserve the Indiana Dunes. It was designated a National Natural Landmark in 1965, and was listed on the National Register of Historic Places in 2025. It contains bog, fen, marsh, wet meadow, swamp, and pond habitats.

== Preservation ==
Cowles had been writing papers on plant succession for several years based on research he did in the area before he was part of the 1913 International Phytogeographical Excursion which brought other international scientists to the site. Dorothy Buell founded the Save the Dunes Council which led to the purchase of the wetland complex.

== Location ==
The wetland is located west of Mineral Springs Road. The general area is accessible by the Cowles Bog Trail of Indiana Dunes National Park. Parking is available at the trailhead, just before the guardhouse to Dune Acres. The trail does not lead into the bog, which is nearly inaccessible due to the nature of the plant life surrounding it. Dr. Cowles work included the bog and the marshlands to the south of the trail and the dune slopes to the north of the trail. Cowles Bog is drained by the West Branch Tributary of Dunes Creek to Lake Michigan.

== Soils ==
Cowles Bog is considered a wetland complex, rather than a 'true' bog such as Pinhook Bog, also a part of the Indiana Dunes National Park. The main body of the bog is composed of muck created from marsh plants and the woody plants that have encroached into the area. Surrounding the bog proper is an area covered with a thin layer of leaf litter over a thin layer of topsoil. The area is moderately acidic. Wet depressions exist which reveal a substratum of Maumee soils, a loamy fine sand. These loamy sands extend southward through the marsh area. To the north the dunes consist of Plainfield fine sand, which is heavily oxidized.

== Vegetation ==
The bog is a wetland woods. In the 1960s, there was still a noticeable open bog. This has effectively closed. The woods is dominated by red maple and yellow birch. There are tamarack, paper birch, and white pine, which together only reach numbers equal to the red maple and yellow birch separately. Immature trees exist in all the lower layers of the woods with the red maple and yellow birch still dominating.

The shrub layer is along the bog's edge and fills the center area of the bog. Dominant here are spicebush and poison sumac. The predominance of poison sumac makes access to the bog very difficult. Additionally, there are quantities of witch hazel, red osier, grape and blackberry.

At ground level, the herb layer includes columbine, boneset, jewel weed, nettle, twinberry, mayapple, hispid greenbrier, meadow rue, narrow-leaved cattail and grape.

Orchids are becoming increasingly more common as restoration work has been going on putting orchids back in their natural habitat. Purple pitcher plant (Sarracenia purpurea), while once common, has been poached from the area and no longer occurs.

== Wildlife ==
The wetland complex primarily supports insect and bird life. Beavers have been known to inhabit the surrounding wetlands in 1988. White Tail Deer are present also.

== Restoration ==
Since the early 1900s, when Cowles studied the 'bog', the land has been changing. The once diverse sedge meadow had been replaced by a monoculture of hybrid cattails. The National Park Service has identified that the changes which have caused this include: changes in seasonal water levels, water chemistry, changes in plant density, and changes in the soil and the seed banks. These changes have been the result of changes in the surrounding area, including the construction or roads and of drainage ditches. In 2009, the national lakeshore received a 3-year grant to begin the restoration of the wetlands.

== Cowles Bog Trail ==
The trail takes you along the northern edge of 'Cowles Bog'. The trail consist of three loops beginning at the Cowles Bog Trailhead parking area. Lake Michigan can be reached on this trail in only 1.7 miles (2.7 km) by using the most direct route.

- The southern loop is 2.0 miles (3.2 km) long around the bog, with a return trip of about 0.8 miles (1.3 km) along Mineral Springs Road.
- The middle loop is 1.7 miles (2.7 km) and takes you into the dunes ridges and interdunal wetlands. It requires that you use the southern loop 0.8 miles (1.3 km) to get to and from it.
- The northern loop is connected to the middle loop and is 1.4 miles (2.3 km) long, crossing the foredunes and reaching Lake Michigan. This is the highest of the dunes and the steepest portion of the trail.

== Cowles research ==
- Cowles, H.C. 1899. Ecological relation of the vegetation on sand dunes of Lake Michigan. Bot. Gaz 27: 95–117; 167–202; 281–308; 361–388
- Cowles, H.C. 1901. The physiographic ecology of Chicago and vicinity. Bot. Gaz. 31: 73–108; 145–182
- Cowles, H.C. 1901. The plant societies of Chicago and vicinity. Bull. Geog. Soc. Of Chicago, No 2: 1–76

== See also ==
- Pinhook Bog
- Indiana Dunes State Park

== Sources ==
- Bennett, L.F. 1917. The sand dune region as a national park. Proc. Indiana Acad. Sci. 26: 261–263
- Buhl, C. A. 1935. Notes on the flora of the Indiana Dunes. Am Midland Nat. 16: 248-253
- Cressey, G.R. 1928. The Indiana sand dunes and shore lines of the Lake Michigan basin. Univ. Chicago Press. Geog. Soc. Of Chicago, Bull. 8
- Eifrig, C.W. 1919. The birds of the sand dunes of northwestern Indiana. Proc Indiana Acad. Sci. 28: 280–303
- Lyon, M.W. Jr, 1923. Notes on the mammals of the dune region of Porter County, Indiana. Proc. Indiana Acad. Sci. 32: 209–221
- -------------------- 1924. Some soil and water reactions in the dunes region of Porter County. Proc Indiana Acad. Sci. 33: 281–284
- Olson, J.S. 1951. Vegetation –substrate relations in the Lake Michigan sand dunes. Ph.D. Dissertation, Univ. Chicago.
- ------------. 1958. Rates of succession and soil changes on southern Lake Michigan sand dunes. Bot. Gaz. 119: 125–170
- Peattie, D.C. 1930. Flora of the Indiana Dunes. Field Museum of Nat. History Chicago, 432p.
- Potzger, J.E. 1938. Some acidity studies in dunes and bogs. Proc. Indiana Acad. Sci 47: 100–105
- Rand, A. L. and A.S. Rand. 1946. Mammal bones from dunes south of Lake Michigan. Am. Midland Nat. 46: 649–659.
- Tryon, R.M. Jr. 1936. Ferns of the dune region of Indiana. Amer. Midland Nat. 17: 425–249.
