= City West, Indiana =

Village in Porter County, Indiana, US

Coordinates: 41.659°N 87.062°W

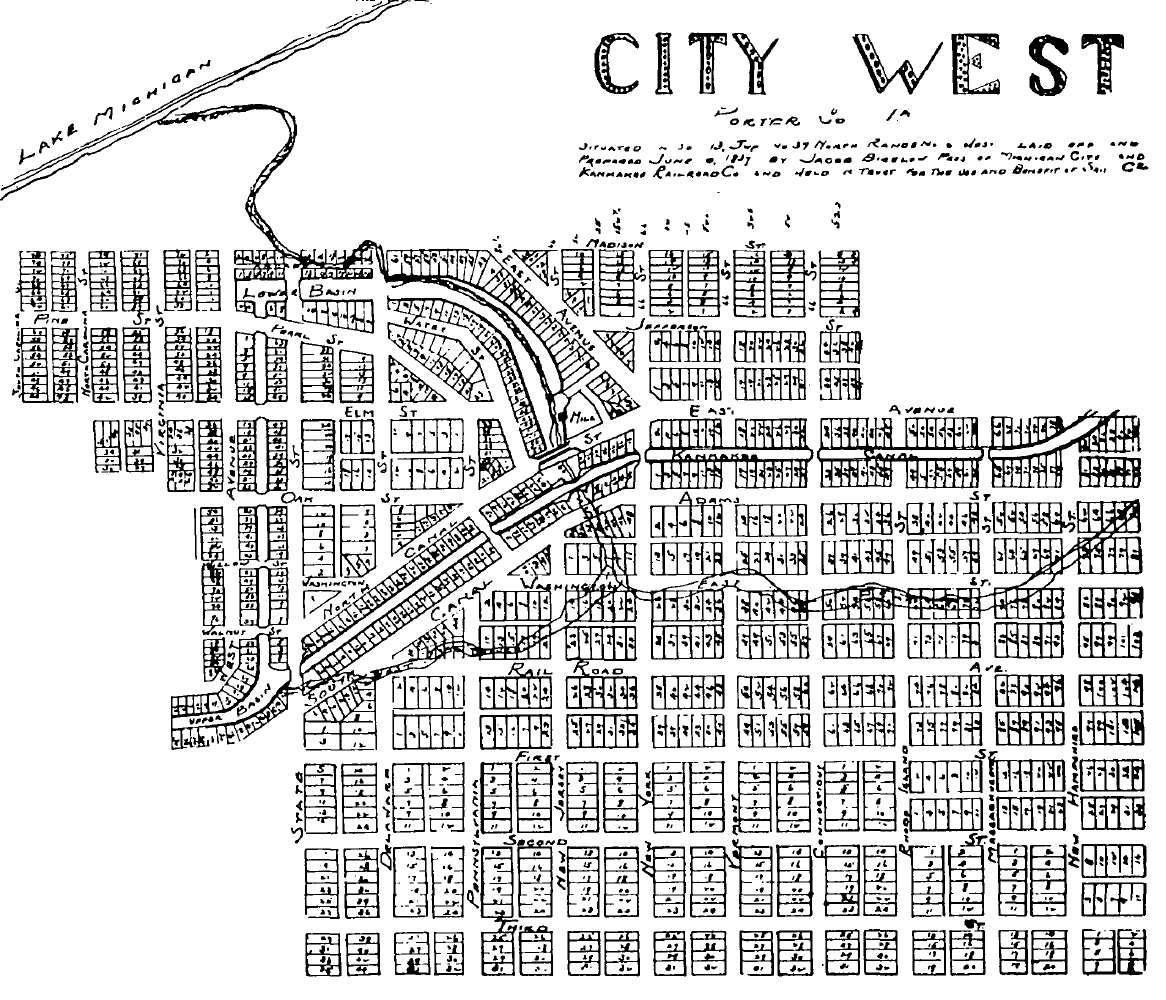
The planned layout of City West, Indiana, as recorded in 1837 by one of its founders, Jacob Bigelow

City West was a village in Porter County, Indiana, US, located on the shore of Lake Michigan approximately 10 miles west of Michigan City, Indiana. It was situated near the mouth of Fort Creek, now known as Dunes Creek, which empties into Lake Michigan near the Indiana Dunes State Park swimming beach. It was located near the former site of Petit Fort.

The town was established in 1836 by Jacob Bigelow, William Morse, Jacob Hobart and Leverett Bradley. By September or October 1839, the town had been completely abandoned, due to the financial panic of 1837, which caused the banks to demand repayment of loans, and the US Federal government not allocating promised money for a port on Lake Michigan near the mouth of Fort Creek.

The village is notable for a visit from US Senator Daniel Webster on July 4, 1837. In a speech before the Whig members of City West, Webster wished the citizens good luck for the future for the "grand city on the lake", which led the overly excited Whigs of City West to think that they had appropriation for a grand port of Indiana.

In 1840, there was a visit to the now abandoned village by a few people, including a 12-year-old T.H. Ball, who found only empty homes at the site of the village. The last word of the fate of City West was in 1854, when people nearby noticed the smell of burning wood and a glow in the sky in the direction of City West and Lake Michigan. Investigation later that month found the village to be in ruin from fire with only the wooden 650-foot pier jutting out into Lake Michigan surviving the destruction. The pier survived into the late 1870s before falling into disrepair and disappearing into the lake.

As platted, the town covered 25 blocks, with rights of way for a railroad and a canal connecting the lake to the Little Calumet River; neither the railroad nor the canal were ever constructed. At its peak, the town was home to between sixteen and twenty households. There were no schools or formal churches. The town's businesses included a sawmill, which used water power from Fort Creek, and a large hotel. After standing vacant for several years, the hotel was moved to Chesterton in the early 1850s.

Between the town and the lake stood a Potawatomi burial ground, and the town was frequently visited by Potawatomi trading parties on their way to Baillytown. Burials occurred at the Potawatomi cemetery as late as 1838.

The old town site is now on Indiana Dunes State Park property with the only trace being a newly built park shelter named City West Shelter.

== Works cited ==
- Ball, Timothy Horton (1900). Northwestern Indiana from 1800 to 1900. Donohue & Henneberry, printers.
- Schoon, Kenneth J. (2003). Calumet Beginnings. ISBN 978-0-253-34218-8.
