= Pinhook Bog =

Bog in Indiana, U.S.

Pinhook Bog National Natural Landmark
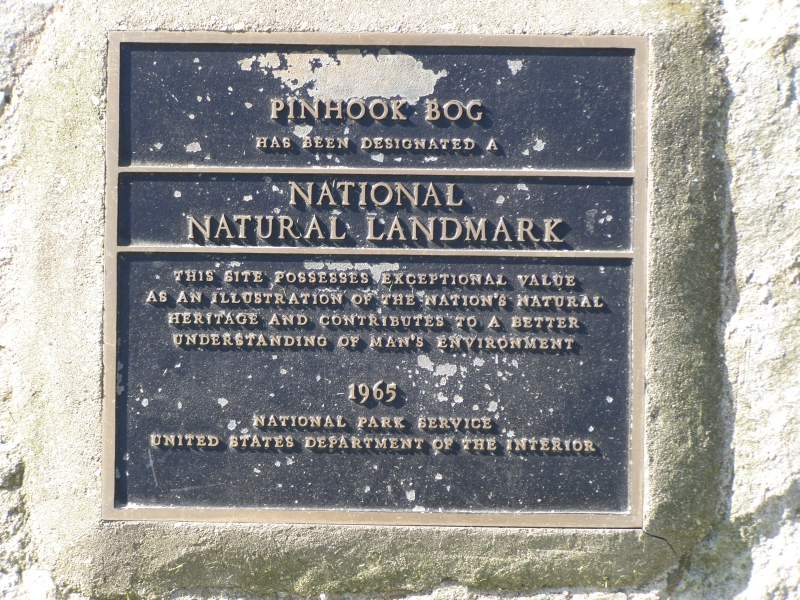
- Interactive map of Pinhook Bog National Natural Landmark
- Location: LaPorte County, Indiana, United States
- Nearest city: Michigan City, Indiana
- Coordinates: 41°36′54″N 86°50′54″W
- Area: 25 acres (100,000 m^{2})
- Governing body: National Park Service

U.S. National Natural Landmark
- Designated: 1965

Pinhook Bog is a unique bog in Indiana that has been designated a National Natural Landmark. It is part of Indiana Dunes National Park, an area that many citizens, scientists, and politicians fought hard to preserve. Its sister bog, Volo Bog (not to be confused with a bog of the same name in Illinois), is located nearby. The bog contains a large variety of plants, including insect eating plants, tamarack trees, stands of blueberry bushes, and floating mats of sphagnum moss. Pinhook Bog is about 580 acres (2.3 km^{2}), a quarter of which is a floating mat of sphagnum peat moss. A "moat" separates the bog from the uplands.

== Geology ==
The bog is a glacial kettle. At the end of the Wisconsin Glacial epoch about 14,000 to 15,000 years ago, a large chunk of ice remained buried at this location as the ice retreated northward. When the ice melted, the clay soil sealed the basins.

Precipitation and runoff from higher ground around the bog are the only water sources. There is no stream or groundwater inflow or outflow. Evaporation from the open water and plants is the only loss of moisture. A bog differs from swamps, marshes, and ponds because of this limited exchange of water. The water in the bog is stagnant, acidic, and nutrient-poor.

== Plants ==
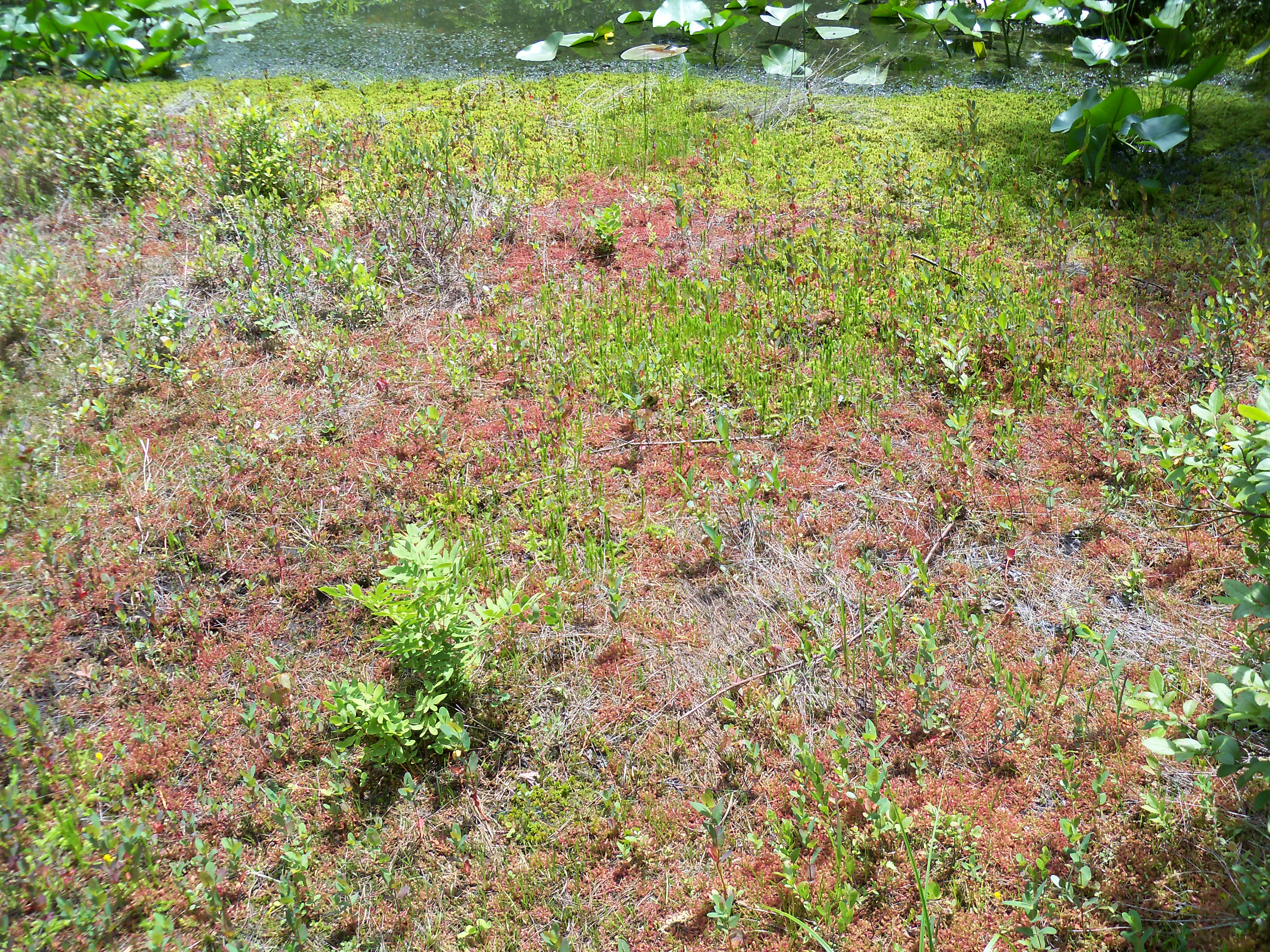
Part of the floating mat of vegetation.

The outstanding feature of Pinhook Bog is the tree-covered mat of sphagnum moss. Sphagnum moss is a stringy, delicate moss of a light-green color. The mat floats on top of the water and can become 3 to 6 feet (0.91 to 1.83 m) thick, yet it can have a pocket only a few inches thick in the middle. As the mat thickens, larger and larger plants take root and grow. Under the mat a peat bed develops. The acidic water slows the decay of the sphagnum moss and other plants. With time, the peat may fill the bog from the mat to the bottom. As the moisture becomes less acidic, typical land plants take root and the bog disappears.

Orchids:

- Pink lady's slipper, stemless lady's-slipper, or moccasin flower (Cypripedium acaule) is pink, deep rose, to white color flower. It is the only lady's slipper with no stem leaves. The plant can grow 12 to 18 inches (30 to 46 cm) high.
- Yellow fringed orchid, yellow-fringed orchis, or orange-fringed orchid (Platanthera ciliaris) is a fairly tall orchid with a flower cluster that can be 6 inches (15 cm) tall and the entire plant about 7 to 40 inches (18 to 102 cm) tall. The flowers can be yellow to orange.
- Rose pogonia or snake mouth orchid (Pogonia ophioglossoides) is a small pink orchid found in the bog near the end of the boardwalk. The orchid is about 1 foot (0.30 m) tall and the flower about 2 inches (5.1 cm) long.

Carnivorous plants:

- Spoonleaf sundew (Drosera intermedia) is a tiny plant with spoon/teardrop shaped leaves covered in mucilage-tipped tentacles.
- Round-leaved sundew (Drosera rotundifolia) is a tiny plant with rounded leaves covered in mucilage-tipped tentacles.
- Purple pitcher plant (Sarracenia purpurea) has heavily veined reddish or purple leaves in the strong sunlight that are folded to form a pitcher or cup, which is normally about half full of liquid containing digestive juices.
- Horned bladderwort (Utricularia cornuta) is a small terrestrial carnivorous plant that possesses bladder-shaped traps that feed on small soil insects. It usually goes unnoticed by rangers and visitors because its leaves are so small and instead is recognized by its flower.
- Hidden-fruited bladderwort (Utricularia geminiscapa) is a small aquatic carnivorous plant that possesses bladder-shaped traps that feed on small aquatic insects.

Poison sumac is prevalent in the bog area, particularly around the outer edge, the "moat". It is recognized by its compound leaves of seven to thirteen leaflets. The leaflets have smooth edges and are pointed.

Tamarack or American larch is an unusual tree for northwest Indiana. It is a conifer, but not an evergreen. It drops its leaves in the winter. As fall approaches, the needles turn golden until they fall off.

Blueberry and cranberry shrubs are common along the margins. Rusty cotton grass farther down the trail flourishes.

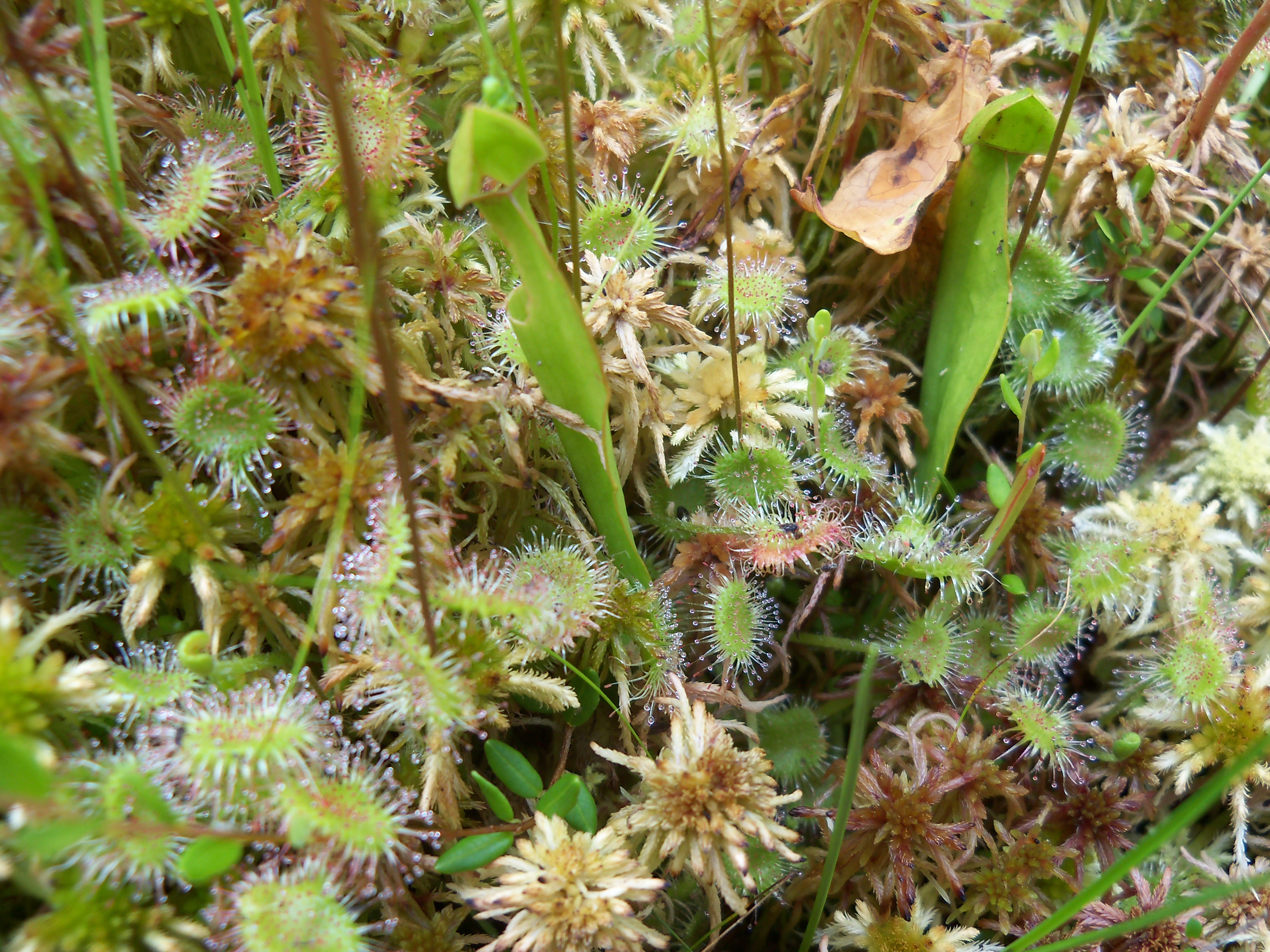
Round-leaved sundew and baby purple pitcher plants

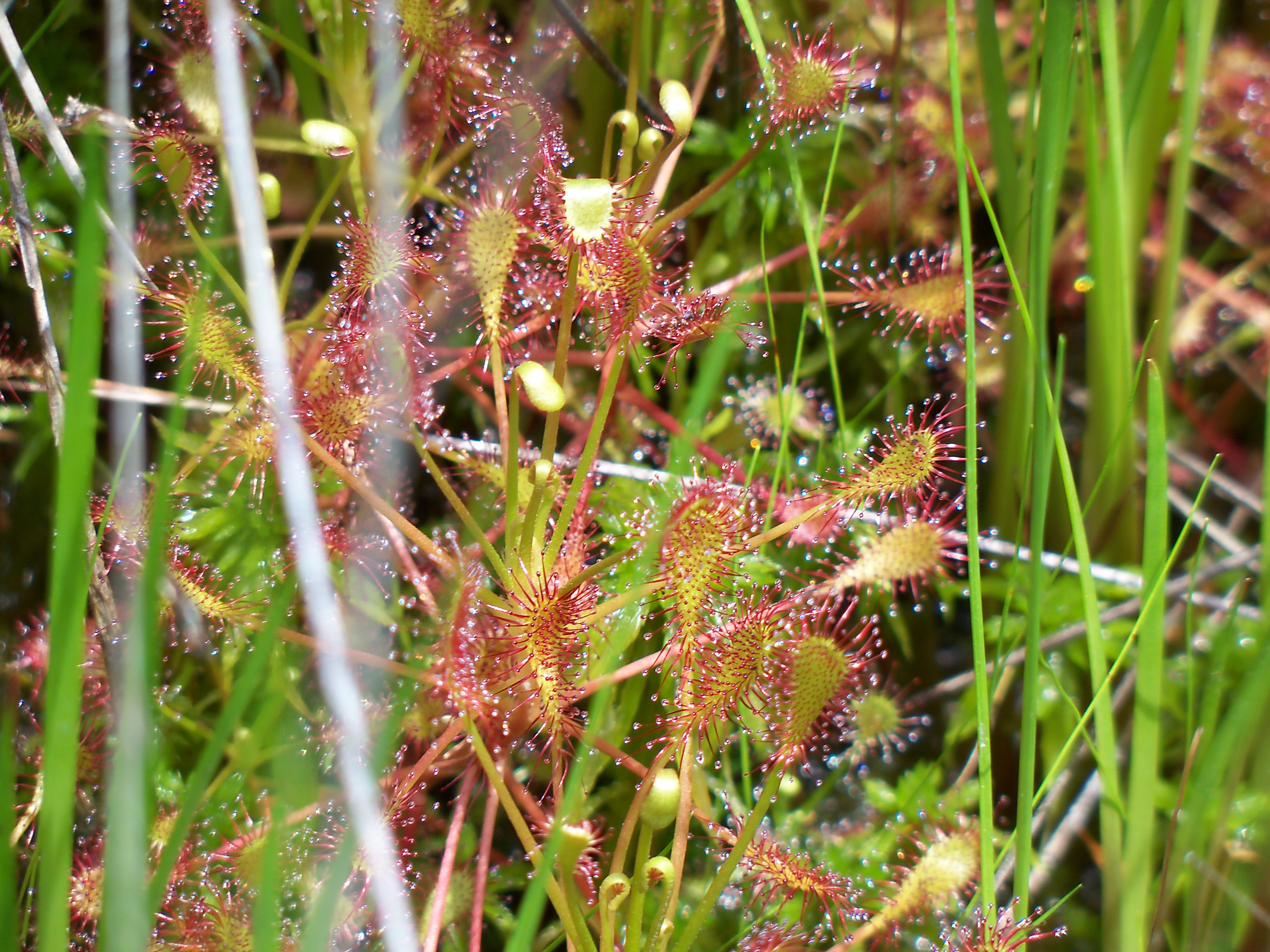
Spoonleaf sundew

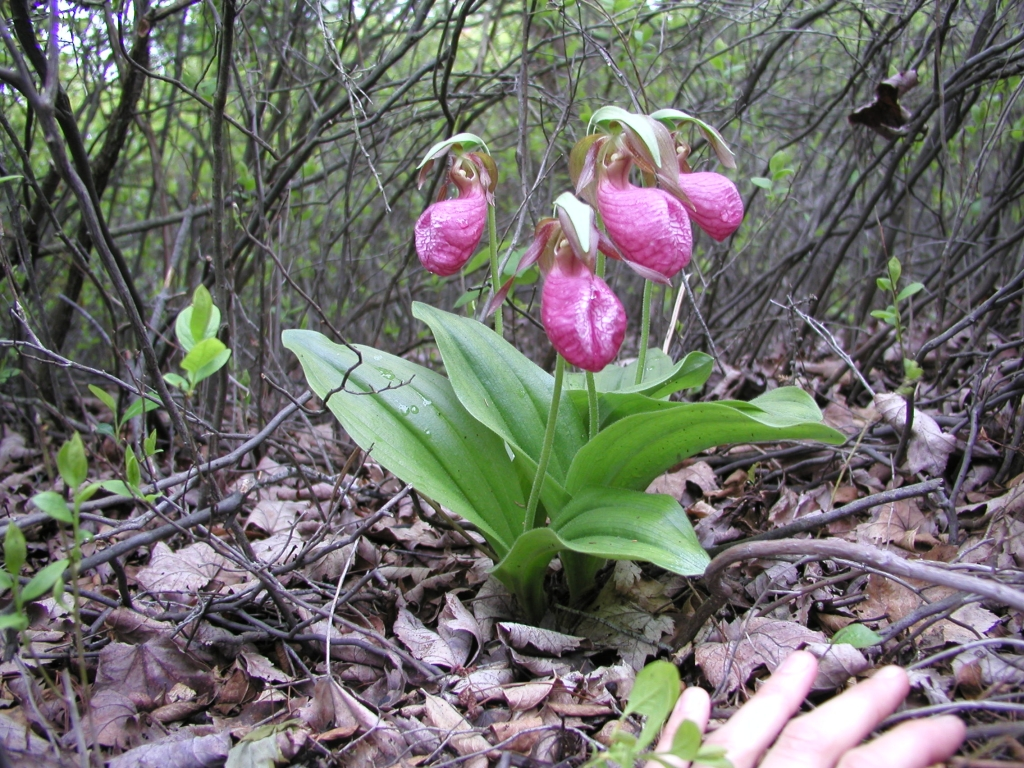
Pink lady slipper

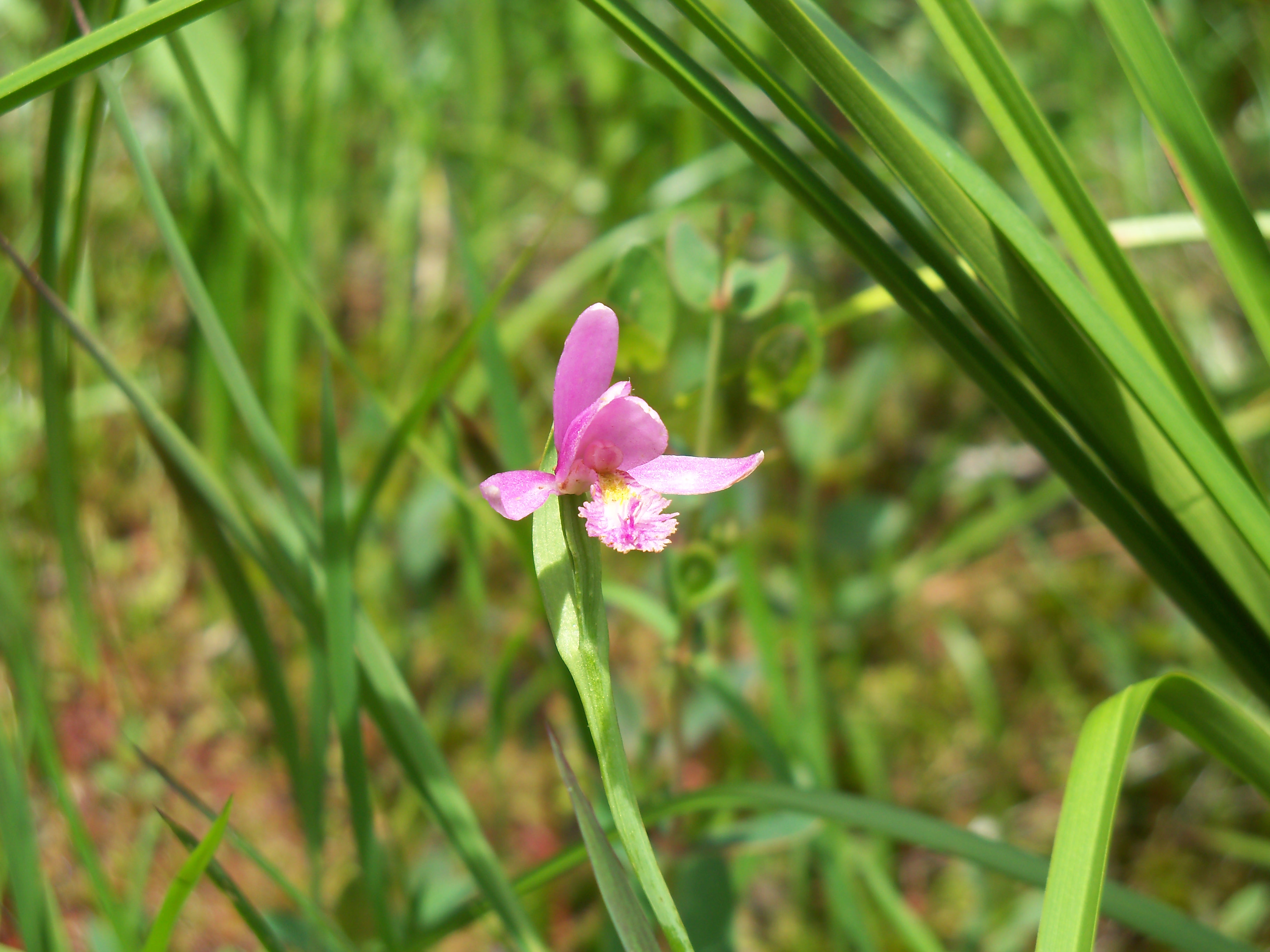
Rose pogonia

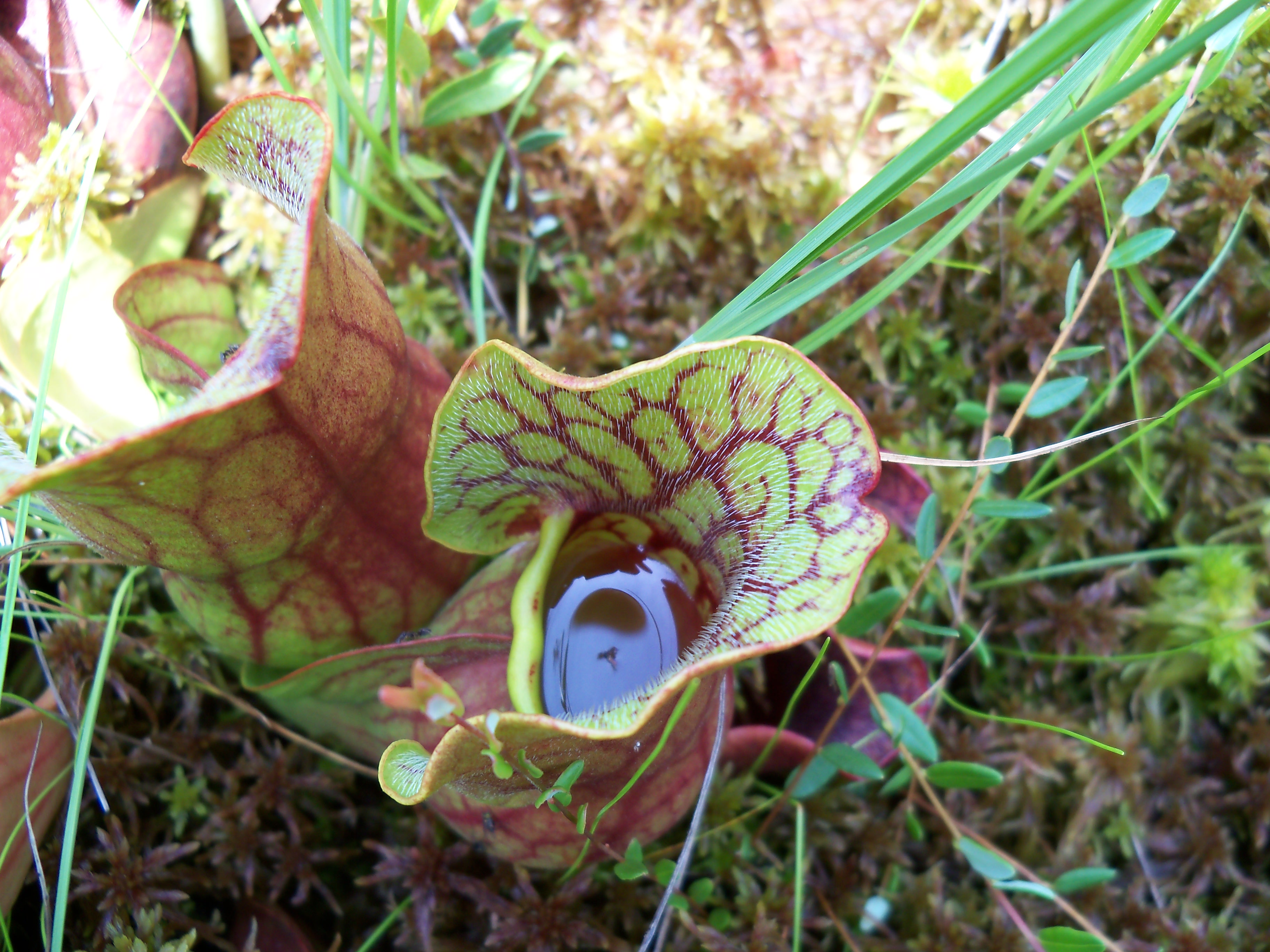
Purple pitcher plant

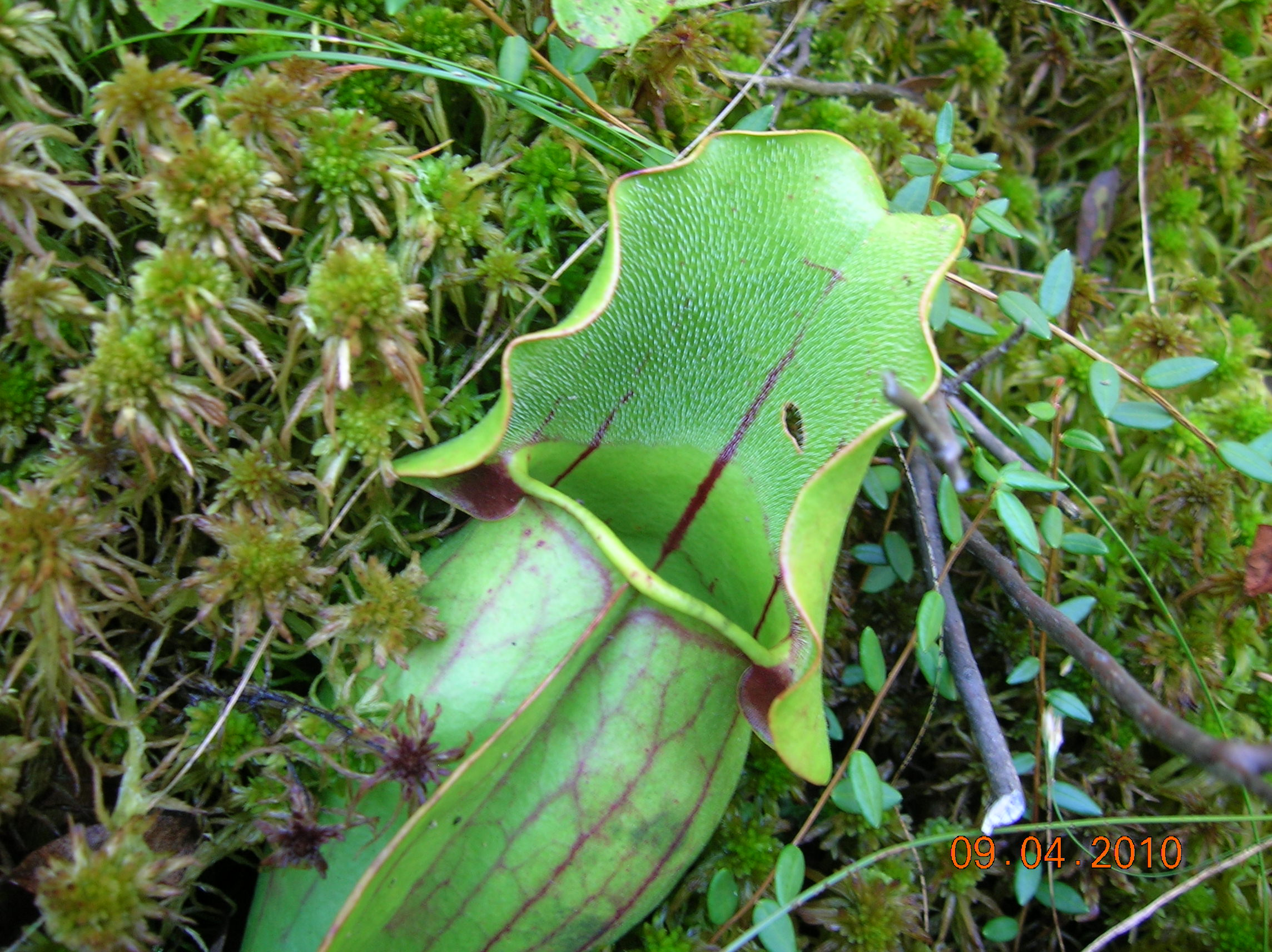
Purple pitcher plant

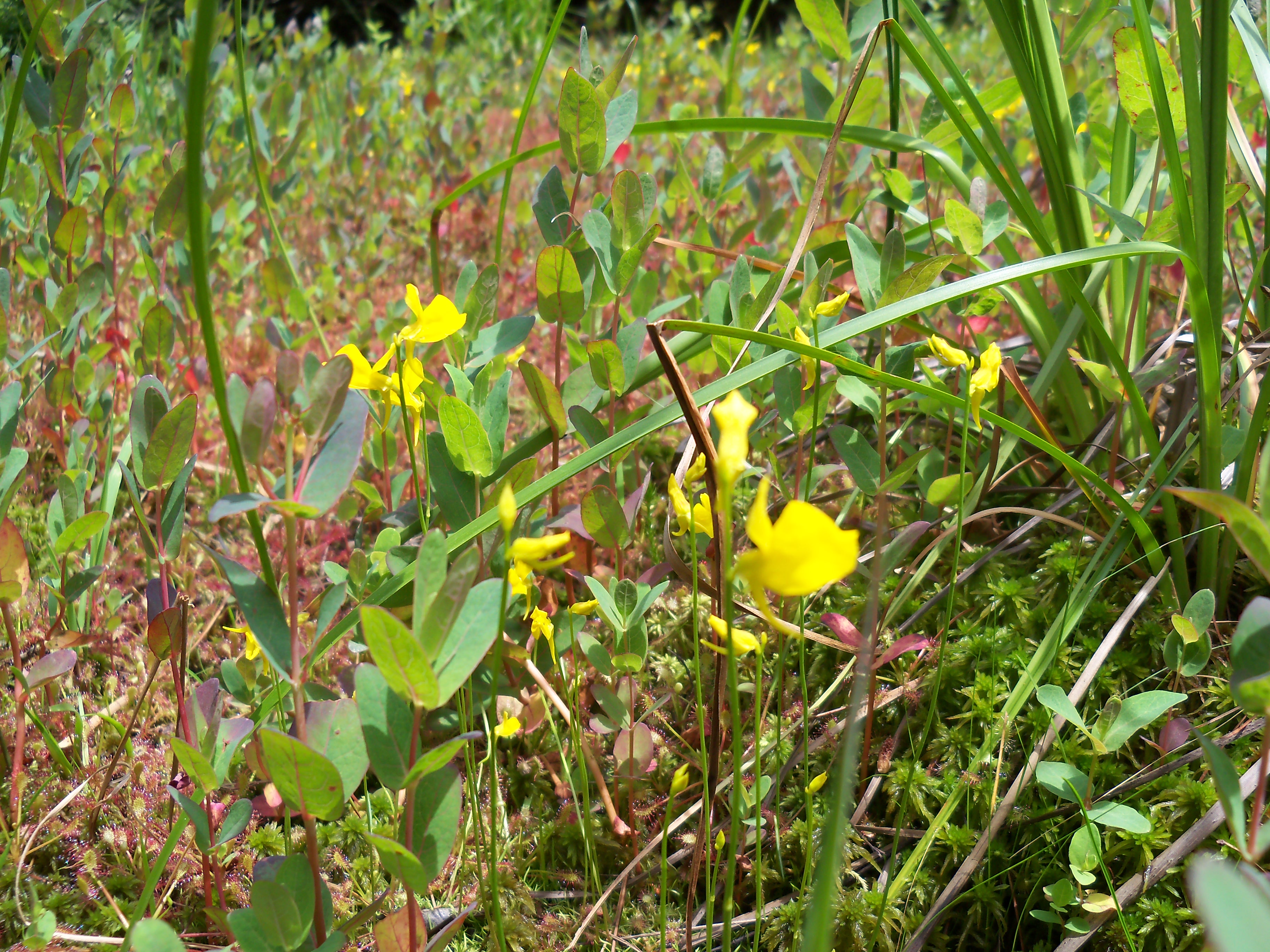
Horned bladderwort

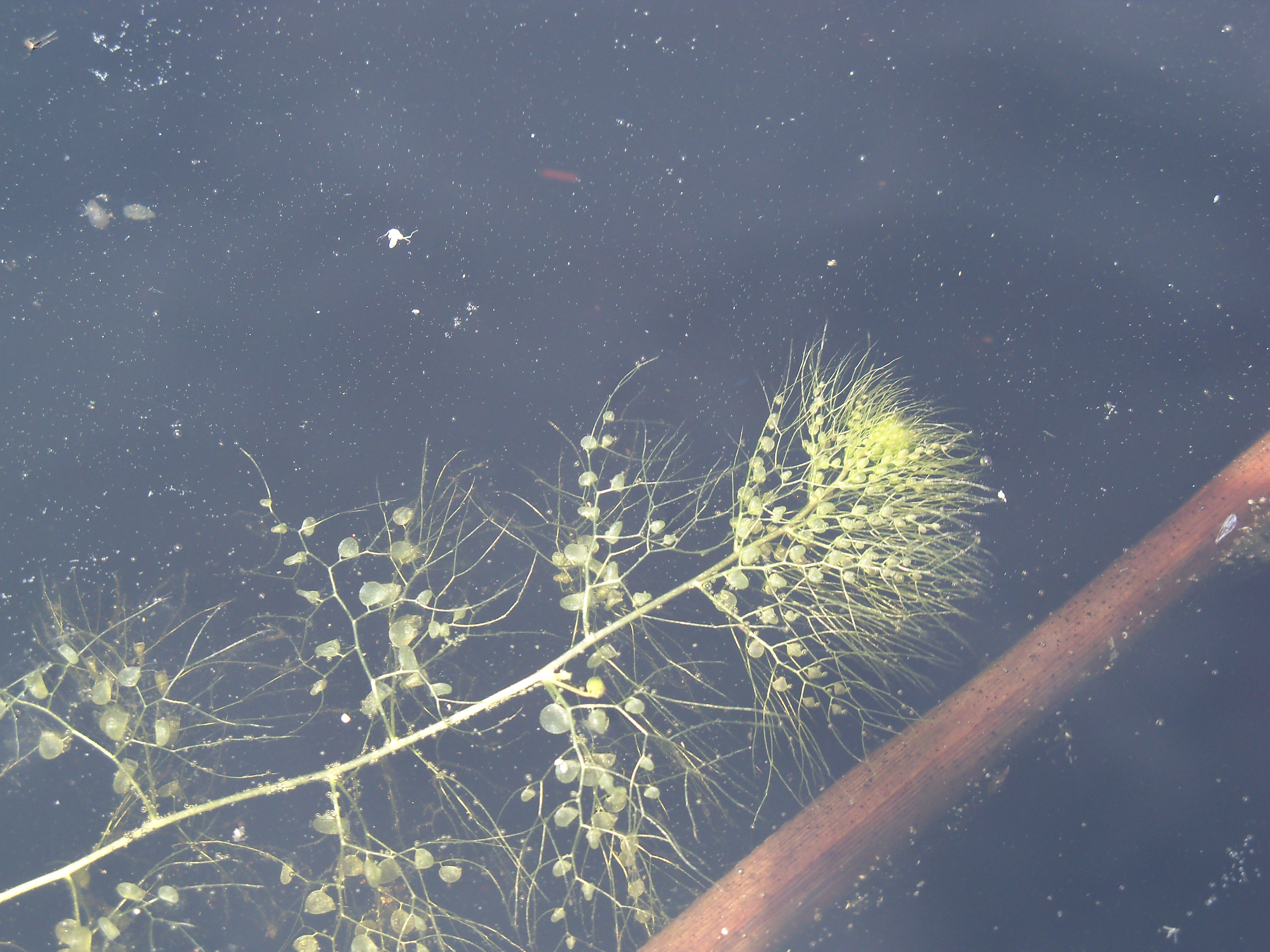
Hidden-fruited bladderwort

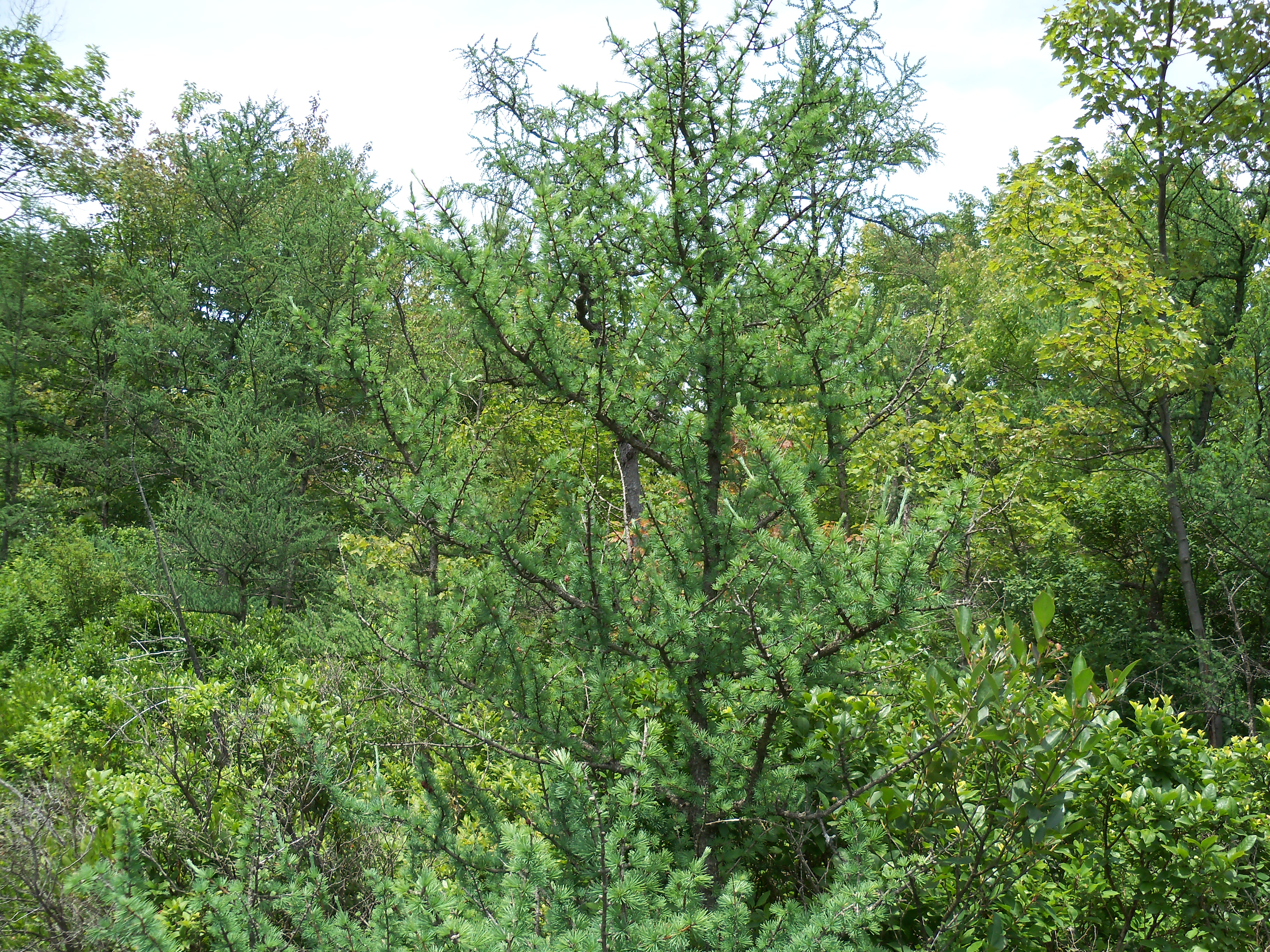
Tamarack or American larch

== Access ==
The Pinhook Bog is open for specially scheduled ranger-guided tours and for infrequent open houses. Starting at the parking lot off Wozniak Road, a leisurely trail of about 1/2 mile (0.80 km) leads through the woods to the entrance to the bog, which is gated and locked during non-tour hours. Within the bog, one can walk along a plastic boardwalk which is about 1/4 mile (0.40 km) long.

== See also ==
- Cowles Bog National Natural Landmark at Indiana Dunes National Park
- Indiana Dunes State Park, where the National Natural Landmark Dunes Nature Preserve is located
- Kettle (landform)

== Bibliography ==
- Daniel, Glenda; Dune Country, A Hiker's Guide to the Indiana Dunes; Illustrated by Carol Lerner; Swallow Press; Chicago, Illinois; 1984
- Greenberg, Joel; A Natural History of the Chicago Region; University of Chicago Press; Chicago, Illinois; 2004
