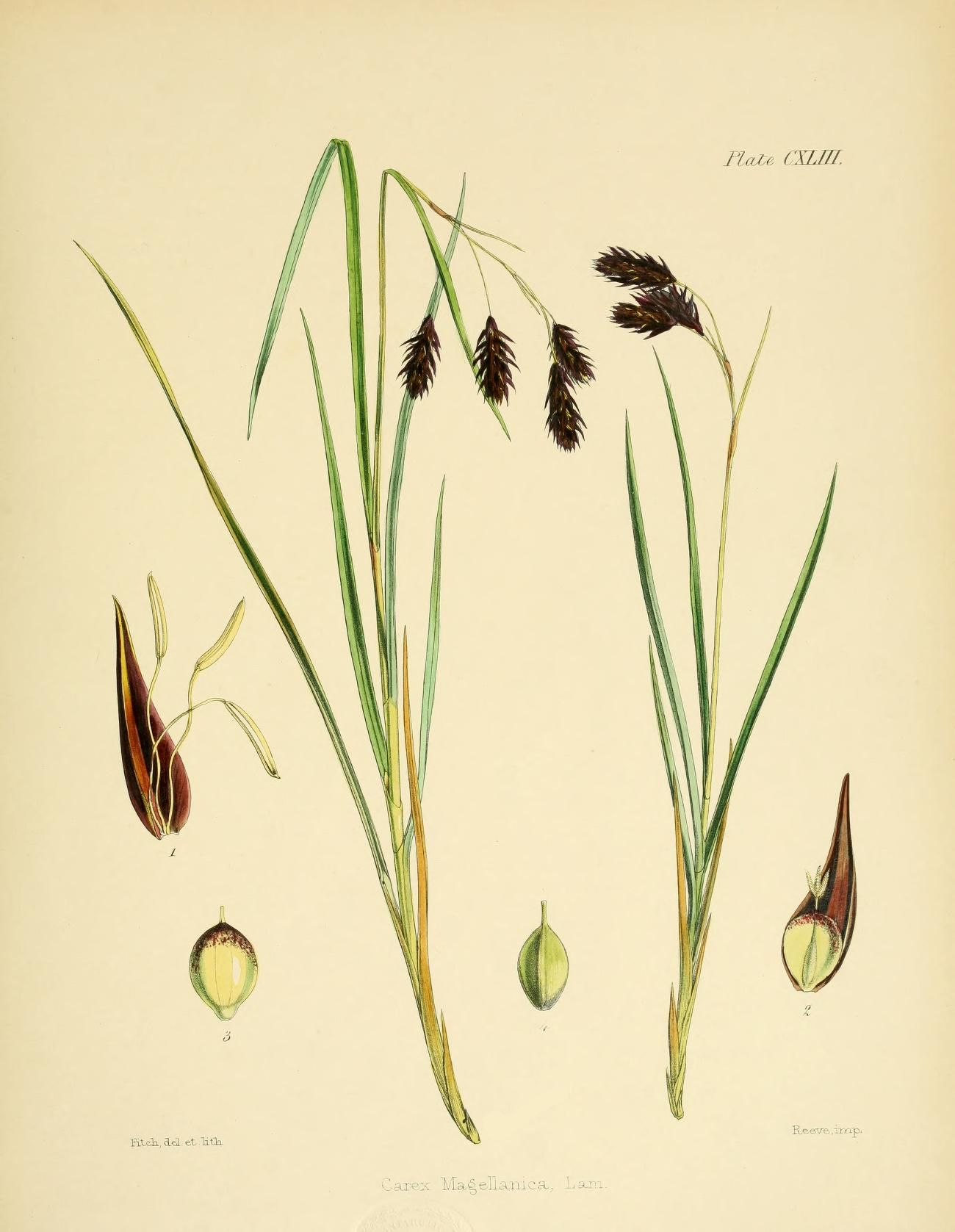

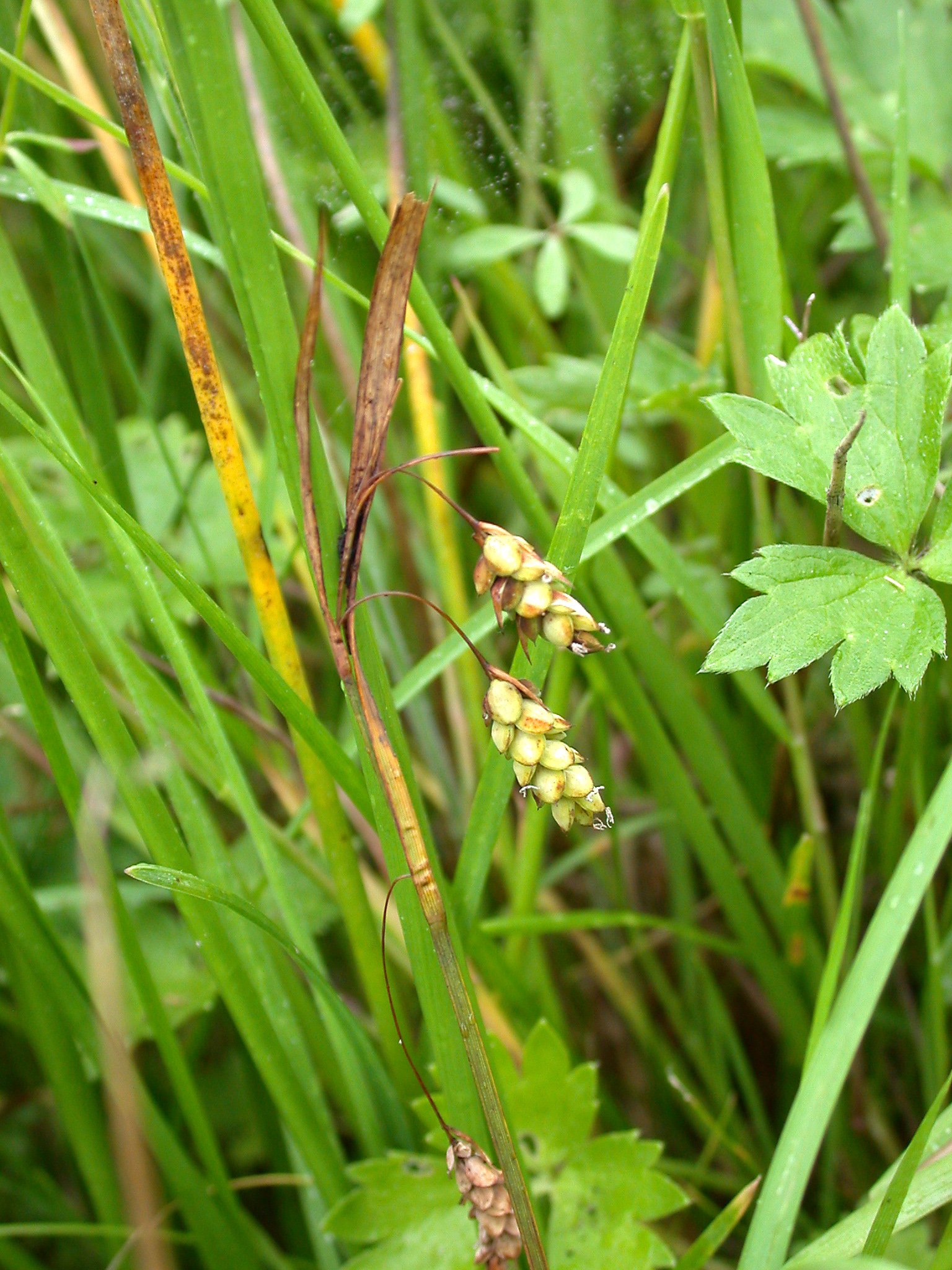

Conservation status
- Least Concern (IUCN 3.1)

Scientific classification
- Kingdom: Plantae
- Clade: Tracheophytes
- Clade: Angiosperms
- Clade: Monocots
- Clade: Commelinids
- Order: Poales
- Family: Cyperaceae
- Genus: Carex
- Species: C. magellanica

Binomial name
- Carex magellanica Lam.

= Carex magellanica =

Species of grass-like plant

Carex magellanica, (common names, boreal bog sedge or tall bog sedge) is a perennial Carex species native to North America, Europe and the subarctic Northern hemisphere. Although it is considered a stable species worldwide, it is listed as endangered in Connecticut.

== Description ==
Carex magellanica is a perennial sedge, which grows loosely tufted from a short to long rhizome. Its culms grow upward of 55 cm (22 in), and are leafy in their lower part. These leaves are shorter than the culms, and 2–4 mm (0.079–0.157 in) wide, distinguishing the plant from the similar Carex limosa, or "muck sedge", which has leaves greater than 4 mm (0.16 in) in width. Its terminal spikelet is contains only the stamen, with one to four other spikelets that are ovoid and pistillate, arranged on drooping, slender peduncles.

== Distribution and habitat ==
Carex magellanica favours wet ground, marshes, waterways and Sphagnum bogs.
