= Dunes Creek =

Dunes Creek Fort Creek
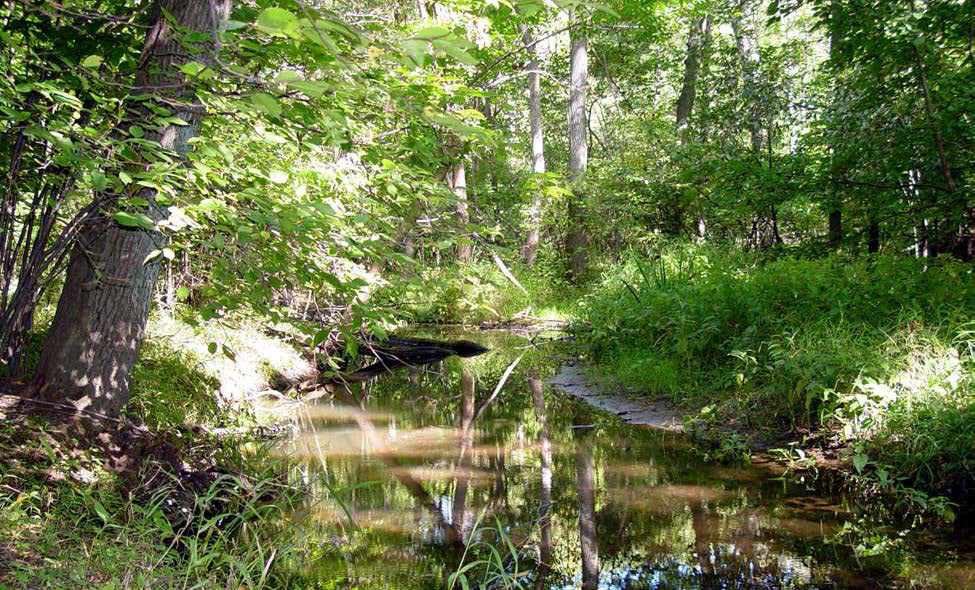
- Dunes Creek

- Location of the mouth within Indiana

Location
- Country: United States
- State: Indiana
- Region: Porter County
- City: Chesterton, Indiana

Physical characteristics
- Source
  - coordinates: 41°37′53″N 087°03′49″W
  - elevation: 670 ft (200 m)
- Source confluence: Great Marsh
- Mouth: Lake Michigan
  - coordinates: 41°39′47″N 087°03′42″W
  - elevation: 620 ft (190 m)

Basin features
- Tributaries
  - left: West Branch Dunes Creek
  - right: Great Marsh Tributary

Dunes Creek is a northwards-flowing 4.3-mile-long (6.9 km) stream which drains the Great Marsh of Indiana Dunes State Park and Indiana Dunes National Park in Porter County, Indiana, United States. Dunes Creek passes through the coastal sand dunes to empty into Lake Michigan.

== History ==
Petit Fort was established at the mouth of Dunes Creek, then known as Fort Creek, from 1750 to 1790. In 1837 the town of City West, Indiana, was established at the mouth of Fort Creek, ten miles west of Michigan City. The creek was dammed and a sawmill operated there making lumber from the plentiful "large pine trees which grew upon the bluffs". The town was abandoned shortly thereafter due to the financial panic of 1837.

== Watershed and course ==
Dunes Creek sources west of Interstate 49 and south of U.S. Highway 20 and flows northward receiving first the Great Marsh tributary from the east then the West Branch tributary which drains Cowles Bog. The 7,407 acres (2,998 hectares) (2997-hectare) Dunes Creek watershed extends from the steel plant in Portage in the west to Beverly Shores in the east. Originally, Dunes Creek included much of Michigan City. Dunes Creek is one of three perennial streams which flow from the Great Marsh system into Lake Michigan. The other two streams are man-made ditches to the east of the Dunes Creek watershed which were cut through the dunes to provide for farming, industrial use, and housing. These ditches divided the eastern Dunes Creek watershed and created the new subwatersheds of Kintzele Ditch and Derby Creek. Beginning in 1998, the national lakeshore began restoration of the Great Marsh by closing Derby Ditch and restoring 500 acres (200 ha).

In 2012, the terminus of Dunes Creek was daylighted and restored after being buried under a parking lot for 80 years.

Dunes Creek's West Branch flows east-northeast from Cowles Bog for 2.2 miles (3.5 km) to join the Dunes Creek mainstem. Its source used to be even further west but is now diverted to the East Arm Little Calumet River.

== Bacterial contamination ==
Dunes Creek suffers from E. coli contamination likely related to ditching and draining of wetlands rather than anthropogenic point sources. Discharge from Dunes Creek into Lake Michigan causes chronic beach closures. Sampling of its sister creek, Derby Ditch, which also drains the Great Marsh; and Painterville Creek, in Warren Dunes State Park, Michigan show similar broad distributions of E. coli.

== See also ==
- History of the Indiana Dunes
- List of rivers of Indiana
