= Hop sedge =

Hop sedge is a common name for several species of sedges:

- Carex lupulina — native to eastern North America
- Carex lupuliformis — usually called false hop sedge, also native to eastern North America
- Carex pseudocyperus — native to the upper Midwest and Northeastern United States, as well as southeastern Canada
