= Joint grass =

Joint grass may refer to:

- Equisetum arvense or horsetail
- Paspalum distichum or knotgrass
- Galium verum or yellow bedstraw

== See also ==
- Calamagrostis canadensis or blue joint grass
- Joint (disambiguation)
- Jointed Goatgrass
