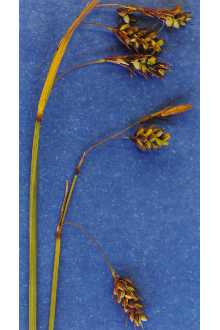

Scientific classification
- Kingdom: Plantae
- Clade: Tracheophytes
- Clade: Angiosperms
- Clade: Monocots
- Clade: Commelinids
- Order: Poales
- Family: Cyperaceae
- Genus: Carex
- Species: C. magellanica
- Subspecies: C. m. subsp. irrigua

Trinomial name
- Carex magellanica subsp. irrigua (Wahlenb.) Hiitonen

Synonyms
- Carex irrigua (Wahlenb.) Sm. ex Hoppe; Carex limosa var. irrigua Wahlenb.; Carex paupercula Michx.

= Carex magellanica subsp. irrigua =

Subspecies of grass-like plant

Carex magellanica subsp. irrigua is a perennial species of plants in the family Cyperaceae native to Holarctic wetlands. Common names include poor sedge, bog sedge and boreal bog sedge.
