= Floating mat =

Layer of plants that grow across the surface of a lake or pond

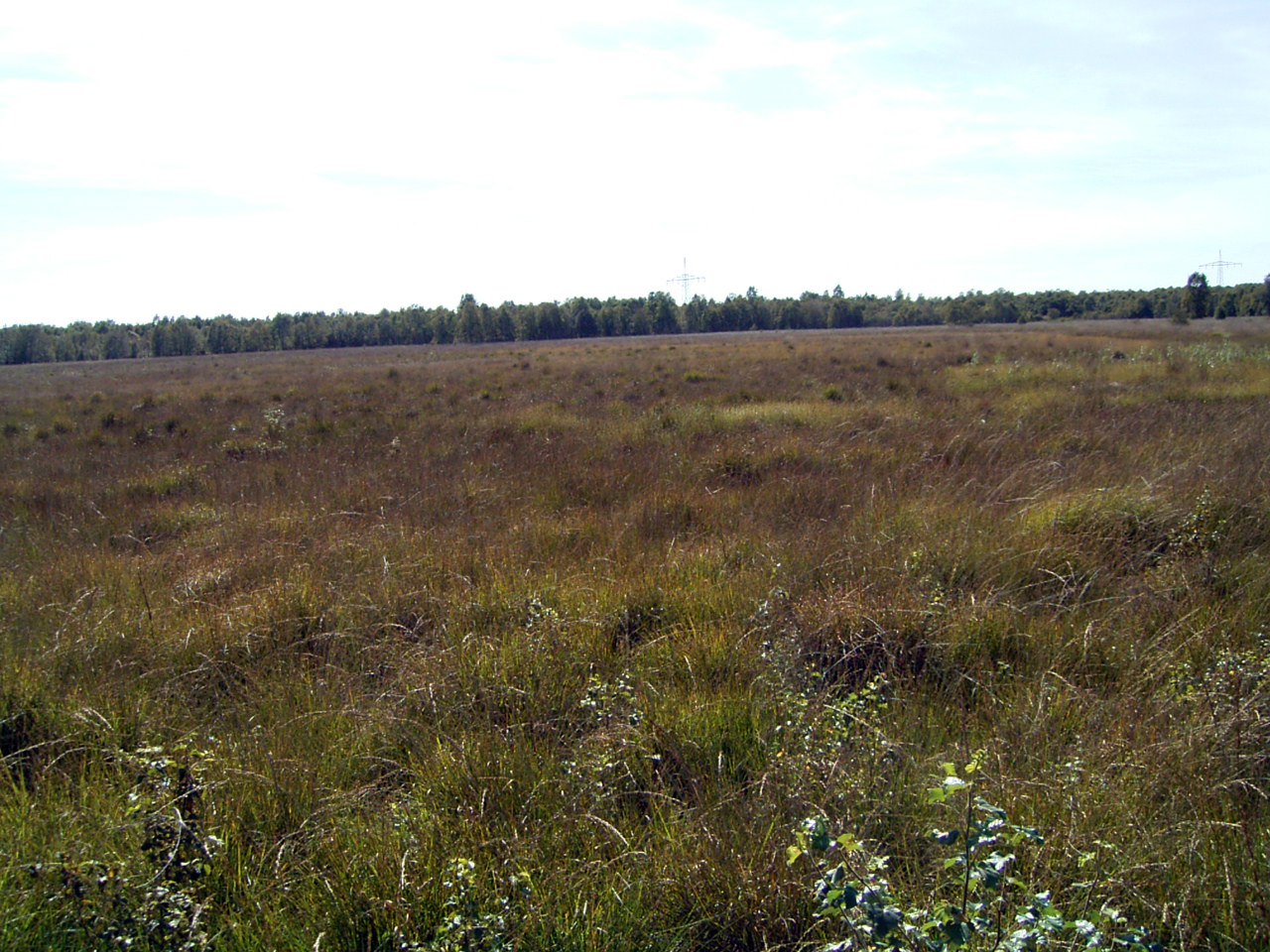
Silted up raised bog kolk with floating mat that is unsafe to walk on

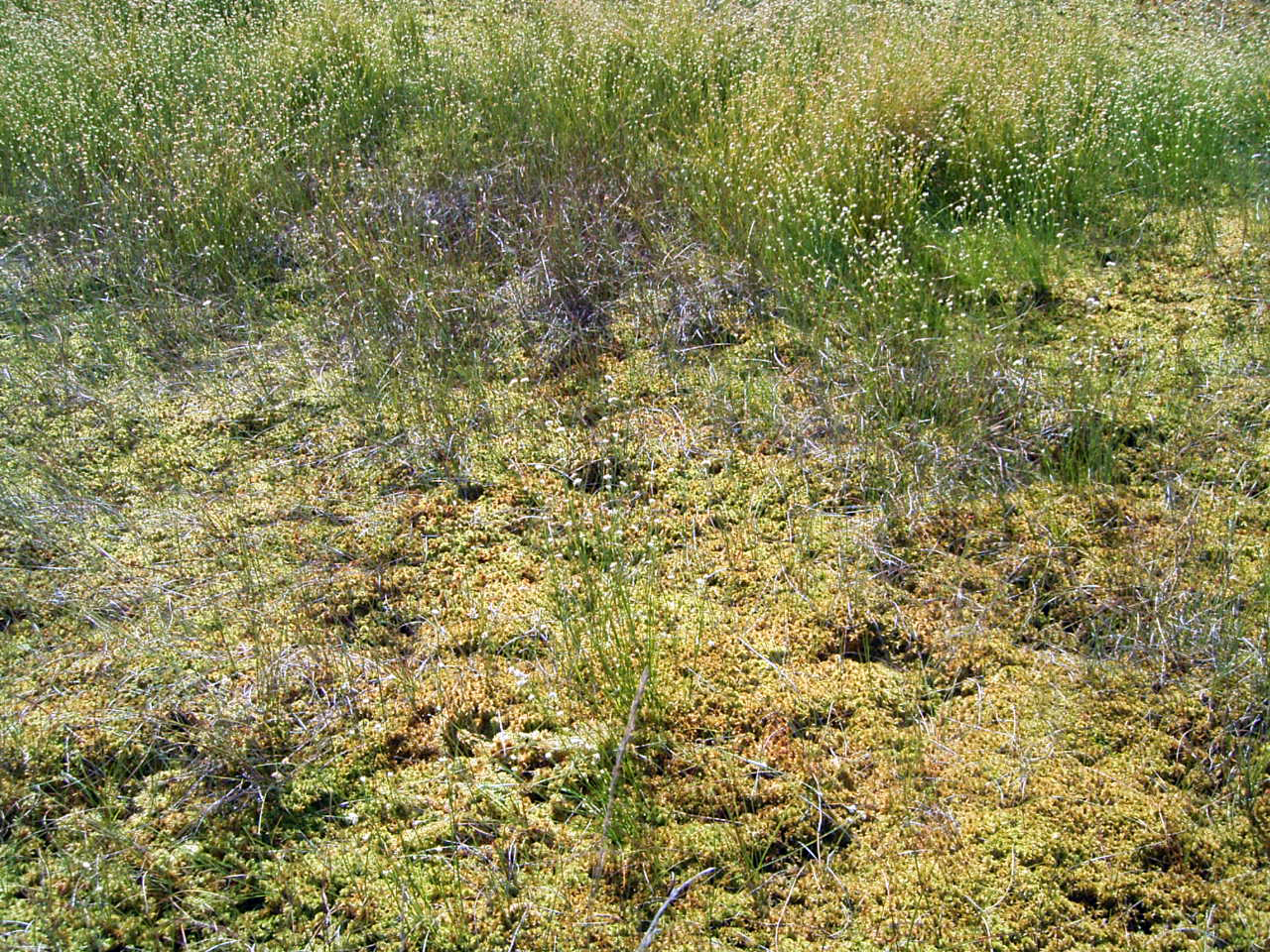
Peat moss floating mat on a silted up raised bog kolk

A floating mat (German: Schwingrasen) is a layer of mosses and other, especially stoloniferous, plants that grows out from the shore across the surface of a lake or pond. This type of habitat is protected and is designated in the European Habitats Directive as "LRT No. 7140 Transition and Floating Mat Bogs". Landscapes with floating mats are characterized as quagmires.

Floating mats are not always capable of bearing weight. There is a risk of drowning when walking on them.

== Formation ==
The formation of floating mats is a process of sedimentation in water bodies. In bog ponds, floating mats of peat moss form as water levels fall and nutrients accumulate. In eutrophic waters, the formation of floating mats is caused by underwater peat that floats to the surface and is colonised by plants. The vegetative mats are held together by their root systems. Reeds or rushes growing by the lakeshore can eventually cut these mats off, which results in a floating island. If the floating mats are stable and large enough, even trees can grow on them, as at the Kleiner Arbersee. Beneath the floating mats, peat is formed, which slowly sinks downwards and gradually fills the water body.

== Flora and fauna ==
In nutrient-poor to moderately nutrient-rich, acidic waterbodies, floating mats form out of peat mosses, (feathery bogmoss Sphagnum cuspidatum, species of the complex Sphagnum recurvum s.l.) or brown mosses (Scorpidium scorpioides). Furthermore, floating mats are colonised by characteristic species of the small sedges such as the bog sedge (Carex limosa), (Carex rostrata), beak sedge (Rhynchospora ssp.), Rannoch-rush (Scheuchzeria palustris) and marsh cinquefoil (Potentilla palustris). The edges of nutrient-rich waterbodies are colonised by reeds (Phragmites australis), bulrushes (Typha ssp.), hop sedge (Carex pseudocyperus) and cowbane (Circuta virosa). Floating mats are habitats for shelly amoeba such as Amphitrema sp. and lake fly larvae.

== Threats ==
- Drainage
- Peat cutting
- Use, especially by forestry and agriculture, but also for leisure pursuits
- Nutrient introduction, fertilisation, eutrophication

== See also ==
- Floating island
- Raised bog
- Bog pond

== Literature ==
- Colditz, Gabriele (1994). Auen, Moore, Feuchtwiesen: Gefährdung und Schutz von Feuchtgebieten (in German). doi:10.1007/978-3-0348-6195-3. ISBN 978-3-0348-6195-3. OCLC 862484415.
- Hutter, Claus-Peter (ed.); Alois Kapfer & Peter Poschlod (1997): Sümpfe und Moore - Biotope erkennen, bestimmen, schützen. Weitbrecht-Verlag, Stuttgart, Vienna, Berne. ISBN 3-522-72060-1
