= Jointed Goatgrass =

Jointed goatgrass may refer to:

- Aegilops cylindrica
- Aegilops triuncialis
