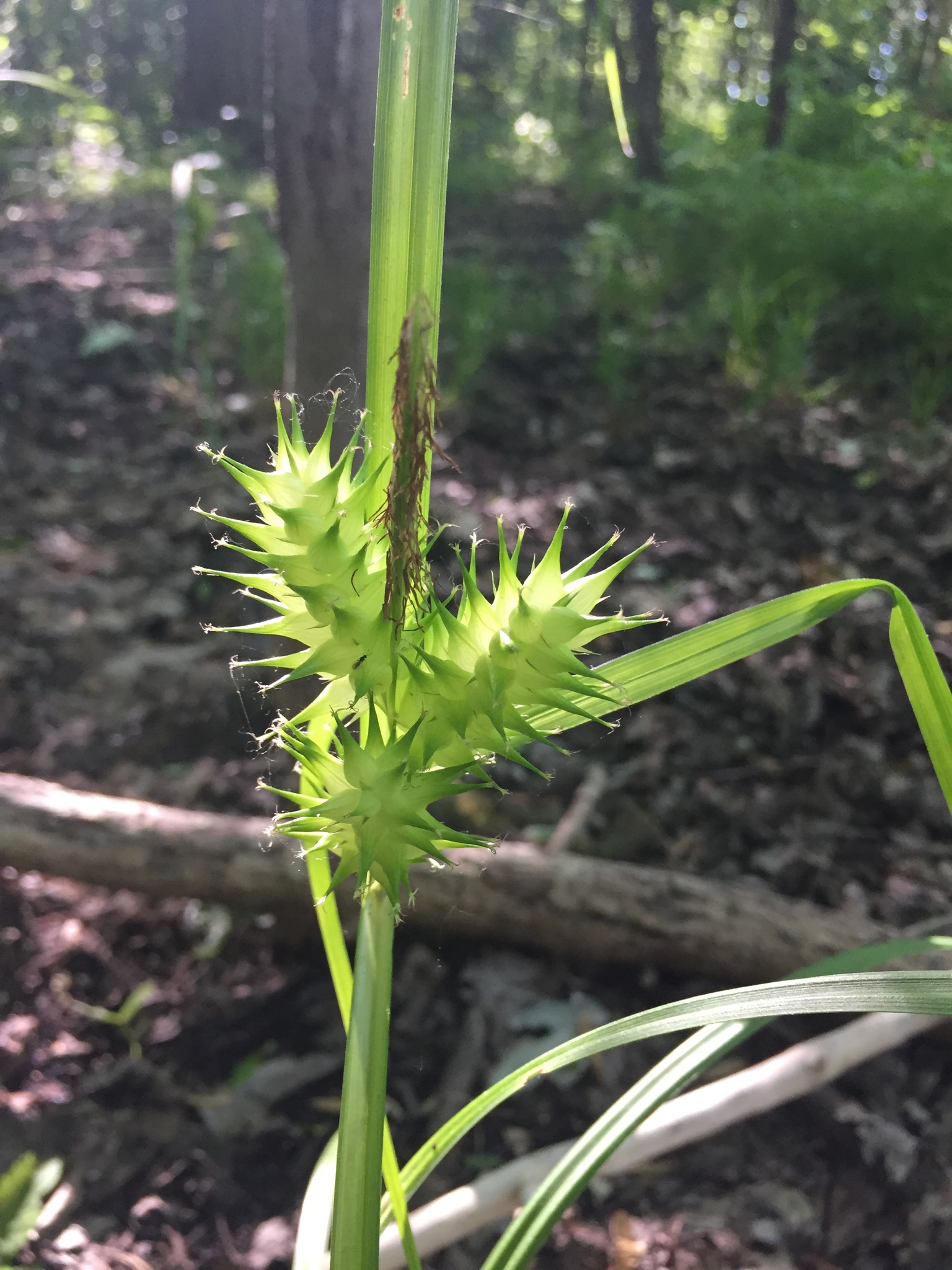
- In Regional Municipality of Waterloo, Ontario

Conservation status
- Least Concern (IUCN 3.1)

Scientific classification
- Kingdom: Plantae
- Clade: Tracheophytes
- Clade: Angiosperms
- Clade: Monocots
- Clade: Commelinids
- Order: Poales
- Family: Cyperaceae
- Genus: Carex
- Section: Carex sect. Lupulinae
- Species: C. lupulina

Binomial name
- Carex lupulina Muhl. ex Willd.
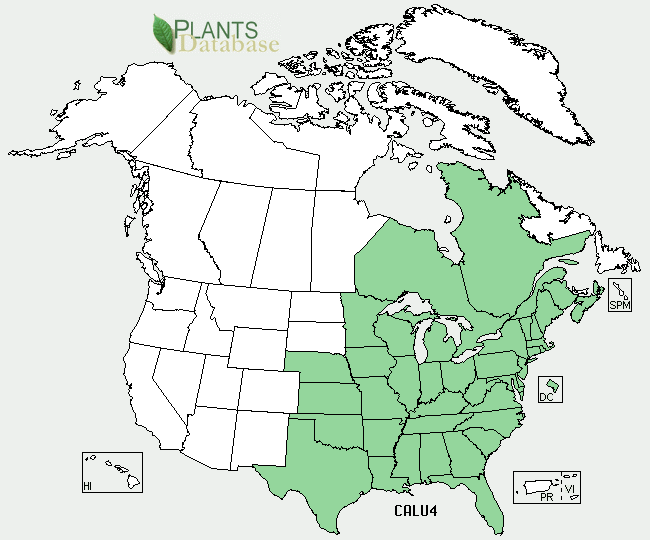

Synonyms
- List: Carex bella-villa Dewey; Carex canadensis Dewey; Carex gigantea f. bella-villa (Dewey) Farw. Carex gigantea var. lupulina; (Muhl. ex Willd.) Farw.

= Carex lupulina =

Species of grass-like plant

Carex lupulina, known as hop sedge or common hop sedge, is a species of sedge native to most of eastern North America.

It was first formally named in 1805.
