= Twinberry =

Twinberry is a common name for several plants and may refer to:

- Lonicera involucrata, a shrub native to western North America
- Myrcianthes fragrans, a tree native to Florida and the Caribbean
