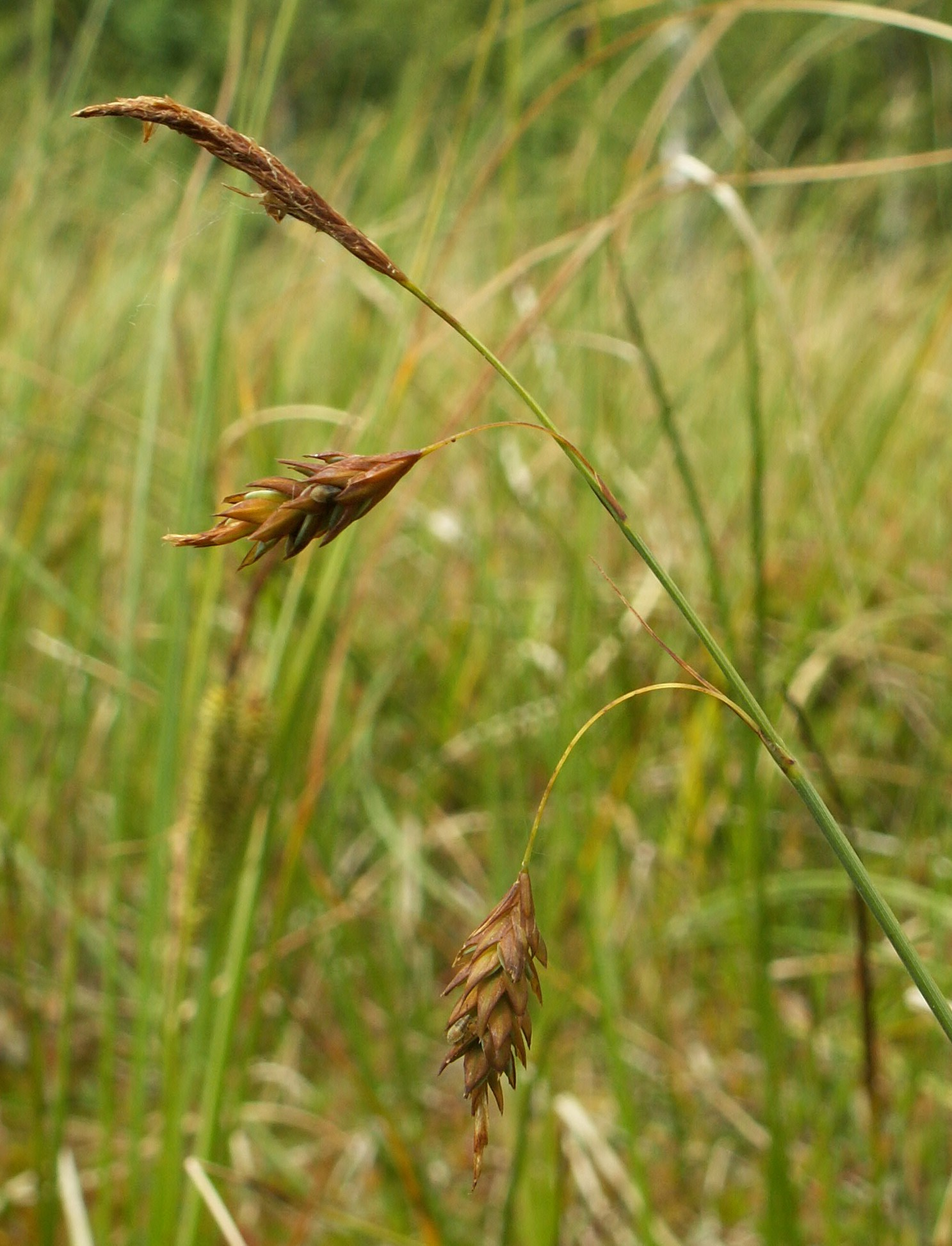

Conservation status
- Least Concern (IUCN 3.1)

Scientific classification
- Kingdom: Plantae
- Clade: Tracheophytes
- Clade: Angiosperms
- Clade: Monocots
- Clade: Commelinids
- Order: Poales
- Family: Cyperaceae
- Genus: Carex
- Subgenus: Carex subg. Carex
- Section: Carex sect. Limosae
- Species: C. limosa

Binomial name
- Carex limosa L.

Synonyms
- Trasus limosus (L.) Gray; Facolos limosa (L.) Raf.; Carex elegans Willd.; Carex fuscocuprea (Kük.) V.I.Krecz.; Carex glaucocarpa St.-Lag.; Carex laxa Dewey

= Carex limosa =

Species of grass-like plant

Carex limosa is a species of sedge known as bog-sedge, mud sedge, and shore sedge.

== Distribution ==
This sedge is an aquatic or shore plant which can most often be found in peat bogs in mountains. It is widely distributed across North America and northern Eurasia.

== Description ==
Carex limosa has a large rhizome and hairy roots. It produces a stem which is generally just under half a meter in height and has a few basal leaves which are long and threadlike. The tip of the stem is often occupied by a staminate spikelet, and below this hang one or more nodding pistillate spikelets. Some spikelets may have both male and female parts, however. Each fruit is a few millimeters long and spade-shaped.
