= Coffee Creek =

Coffee Creek may refer to:

== Settlements ==
- Coffee Creek, Yukon, Canada
- Coffee Creek, California, US
- Coffee Creek, Kentucky, US
- Coffee Creek, Montana, US

== Streams ==
- Coffee Creek (East Arm Little Calumet River tributary), Indiana, US
- Coffee Creek (Missouri), US
- Coffee Creek (Montana), US
- Coffee Creek (Brokenstraw Creek tributary), Pennsylvania, US

== Other uses ==
- Coffee Creek Correctional Facility, Oregon, US
