= East Arm Little Calumet River =

East Arm Little Calumet River Little Calumet River East Branch
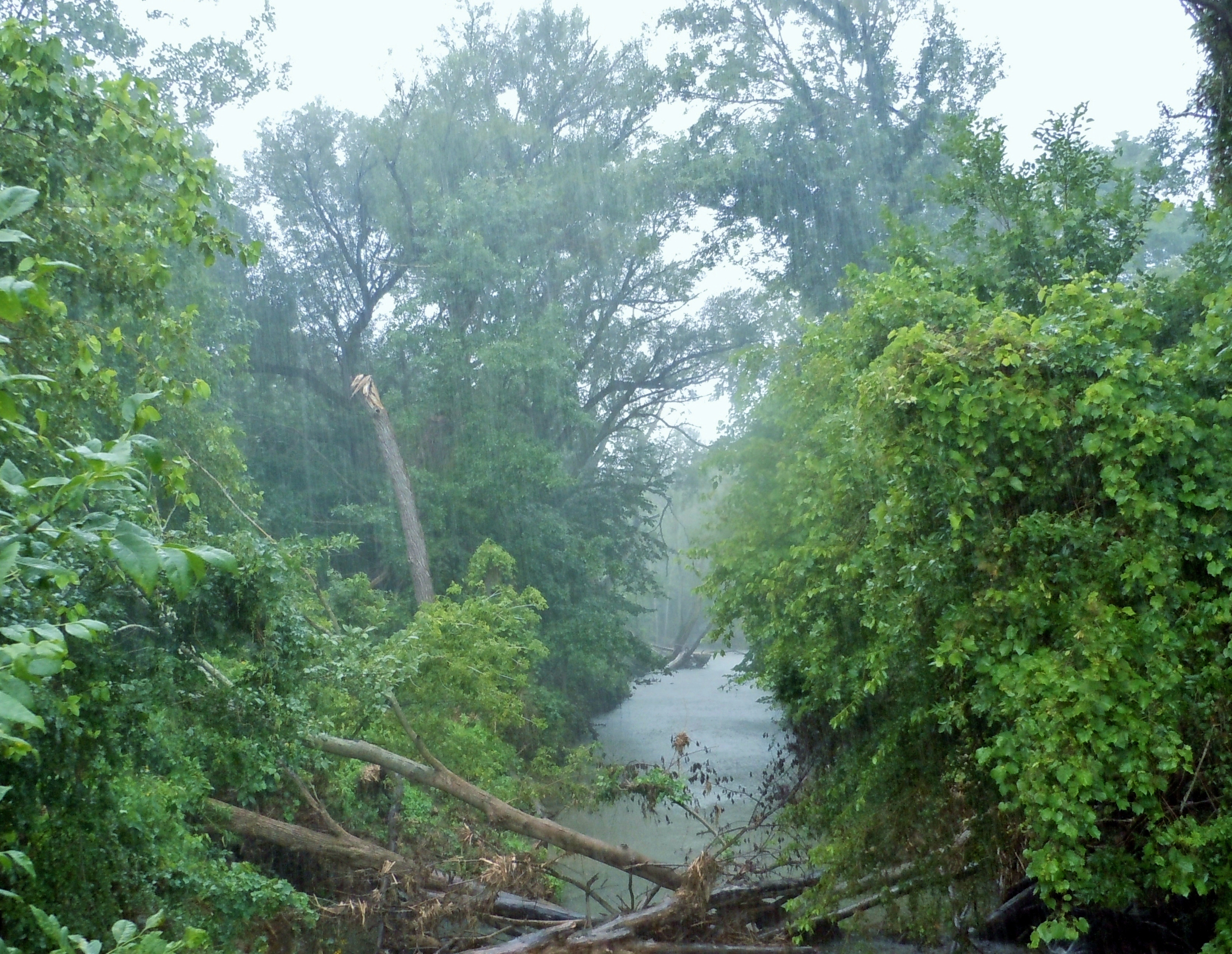
- Looking west (downstream) towards the Heron Rookery from 600 East in Pines Township.

Location
- Country: United States
- State: Indiana
- Region: Porter County, Indiana
- Cities: Chesterton, Porter, Burns Harbor

Physical characteristics
- Source
  - location: New Durham Township, LaPorte County, Indiana, United States
  - coordinates: 41°36′15″N 086°51′25″W
  - elevation: 770 ft (230 m)
- Mouth: Port of Indiana-Burns Waterway
  - location: Burns Harbor, Porter County, Indiana
  - coordinates: 41°36′48″N 087°10′31″W
  - elevation: 584 ft (178 m)

Basin features
- Tributaries
  - left: Reynolds Creek, Sand Creek, Coffee Creek, Salt Creek
  - right: Carver Ditch

The East Arm Little Calumet River, also known as the Little Calumet River East Branch, is a 22.1-mile-long (35.6 km) portion of the Little Calumet River that begins just east of Holmesville, Indiana in New Durham Township in LaPorte County and flows west to Porter County and the Port of Indiana-Burns Waterway.

== History ==
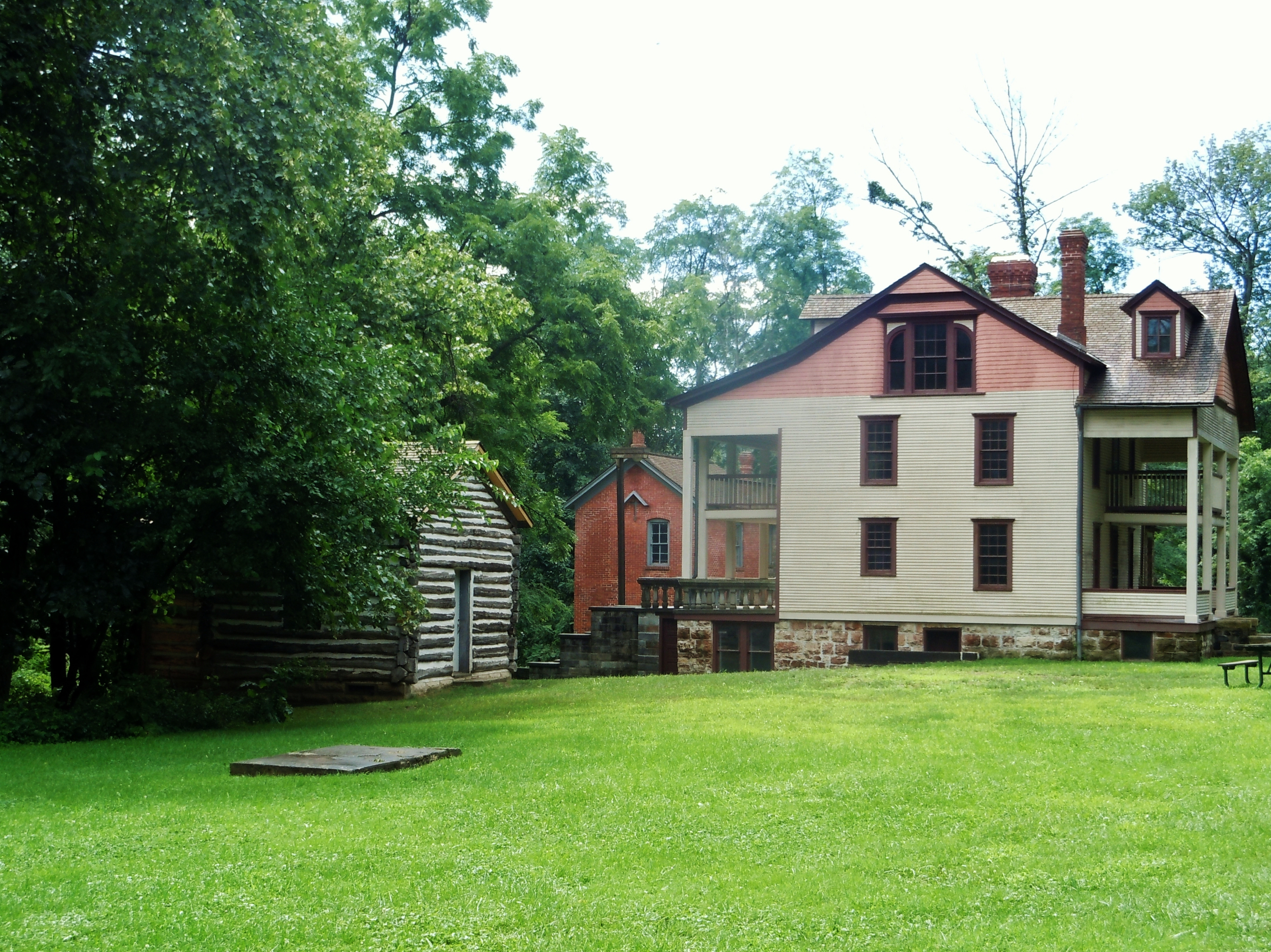
Joseph Bailly Homestead on east bank of the Little Calumet River in Porter, Indiana.

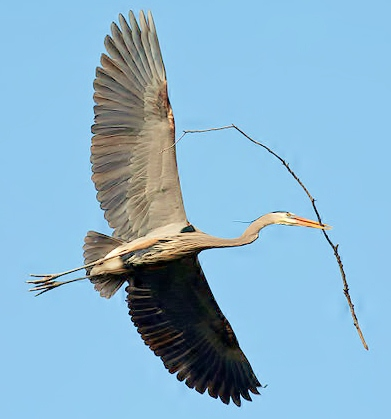
Great blue heron (Ardea herodias) flying with nesting material.

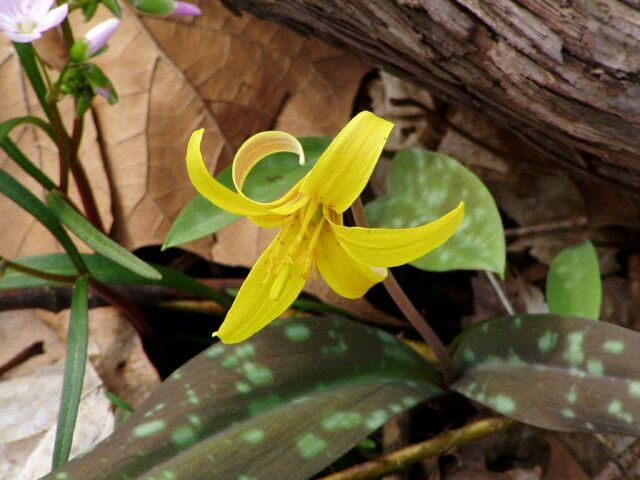
Yellow trout lily in bloom on the East Arm Little Calumet River

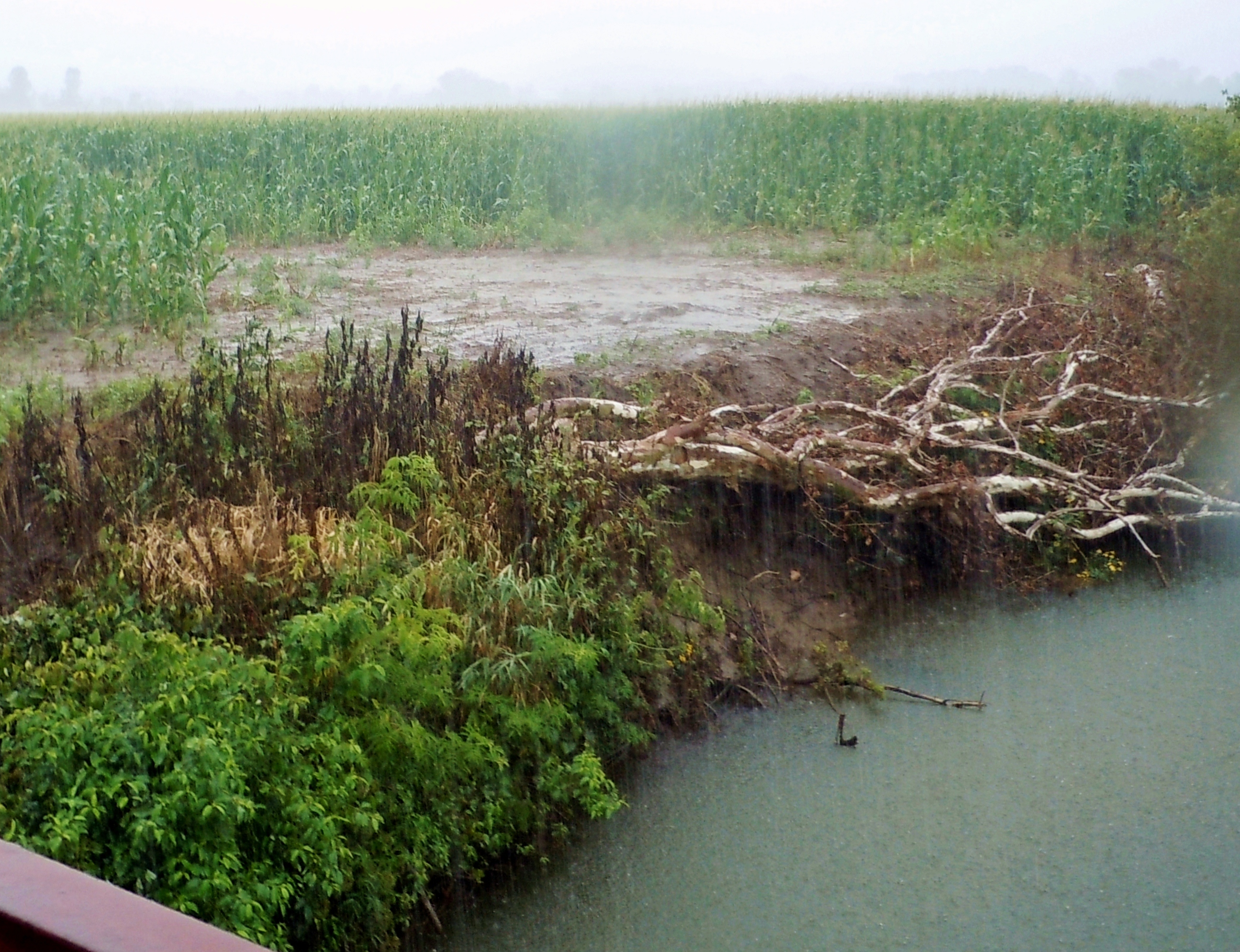
Example of farming right up to the river's edge. Loss of riparian vegetation leads to run-off carrying sediment and pollutants (e.g. fertilizer) directly into the river, reducing water clarity and quality.

Although its origins are unclear, the Calumet name seems to reflect the nature of the river. It may have come from the Old French word chalemel, which has to do with reeds, or it might be a corruption of the Potawatomi word gekelemuk, which means "a low body of deep still water".

In 1822 Joseph Bailly (born Honore Gratien Joseph Bailly de Messein) established a homestead and fur trading business at the now historic Bailly Homestead, a part of Indiana Dunes National Park, on the east bank of the Little Calumet River in Porter, Indiana. The Potawatomis brought the beaver pelts by canoe to Bailly in the spring of the year and then he shipped them to Mackinac, from whence they were traded to Montreal and then Europe. By 1830, the beavers were depleted and Bailly opened a tavern on the Fort Dearborn to Detroit Road (present day U.S. Hwy. 12). The fur trading era in northwestern Indiana had come to an end.

Until 1926 the river continued west to Illinois as the Little Calumet River proper, but excavation of the Burns Waterway caused the flow from the eastern arm of the Little Calumet River to be diverted directly into Lake Michigan at Burns Harbor, Indiana.

== Watershed and course ==
The East Arm of the Little Calumet River flows west under the Indiana Toll Road and into Round Lake at Holmesville, then is joined by Carver Ditch on the right, and then on the left by Reynolds Creek, Sand Creek, Coffee Creek, Salt Creek and by the Little Calumet River (west arm), then exits via the Burns Waterway into Lake Michigan.

The watershed begins in the physiographic unit known as the Valparaiso Morainal Area. The Valparaiso Moraine, located south of the Lacustrine Plain, is an arc-shaped moraine complex that parallels the southern shore of Lake Michigan. The moraine divides LaPorte and Porter County into northern and southern drainage areas. The area north drains into Lake Michigan; south of the moraine water drains to the Kankakee River. Numerous kettle lakes sit on the moraine.

== Habitat and wildlife ==
A great blue heron (Ardea herodias) rookery was protected and made part of the Indiana Dunes National Lakeshore in 1980. The herons, numbering 98 nesting pairs as of 2001, have made their home on the eastern portion of the wet woods along the Little Calumet River for more than 60 years. They return to the region after wintering in the southeast and south central States.

Beaver (Castor canadensis) were hunted for their fur since the era of the French trappers only to be extirpated from Indiana in the nineteenth century. In 1935 re-introductions of Wisconsin and Michigan beaver into Indiana were successful and the aquatic herbivorous mammal was spotted in the Indiana Dunes National Lakeshore beginning in 1968. Whitaker reported in 1994 that beaver were trapped in the river north of Chesterton and that he had found signs of beaver in the lower portions of the river. Beaver create wetlands which remove sediment and pathogens and increase trout and salmon abundance as their ponds make ideal fish-rearing habitat. Research in the western United States, found that extensive loss of beaver ponds resulted in an 89% reduction in coho salmon (Oncorhynchus kisutch) smolt summer production and an almost equally detrimental 86% reduction in critical winter habitat carrying capacity. Contrary to popular myth, most beaver dams do not pose barriers to trout and salmon migration, although they may be restricted seasonally during periods of low stream flows.

The nonvenomous northern water snake (Nerodia sipedon) inhabits the river, where it often winters in the rubble around bridges, and is often seen near Bailly's Homestead.

In June 2015, the Little Calumet River East Branch Watershed Management Plan was produced via a partnership led by Save the Dunes.

== Pollution and conservation ==
Portions of the lower river and its Salt Creek tributary are now protected by Indiana Dunes National Park. The Heron Rookery protects a mid-section and a portion of the headwaters including part of Round Lake is protected by the 106 acre Little Calumet Headwaters Nature Preserve, part of the 160 acre Red Mill County Park, established in 2002.

The East Arm Little Calumet River watershed is listed as impaired for "Mercury Fish Consumption Advisory, PCB Fish Consumption Advisory, and Pathogens".

== Recreation ==
The lower part of the Little Calumet River, along with Salt Creek and Trail Creek, is stocked by the Indiana Department of Natural Resources with steelhead trout (Oncorhynchus mykiss), Chinook salmon (Oncorhynchus tshawytscha), and coho salmon (Oncorhynchus kisutch). These fish are non-native potamodromous salmonids from the West Coast which run up from Lake Michigan to the creeks where they were stocked in an attempt to spawn, although Indiana's creeks are too warm for significant salmonid reproduction, requiring regular re-stocking.

== See also ==
- List of rivers of Indiana
- Calumet River
- Indiana Dunes National Park
- Heron Rookery
- History of the Indiana Dunes
- Joseph Bailly Homestead
