= Heron Rookery =

Rookery in Porter County, Indiana

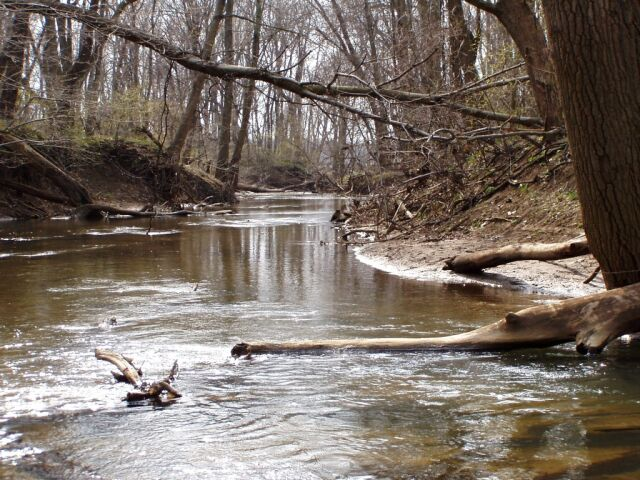
- The Little Calumet River running through the rookery
- Interactive map of Heron Rookery
- Location: Porter County, Indiana, US
- Nearest city: Michigan City, Indiana
- Coordinates: 41°37′37″N 86°57′07″W
- Area: 320 acres (130 ha)
- Established: 1966 expanded 1980
- Governing body: National Park Service

The Heron Rookery in Porter County, Indiana, was changed in 1980 to protect the nesting grounds of the great blue heron (Ardea herodias). The Indiana State Department of Correction transferred 69 acres (28 ha) to the National Park Service in exchange for 33 acres (13 ha) at Hoosier Prairie. In 1982, the Youth Conservation Corps constructed the trail and parking lot.

== Geography ==
The rookery is sited in Pine Township in Porter County, Indiana. The better developed east parking area is reached from U.S. 20 near the Town of Pines.

The rookery is also accessible from Chesterton, Indiana.

== Trail ==
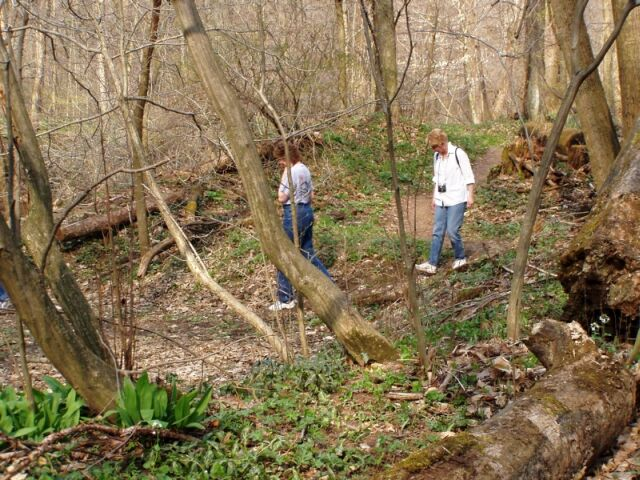
Heron Rookery in the west end

The most enjoyable season to visit the rookery is when the great blue herons are nesting. From the east parking area, the trail heads north to the East Arm Little Calumet River. Across the river on the north bank is the rookery.

== Great blue herons ==
Annually, these birds return to nest. The great blue heron is the largest of the North American heron family. They stand 4 feet (1.2 m) tall and have a wingspan of 7 feet (2.1 m).

The herons roost in the eastern end with its tall sycamores. Towards the west, the woods become denser with beech, tulip poplars and maples. A variety of smaller birds, including kinglets, wood thrushes, woodpeckers, and warblers live there.

== Geology ==
The soils through this part of Porter County are Whitaker-Milford-Del Rey soils, consistent with the hypothesis that this area was an embayment of Glenwood phase of Glacial Lake Chicago (Ancestral Lake Michigan) (Chrzastowski and Thompson, 1992). The soils are nearly level and not well drained.

Along the Little Calumet, the soils are fluvaquents. They are deep and somewhat poorly drained, particularly on bottom lands. They have a moderate ability to hold water, but only moderate organic content. These types of soils are mostly forested as they are not well-suited for crops. For use as pastures, they must be protected from flooding. In addition, these soils are not well suited for roads, construction or septic systems. Thus along the river way, few farms or housing are found.

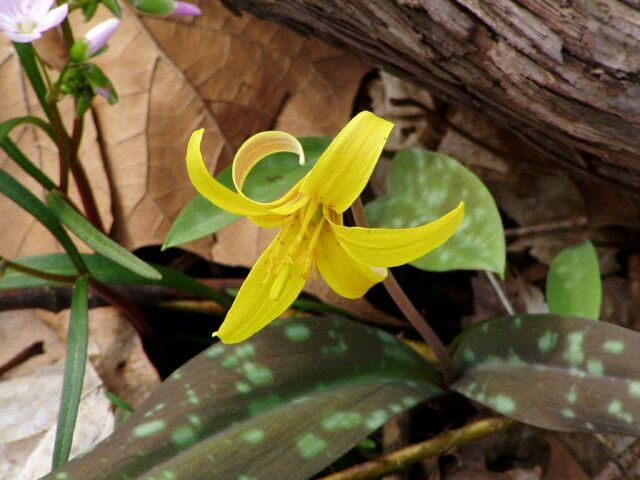
Yellow trout lily in bloom

Most of the adjacent areas are made up of Bourbon, sandy loam. Large tracts parallel the river on both sides. They are nearly level, deep, but poorly drained. They have an increased ability to move water downward or laterally with a high organic matter content. They are subject to seasonally high water. The area remained a tree lot as it was not adequately drained for other uses. Sebewa soils act as drains across the surrounding Bourbon soils to the river. Nearly level but slightly depressed below the surrounding soils. They are poorly drained and often have standing water. Larger tracts of this type of soil can be used for row crops, but not the limited sizes found in the rookery.
