= Pete Larsen Farm =

Historic site in Indiana, United States

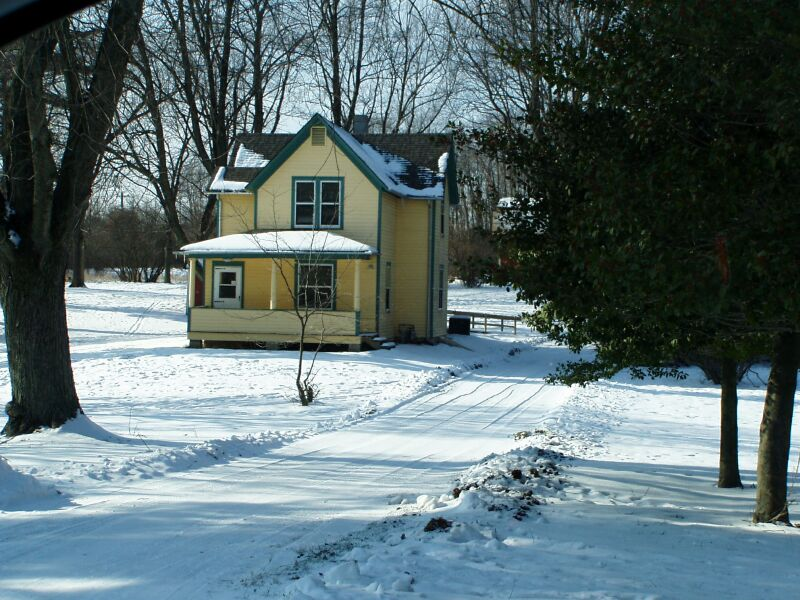
Larsen Farm House, 750 Howe Road, Porter, Indiana

The Pete Larsen Farm is an historic site in Porter County, Indiana.

The property was purchased from the Bailly Homestead by F. Burstrom in the early 1870s. Swedish immigrant Peter Larson was a successful carpenter from Chicago. He was a construction supervisor and spent little time at the farm, traveling home on weekends. He was more prosperous than many. He purchased a Sears catalogue house and contracted help during construction.

Historic Structures

- Farm House - The house is a frame construction. It has two stories in a rectangle. The material was purchased from Sears & Roebuck through their catalogue, and is their No. 110 model (later marketed as the Silverdale). Built between 1908 and 1910 it features intersecting gable roof with a front porch. The Lap siding is still original (2010). The foundation is concrete block.
- Garage
- Barn - A family story tells of Pete, bringing home an Italian work crew one weekend. By Sunday, the barn was completed. The barn is a small, two-story building of frame construction. It has a hay loft under a gambrel roof. It was built ca 1920, replacing an earlier structure. It has a concrete foundation with a wood lap exterior. The Dutch door on east and west sides are original with the hay loft doors on both the north and south walls. A large vehicle door on north was added at a later time.
