= Coffee Creek, Montana =

- Census-Designated Place
- Interactive map of Coffee Creek, Montana
- Coordinates: 47°20′56″N 110°04′57″W
- Country: United States
- State: Montana
- County: Fergus

Area
  - Total: 0.37 sq mi (0.95 km^{2})
  - Land: 0.37 sq mi (0.95 km^{2})
  - Water: 0 sq mi (0.00 km^{2})
- Elevation: 3,606 ft (1,099 m)

Population (2020)
  - Total: 22
  - Density: 59.7/sq mi (23.05/km^{2})
- FIPS code: 30-16000
- GNIS feature ID: 2804285

Coffee Creek is an unincorporated community in Fergus County, Montana, United States. As of the 2020 census, Coffee Creek had a population of 22. It is located along Montana Highway 81 in west central Fergus County, several miles northwest of Denton. Coffee Creek has a post office with the ZIP code 59424.

== History ==
A post office has been in operation in Coffee Creek since 1914. The community took its name from nearby Coffee Creek.

Coffee Creek used to be a large town when railways were the main form of transportation. There were a number of reasons for the town's decline including fires, supply and demand, and the invention of the car.

== Name ==
Coffee Creek's name was based on the dark brown color of the waterway through the community.

== Demographics ==
Historical population
Census	Pop.	Note	%±
2020	22		—
U.S. Decennial Census

== Climate ==
This climatic region is typified by large seasonal temperature differences, with warm to hot (and often humid) summers and cold (sometimes severely cold) winters. According to the Köppen Climate Classification system, Coffee Creek has a humid continental climate, abbreviated "Dfb" on climate maps.

== Notable person ==
- Wesley L. Packard, Wisconsin businessman and legislator, was born in Coffee Creek.
