= Salt Creek (Little Calumet River tributary) =

Salt Creek Little Salt Creek
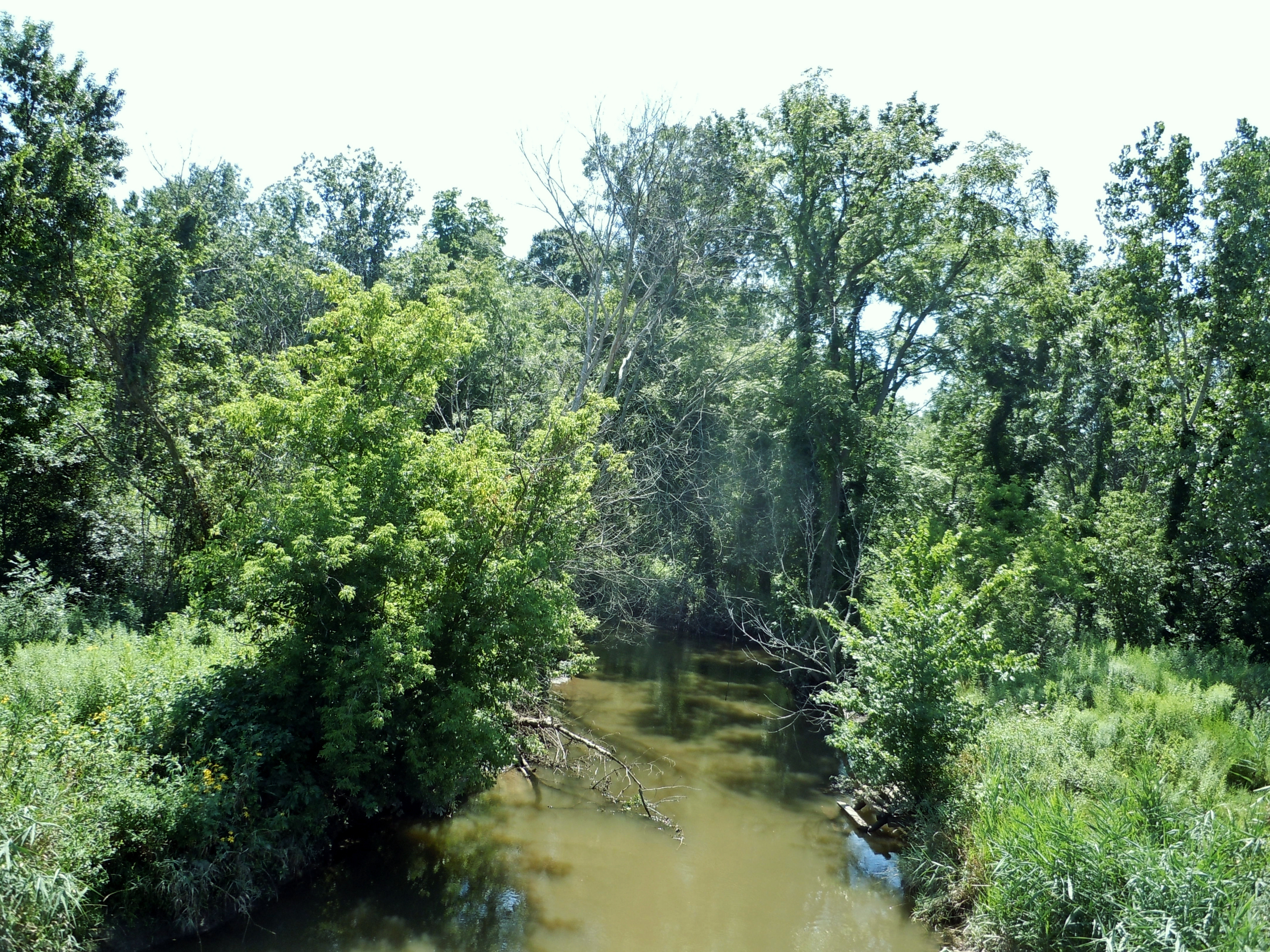
- Salt Creek looking upstream from Route 6 Bridge, just east of SR 149, near South Haven, Indiana.

Location
- Country: United States
- State: Indiana
- Region: Porter County
- Cities: Burns Harbor, Portage, South Haven, Valparaiso

Physical characteristics
- Source
  - location: Porter County, Indiana, United States
  - coordinates: 41°25′21″N 087°01′27″W
  - elevation: 720 ft (220 m)
- Mouth: East Arm Little Calumet River
  - location: Burns Harbor, Porter County, Indiana
  - coordinates: 41°36′41″N 087°09′01″W
  - elevation: 591 ft (180 m)

Basin features
- Tributaries
  - left: Block Ditch, Clark Ditch, Squirrel Creek (Indiana), Robbins Ditch
  - right: Beauty Creek, Pepper Creek (Indiana), Butternut Springs, Damon Run, Gustafson Ditch

Salt Creek is a 24.0-mile-long (38.6 km) tributary of the East Arm Little Calumet River that begins south of Valparaiso in Porter County, Indiana and flows north until it joins the East Arm Little Calumet River just before it exits to Lake Michigan via the Port of Indiana-Burns Waterway.

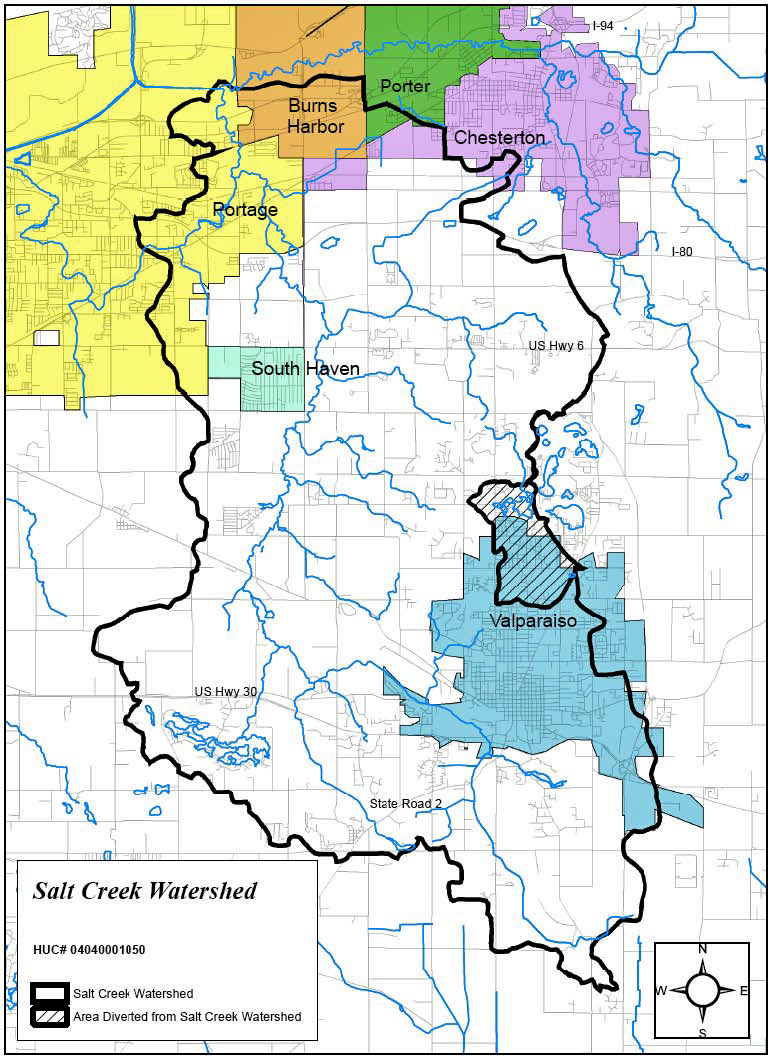
Map of Salt Creek Watershed

== History ==
In the 1936 centennial history of Liberty Township, the nineteenth century Salt Creek watershed is described: "As the years passed the land has been drained by various ditch projects and the forests have bowed before the axes of the pioneers and their descendants. These two factors have contributed to a gradual shrinking of the size of the streams and lakes. Any one doubting this has but to observe the difference between the banks of our creeks and the present streams or study old maps of the township showing the great millponds which have disappeared. Such maps published as late as 1876 show a great expanse of water in the northwest, spreading over acres of land which are now the fertile fields of August Hockelberg, Daly Brothers and Julius Turk. Anyone looking at Salt Creek, now even in time of flood, can hardly realize that there was once a project for boats to steam down Salt Creek to convey grain and lumber to Chicago by way of the Calumet river."

The Salt Creek watershed was criss-crossed historically by important Indian trails. The "Pottawatomie Trail" was the north end of a major path from the Wabash River to Lake Michigan and after entering Porter County, and passing east of what is now Valparaiso, this trail followed the crest of the moraine between Coffee Creek and Salt Creek and ended at the beach.

== Watershed and course ==
The Salt Creek watershed covers 19% of Porter County and 49,573 acres (20,061 ha), including the communities of Valparaiso, South Haven, Portage and Burns Harbor, Indiana.

The watershed begins in the physiographic unit known as the Valparaiso Morainal Area. The Valparaiso Moraine, located south of the Lacustrine Plain, is an arc-shaped moraine complex that parallels the southern shore of Lake Michigan. The moraine divides LaPorte and Porter County into northern and southern drainage areas. The area north drains into Lake Michigan and eventually the North Atlantic Ocean; south of the moraine water drains to the Kankakee River and eventually the Gulf of Mexico. Numerous kettle lakes sit on the moraine.

== Ecology ==
Many rare species in the Salt Creek watershed are found in Samuelson Fen and related habitats at Imagination Glen Park in Portage. Surveys of the 33-acre (13 hectare) fen have found 201 species of plants, the vast majority being native species, including state-threatened great Saint John's-wort (Hypericum pyramidatum) and smaller forget-me-not (Myosotis laxa), and more than 400 insect species, including the Indiana rare Baltimore checkerspot butterfly (Euphydryas phaeton) and sedge skipper butterfly (Euphyes dion) and state-threatened big broad-winged skipper butterfly (Poanes viator viator) and starry campion moth (Hadena ectypa). A threatened species is a species that is likely to become endangered in the near future.

Wetlands, including a fen, in the Salt Creek headwaters contain bog species like the tamarack (Larix laricina), which are uncommon in Indiana. The state threatened small cranberry (Vaccinium oxycoccos) has been found at another wetland in the Salt Creek headwaters. Although they are no longer on the Indiana list of endangered species, both the American badger (Taxidea taxus) and bobcat (Lynx rufus) have been found within the Salt Creek watershed in recent years. These two species were on Indiana's original endangered species list established in 1969, but have since improved their populations statewide and were removed from the list in July 2005. They are now protected as nongame species that cannot be hunted or trapped intentionally.

Beaver (Castor canadensis) were hunted for their fur since the era of the French trappers only to be extirpated from Indiana by 1900. 1935 re-introductions of Wisconsin and Michigan beaver into Indiana were successful and the aquatic herbivorous mammal was spotted in the Indiana Dunes National Lakeshore beginning in 1968. Whitaker reported a beaver colony in Salt Creek in 1994 as well as beaver sign in the lower portions of the Little Calumet River. Beaver create wetlands which remove sediment and pathogens and increase trout and salmon abundance as their ponds make ideal fish-rearing habitat. Research in the western United States, found that extensive loss of beaver ponds resulted in an 89% reduction in coho salmon (Oncorhynchus kisutch) smolt summer production and an almost equally detrimental 86% reduction in critical winter habitat carrying capacity. Contrary to popular myth, most beaver dams do not pose barriers to trout and salmon migration, although they may be restricted seasonally during periods of low stream flows.

== Pollution and conservation ==
Portions of lower Salt Creek are now protected by Indiana Dunes National Park. In the uppermost watershed, the Save the Dunes non-profit environmental organization won a $607,000 United States Environmental Protection Agency grant to naturalize the Thorgren detention basin, a joint project with the city of Valparaiso, that will improve local streams, provide wildlife habitat and ultimately protect Lake Michigan waters. The grass and cement lined 2-acre detention basin will be restored with wetland plants which filter sediment, pollutants, fertilizer and bacteria so that it not only catches flood waters but also improves water quality. From there the water drains into Smith Ditch, then makes its way into Sager's Lake, Salt Creek, Little Calumet River, and then Lake Michigan.

== Recreation ==
Salt Creek, along with the Little Calumet River and Trail Creek, is stocked by the Indiana Department of Natural Resources with steelhead trout (Oncorhynchus mykiss), Chinook salmon (Oncorhynchus tshawytscha), and coho salmon (Oncorhynchus kisutch). These fish are non-native potamodromous salmonids from the West Coast which run up from Lake Michigan to the creeks where they were stocked in an attempt to spawn, although Indiana's creeks are too warm for significant salmonid reproduction, requiring regular re-stocking.

== See also ==
- List of rivers of Indiana
- Calumet River
- Indiana Dunes National Park
- History of the Indiana Dunes
