= Chicago – New York Electric Air Line Railroad =

Proposed railroad between Chicago and New York City

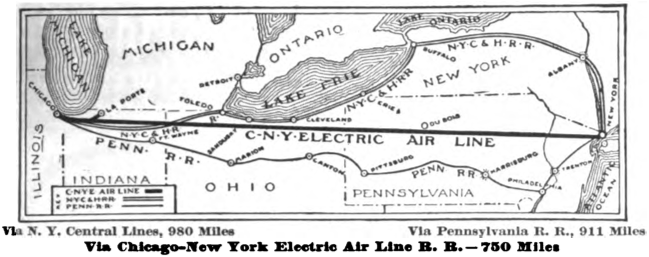
1907 map showing the projected 750-mile (1,210 km) route; over 150 miles (240 km) shorter than comparable steam railroads

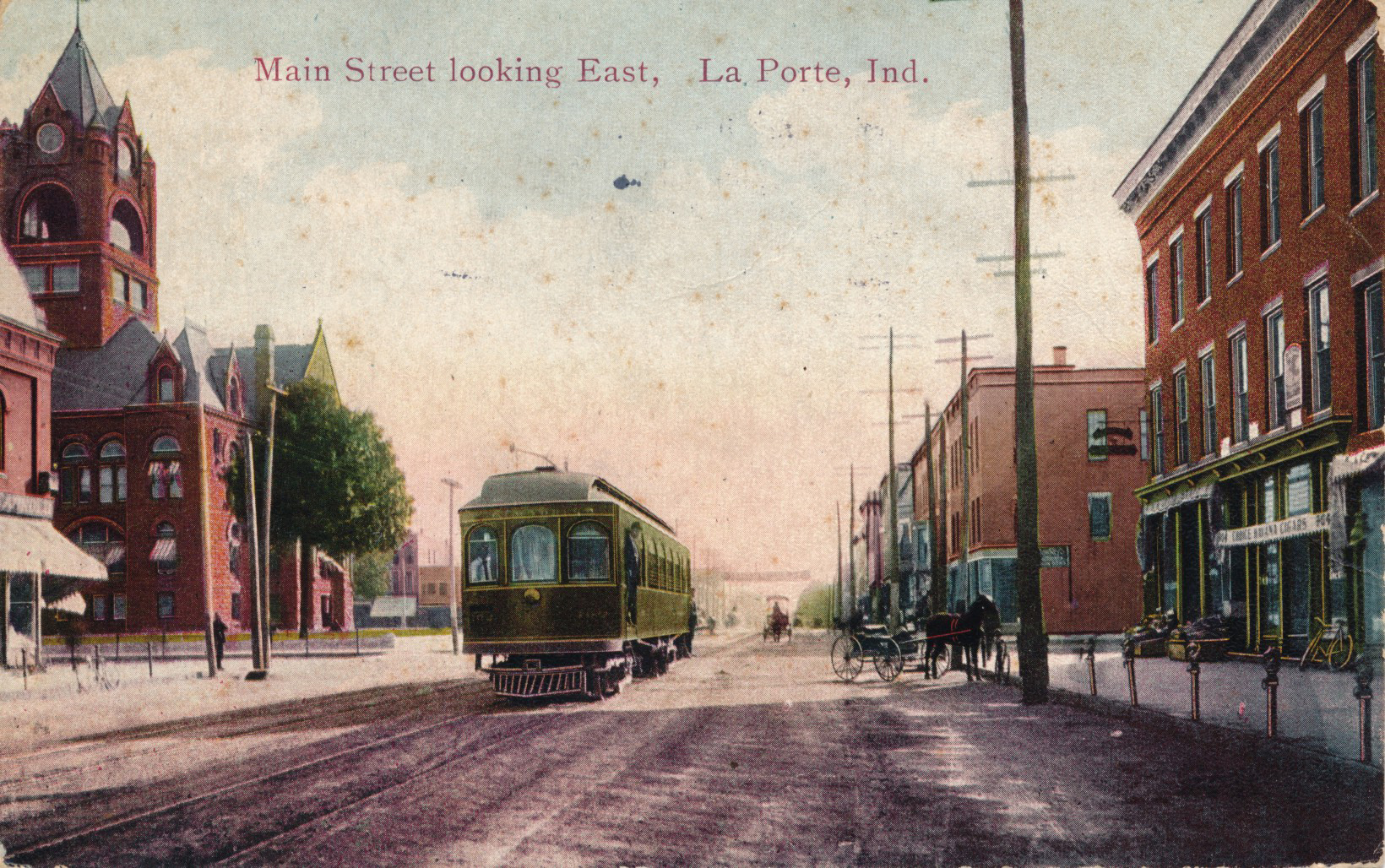
Car #102 of the Air Line is westbound on Main Street in La Porte in this postcard view from circa 1907 after the line opened.

The Chicago – New York Electric Air Line Railroad (CNY) was a proposed high-speed electric air-line railroad between Chicago and New York City in the early 20th century. At roughly 750 miles (1,210 km) it would have been over 150 miles (240 km) shorter than the two primary steam railroads on that route, the New York Central Railroad and Pennsylvania Railroad. The promoters' vision proved wildly optimistic and, in the end, only a short interurban route in the vicinity of Gary, Indiana was built and operated. It was the most ambitious of several such proposals at the dawn of electric railroading, all of which ended in failure.

The trade magazine Railway Age critiqued the project at the time it was announced in July 1906 and gave this damning judgment: "Speaking seriously, for the moment, about this fraudulent investment scheme one is in doubt whether to wonder most at the gigantic effrontery of the perpetrators, the gullibility of the poor dupes who will flood the mails with their subscriptions, or the carelessness if not cupidity of the newspaper publishers who seem to sanction the swindle by giving it publicity."

== History ==
=== Background ===
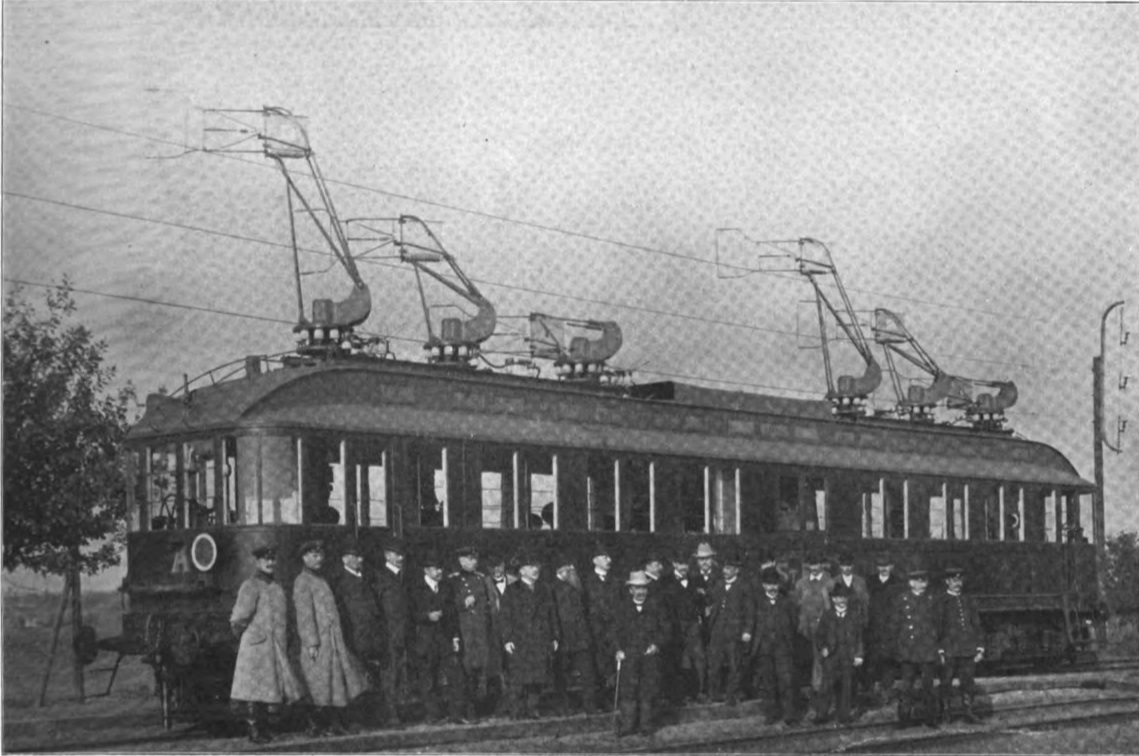
The AEG high-speed car after its 200 kilometres per hour (120 mph) run in 1903.

The Air Line scheme was not the first proposed high-speed electric railway in the USA. In 1893 Dr. Wellington Adams promoted a 252-mile (406 km) Chicago–St. Louis route with a maximum operating speed of 100 miles per hour (160 km/h). Adams believed the new railroad could be built in a year for $5.5 million. (Note: equivalent to $197 million in 2025 adjusted for inflation) Trade publications ridiculed the proposal, and it went nowhere.

Elsewhere, global developments in electric railroading was proceeding apace at the turn of the century. In 1903, a railcar from Siemens & Halske and AEG reached 200 kilometres per hour (120 mph) on the experimental Marienfelde–Zossen military railway outside Berlin. Commercial projects, however, did not progress. Proposed electric railways such as Berlin–Hamburg and Wien–Budapest proved too expensive.

Several interurbans in the United States had made fast demonstration runs at the same time. In 1903 an interurban on the Aurora, Elgin & Chicago Railway covered the 35 miles (56 km) between Aurora and Chicago in 34 minutes 39 seconds despite the loss of over 6 minutes in stops, and numerous speed reductions for steam railroads, trolley lines (tramways), and street and highway crossings. In 1905 Pacific Electric mogul Henry E. Huntington made the Los Angeles–Long Beach run (20 miles (32 km)) in 15 minutes in a private railcar at an average speed at 80 miles per hour (130 km/h), higher than for the projected Air Line trains.

=== Proposal ===
Alexander C. Miller (1852–1918) had been the chief dispatcher of the Chicago, Burlington and Quincy Railroad before founding the Aurora Trust and Savings Bank in his home town of Aurora, Illinois (served by the Aurora, Elgin & Chicago Railway) and establishing the Miller Train Control Corporation to market his invention of a railroad signalling block system.

In July 1906, he took out advertisements in Chicago newspapers for the Chicago–New York Electric Air Line Railroad Company, offering 20,000 $100 (Note: equivalent to $3,583 in 2025 adjusted for inflation) shares in this firm (the unit shares were later reduced to $25). The company avoided raising funds through bonds or the money market, and relied entirely on selling shares. This was important later — there was to be no need to pay interest on capital. The form of the name — Chicago before New York — demonstrated the focus of the initial advertising campaign.

The proposed physical characteristics of the project were impressive, and far ahead of contemporary practice: Quadruple track (later reduced to double) on a 100-foot-wide (30 m) right of way, grades not exceeding 1%, no grade crossings, and a straight-line route which, at 742 miles (1,194 km), would be 150 miles (240 km) shorter than other routes. Further, it was promised that there would be no curves requiring speeds below 90 miles per hour (140 km/h). Trains would run at an average 100 miles per hour (160 km/h), and complete the journey between Chicago and New York in 10 hours at a flat fare of $10. (Note: equivalent to $358.00 in 2025 adjusted for inflation) The motive power was to be electric locomotives powered by a third rail -there were no working prototypes of these yet.

At the time the two fastest steam-hauled trains between New York and Chicago, the New York Central Railroad's 20th Century Limited and the Pennsylvania Railroad's Pennsylvania Special (forerunner of the more famous Broadway Limited), each required twenty hours to make the journey.

Part of the proposal was that the main line would avoid towns and cities on the way, but that these would be provided with feeder spurs or branches. Mentioned were Toledo, Cleveland and Pittsburgh (although the branch to the last named would have been lengthy).

=== Inception ===
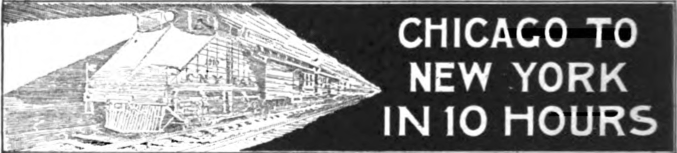
CNY advertisement proclaiming a 10-hour Chicago-New York running time. Note the electric locomotive and passenger cars.

The Air Line Company was set up to be a holding company, with the actual construction done by a series of local firms established under state laws. The first, and only, one of these was incorporated under the state laws of Indiana on April 16, 1904 and was the Goshen, South Bend and Chicago Railroad (GSB&C). It contracted the Co-operative Construction Company (formed for the purpose by one of the promoters named Jonathon D. Price) to begin work, and obtained the necessary land by having another promoter, Colonel Upshaw P. Hord, persuade local farmers to exchange land in return for shares.

Construction began ceremonially on September 1, 1906 at La Porte, Indiana, on the first of the feeder branches from downtown to a rural location dubbed South La Porte where the junction with the main line and the operating headquarters were to be. Miller cut the first sod there with a silver spade, and there was much junketing. However, serious work only began in the New Year. The 3.5 miles (5.6 km) branch took until June 15, 1907 to finish and open, and this slow progress was the first sign of problems.

For the opening, the CSB&C bought two standard wooden combine interurban electric passenger cars from the Niles Car and Manufacturing Company. As a publicity stunt, their paintwork included destination names reading New York at one end and Chicago at the other. Down each side was Chicago Air Line New York. The car barn built at South La Porte had a fascia reading Chicago New York Air Line, and Air Line was to be the name used for the passenger service of the CSB&C throughout its history.

Meanwhile, the promoters had begun the publication of a monthly periodical boosting the scheme, the Air Line News, in October 1906. This dramatized every development in the construction work, for example: "A huge Vulcan steam shovel is already on the job, taking big bites out of hills that stand in the path of the straight and level speedway that is to be the Air Line". The editor was Charles Burton, a veteran Indiana journalist and former printer of the state's official publications. The project was trumpeted nationally, stock sold with great rapidity and, by the end of the year, the company had 15,000 shareholders and funds of $2,000,000. (Note: equivalent to $71.7 million in 2025 adjusted for inflation)

=== Building the main line ===
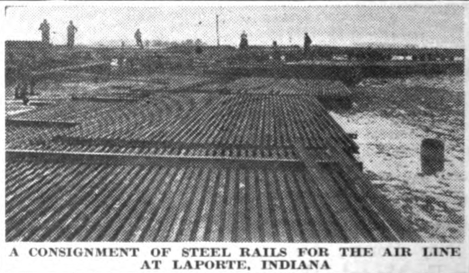
Rails for the La Porte branch during construction.

The section of the main line that was actually built, 17.5 miles (28.2 km), ran from South La Porte westwards to a location north of Woodville named Goodrum after George C. Goodrum, a major shareholder from Fall River, Massachusetts. There were three railroad crossings in this distance, over the Pere Marquette Railway, Monon Railroad and the Wabash Railroad. Each of these was provided with a heavy girder bridge, approached by immense fills to keep the gradients down. The fill material came from two deep cuts on the route. The track was built to steam-road standards, allegedly with 85 pound (38.5 kg) rail and white oak ties — in fact, 60-pound (27 kg) rails were used. Every sixth tie was extra long to accommodate the future third conducting rail, although a trolley wire was strung to power the cars as a temporary measure. Only a single track was laid, although there was space for a second. Investors were taken out to view these two portions of the line in operation, and the continuing work. However, further progress continued to be slow and the depression of 1907–1908 worsened the financial problems arising.

The main line was opened to Westville Road (Route 421), just east of the Monon Railroad bridge, in June 1908. To generate some revenue, an amusement park called "Air Line Park" was set up west of the Pere Marquette Railroad bridge. This proved very successful, and thousands visited on weekends when a ten-cent shuttle service from La Porte was provided. This was to be the only public service on the main line for the next three years, running from La Porte to Westville Road and back.

The eventual downfall of the Air Line scheme arose as a result of the capital expended on crossing Coffee Creek, a minor watercourse running west of the Wabash Railroad bridge. To keep to the advertised grade prescribed by the incredibly stringent engineering specifications, the GSB&C engineered a monstrous fill across the little creek's valley, 180 feet (55 m) wide and 2 miles (3.2 km) long and containing a steel trestle for stability. The extent of this work meant that the line only opened to Goodrum on November 1, 1911.

The immense expense occasioned by this engineering work, and some alleged (but never prosecuted or substantiated) accounting irregularities as well as other putatively fraudulent practices, led to the failure of the main line to extend beyond a dozen and a half miles through the Indiana countryside. The GSB&C only ever ran a total of 21-mile (34 km) on its own tracks, according to its official reports.

=== Gary and Interurban Railway ===
The GSB&C Air Line railway company quickly morphed into an electric railway system serving the new city of Gary, and this process was underway even before the Coffee Creek fill was finished in 1911.

Gary came into being when the United States Steel Corporation constructed a new steelworks on a virgin site on Lake Michigan in the spring of 1906, and when the city was platted, three main streets were created wide enough to include reserve track streetcar lines. Hence, the streetcar service could use equipment of interurban standard, and this was reflected in the name of the streetcar company founded on July 18, 1907, the Gary and Interurban Railway. There was no initial official connection with the GSB&C, but the Co-operative Construction Company building the latter's main line was also responsible for its construction.

The system opened on May 20, 1908, and by year's end had a spine route north to south on Broadway. This ran from the steelworks main gate at 4th Avenue to the city limits at the Little Calumet River bridge, and two crosstown routes ran west of this to the city limits—one on 5th Avenue and the other on 11th Avenue (10th Avenue from Broadway to the Pennsylvania Railroad bridge).

The first major extension of the system was to Hammond to the west, when the 11th Avenue line was extended via Clark Road, 9th Avenue, Summer (now 165th) Street and Sibley Street to a terminus loop on Calumet-State-Hohman. This opened on February 8, 1910.

Unfortunately, as part of its franchise the streetcar company agreed with the city to limit fares within city limits to three cents for any ride, or ten for a quarter (25 cents). No provision was made for inflation.

=== Valparaiso and Northern Railway ===
Meanwhile, on 25 August 1908 the GSB&C incorporated an independent but wholly owned subsidiary company, the Valparaiso and Northern Railway, to build two feeder branches connecting to the main line at Goodrum and serving Valparaiso to the south and Chesterton to the north. Again construction work dragged on, for the lines opened from Valparaiso to the popular recreational destination of Flint Lake on July 4, 1910, Chesterton to Goodrum on 18 February 1911, Flint Lake to Woodville on October 7, 1911 and from Woodville over a bridge crossing the Baltimore and Ohio Railroad line to Goodrum on February 17, 1912. The GSB&C was then given an east-to-north curve to connect to the new Valparaiso to Chesterton through line at Goodrum, while excavation continued to the west to the fourth railroad bridge which was to be over the B&O at a very skew angle.

=== Gary Connecting Railways ===
By 1911, it was obvious that the future of the GSB&C Air Line railway could only be secured by providing an immediate connection with the streetcar network of Gary. So, on June 1, 1911 a company entitled the Gary Connecting Railways was incorporated as the second wholly owned subsidiary of the GSB&C. It immediately began construction of a connecting line, beginning at Broadway & 11th Avenue, downtown at Gary, and running down Central Avenue to East Gary. This was opened on January 6, 1912. (East Gary used to be called Lake Station, but changed its name to East Gary in 1908. It changed its name back to Lake Station in 1977, owing to Gary having become a post-industrial slum.) The line was completed to Woodville on August 14, 1912, and made a triangular wye junction with the Valparaiso and Northern Railway at a spot called Woodville Junction, just south of the latter's bridge over the B&O railroad and on the other side of the latter from Goodrum.

An important aspect of this connecting line was, that the route ran along the authorised route of the original Air Line scheme from East Gary until it met the B&O railroad at a location called Babcock. It then hugged the south side of the railroad until it reached Woodville Junction. The direct skew bridge under construction over the railroad at Babcock was abandoned. This was the definitive indication that the dream of a Chicago to New York express line was finally dead.

Also important was that the line crossed the Michigan Central Railroad at Garyton (now part of Portage) on the level. A junction curve was put in place for freight exchange, and the GSB&C invested in dedicated equipment in to develop a freight service.

The completion of this line also allowed a Hammond to La Porte via Gary passenger service, beginning September 5, 1912. This became known as the Air Line service locally.

In the same year, the GSB&C decided to shut its power plant at South La Porte and purchase electricity from a public source as this was cheaper.

=== East Chicago Street Railway ===
The last initiative of the GSB&C was the promotion of a streetcar company called the East Chicago Street Railway to serve Indiana Harbor. This subsidiary was incorporated on July 23, 1912, and opened from the end of the 5th Avenue line at Gary's city limits via Cline Avenue, 145th Street, Cedar Street and Guthrie Street to a terminus on Watling Street. This opened on February 15, 1913.

=== Gary and Interurban Railroad ===
Shareholders of the Air Line Company rebelled in 1911, and began a movement to purchase the Gary and Interurban Railway streetcar system in order to safeguard even a small part of their investment. This was successful, but the stock of the latter company was purchased with funds raised by the sale of 4% fixed interest bonds. When a controlling interest had been acquired, the Cary and Interurban Railroad Company was incorporated on January 28, 1913. This consolidated the GSB&C, the Gary and Interurban Railway, the East Chicago Street Railway, the Gary Connecting Railways and the Valparaiso and Northern Railway. The Chicago–New York Electric Air Line Railroad Company was wound up, and the Air Line News abruptly ceased publication. This was the official abandonment of the great express electric railway scheme.

The morph from an express electric railway project into a city streetcar and interurban system was complete, but was only to last intact for just under five years. A loop line was added from Indiana Harbor to Hammond, from 145th & Main, Parish Avenue, Chicago Avenue and Kennedy Avenue -this became important for the freight service of the GSB&C. Also added was a spur along Bridge Street in Gary to the gates of the American Bridge Company plant.

=== Gary and Southern Traction ===
The city of Gary had two other interurban lines, not part of the Air Line system but having trackage on it to access the downtown interurban station at 11th & Broadway and also to run on to the gates of the steelworks at the north end of Broadway.

The first to open, in 1912, was the Gary and Southern Traction which continued the Broadway streetcar line to Lottaville (now part of Merrillville) and Crown Point.

=== Gary and Hobart Traction ===
The other was the Gary and Hobart Traction, which had an abortive opening with a gasoline car later in 1912 but was shut after a month. Electrification and permanent opening was in 1914. The route was along 37th Avenue from the Broadway line, through Froebel and New Chicago to terminate at 3rd and Main in Hobart.

=== End of original railway ===
The refusal of the city to allow fare rises for journeys in Gary led to a shortfall in income which caused the Gary and Interurban Railway company to default on a bond issue repayment at the start of 1915. As a result, a receiver was appointed on October 17, 1915.

On January 1, 1916, one of the original cars and the GSB&C's work motor met in a head-on collision in fog at Brooks just west of Air Line Park. The passenger car was telescoped and had to be scrapped, three people were killed and twelve injured.

On September 18, 1917 the receiver oversaw the breakup of the G&I into its constituent parts, and their separate sale. The original Air Line company shareholders were finally wiped out.

The GSB&C was capitalised at $7,000,000. (Note: equivalent to $251 million in 2025 adjusted for inflation) Its assets, comprising the line, rolling stock and equipment, were sold for $75,000. (Note: equivalent to $1.88 million in 2025 adjusted for inflation) This was an upset price, meaning that it was the minimum acceptable according to a true valuation. Since the company was a statutory public service, for the next 24 days a shuttle was run from La Porte to Goodrum. After the required legal formalities, service on the Air Line railway ceased on November 3, 1917, and the tracks and bridges east of Goodrum were recovered for scrap.

=== Survival of system ===
The truncated Air Line system did, however, survive.

The streetcar system became the Gary Street Railway in 1917, and continued to expand. in 1918 the line to the Sheet Mill and Tin Mill of the American Sheet & Tin Plate Company was opened from 5th Avenue & Buchanan Street. In 1924, a line was opened to the National Tube Company plant via 5th Avenue, Virginia Street and 2nd Avenue. Later in the same year, the 5th Avenue portion of this was extended as another new line, to Lake Street in Miller. On the other hand, the Indiana Harbor to Hammond line was abandoned as unprofitable and this was the first contraction.

The lines from Gary to Valparaiso and Chesterton went to the Gary and Valparaiso Railway, which hence inherited what was left of the Air Line system. The Chesterton line was replaced by a bus in 1922.

=== Gary Railways ===
In 1925, there was a major consolidation of Gary's railways under the Gary Railways company which was owned by the Midland Utilities Corporation of Samuel Insull. All the surviving railways were annexed, except the Crown Point line which was bought out in 1928.

Conversion of routes to buses began in 1933, with the Crown Point line beyond 45th Avenue. In 1935, the Miller line went and in 1938 the conversion of the whole system was begun. In that year the line between Tin Mill and Sheet Mill was closed, and the Valparaiso service cut back to Garyton on October 22. This reduced the Air Line system to a stub. In 1939, the Hobart and Indiana Harbor lines went and the Fifth Avenue line cut back to the Pennsylvania Railroad station. Bridge Street and Tin Works were closed in 1940 and the stub on Fifth Avenue in 1941.

=== Final end ===
What was left at the start of 1942 were the Broadway, Hammond, Tube Works and Garyton lines. The last named terminated at a loop installed when the Valparaiso line closed in 1938, and the half mile of track before this was the very last section of the authorised route of the Air Line scheme to have a rail service.

The final end of the Air Line saga came on October 22, 1942, when the last Garyton car returned to Gary in the evening.

The outbreak of war saved the remaining lines for a time. The Hammond and Broadway lines were converted to buses in 1946, leaving a little shuttle service from 5th & Broadway to Tube Works. The last streetcar in Gary ran on February 28, 1948.

== Route ==
The Air Line system before 1917 consisted of a main line from 11th and Broadway in Gary to La Porte, with two branches to Chesterton and Valparaiso.

The Continuation line ran south-east along Central Avenue through Kimmel and Pine Street to East Gary, which it entered on Fairview Avenue. From Garyton, it took the authorised course of the original Air Line scheme through Garyton, Crisman, McCool and Babcock before following the B&O railroad through Eastman to Woodville Junction where the Valparaiso branch met in a triangular wye. The line turned north as the Valparaiso Northern, and continued as the branch to Chesterton. This was a short distance, with no intermediate stops.

The Valparaiso line had three intermediate stops at Wahob, Burlington Beach (for Flint Lake) and Vale Park. It terminated at Lincoln & Franklin without a loop but with a reversing wye on Lincoln.

The Air Line service went round the north side of the triangular wye at Woodville junction, across the B&O bridge to Goodrum. Here, it had to reverse onto the original Air Line railway because the junction curve was north to east, with a station building in the angle. The main line then ran arrow-straight due east to South La Porte. After the notorious Coffee Creek fill (now obliterated by the Toll Road), stops were: Smiley, County Line, Westville Road, Brooks, Air Line Park and Door Village. Apart from the last, these each had a short spur with the junction facing east.

South La Porte is no longer a named locality, the rural location being at the south end of the main runway of La Porte Airport. However it was the operational headquarters, and had a combined car barn and power house. Here also was a north to east spur from the Pere Marquette Railroad (now also abandoned), allowing freight exchange and coal delivery to the power house. The track from this spur ran down the side of the power house and car barn to the La Porte Branch where the junction faced the city, and cars exited the barn down this track and reversed if they were going in the Goodrum direction. A short connecting line ran from next to the barn to the main line, west to east.

The La Porte branch turned north before State Route 39, from the east of the car barn to run into La Porte along I Street via what is now S 150 W. After stops at Andrews and Fair Grounds, it arrived at a terminal loop running round Lincoln, Monroe, Jefferson and Madison.

On Lincoln Way was also the terminal loop track of the two lines of another interurban, the Chicago, South Bend and Northern Indiana Railway to Michigan City and to Goshen via South Bend. The two companies were friendly, and exchanged freight here. Also, passengers for the Air Line used the CSB&NI facilities since the GSB&C did not maintain any in the city.

== Equipment ==
=== Passengers ===
The GSB&C's little roster of rolling stock was subsumed into that of the Gary and Interurban Railroad in 1913. However, the company kept legal possession and so the stable was sold on with the line in 1917.

The original two 1907 power cars obtained from the Niles Car and Manufacturing Company in 1907 were numbered 101 and 102. This pair's original paintwork proclaimed the "Chicago Air Line New York". They were renumbered G&I 400 and 401 in 1913. To handle the traffic to the Air Line Park amusement ground, in 1909 three unpowered trailer cars were ordered from the McGuire-Cummings Manufacturing Company and these were originally numbered 103, 104 and 105.

However, two more power cars were purchased from the McGuire-Cummings Company in 1912, which were given the numbers 103 and 104 and also names: Ohm and Ampere. The trailers became 105, 106 and 107. In 1913, these became G&I 402, 403, 500, 2300 and 2301.

400 was wrecked in the fatal accident at Brooks on January 1, 1916, when it met the work motor 3000 (see below). Its sister, 401, was sold to The Milwaukee Electric Railway and Light Company. 402 and 403 were sold to the Des Moines and Central Iowa Railway. 500 was apparently scrapped, but 2300 and 2301 went to the Gary and Valparaiso Railway.

=== Freight ===
There were six box cars for freight, numbered 2000 to 2005. Three of them were from McGuire-Cummings, but 2000 to 2002 were second-hand from an unknown manufacturer and were apparently disposed of or scrapped in 1913. The M-C cars kept their numbers. 2001 was cut down into a flat car numbered 2002 in 1922, and the other two were scrapped in 1926

Number 3000 was a double-truck M-C work motor which could haul box cars, and this also kept its number in 1913. Its fate in 1917 is unknown.

Finally, 1001 was an express freight motor cars, new from M-C and built for the job — not a converted passenger car. This also was sold to the Des Moines and Central Iowa Railway, and survived into the 1950s.

All this freight equipment was also bought in 1912.

== Operations ==
=== Passenger ===
After the opening of the connecting line to Gary from Woodville in 1912, the Air Line service comprised a through run from Hammond to La Porte via Gary, and used the four cars 101 to 104. This was semi-fast, dovetailed to run in between local services, and had a 15-minute layover at the main interurban station at Gary which was at 11th and Broadway. The total time taken to get to La Porte from Hammond was two and a half hours. The New York Central Railroad ran from Indiana Harbor, just north of Hammond, to La Porte in one and three quarter hours.

At first, there were eight weekday return trips and nine at weekends. In 1916 this was down to six each way daily.

At Woodville Junction, the service connected with shuttles running to Chesterton and Valparaiso. The former was a short ride, but the latter had three intermediate stops at Wahob, Burlington Beach (for Flint Lake) and Vale Park. Very limited services were offered from Gary direct to the two towns.

=== Freight ===
The GSB&C actively solicited freight traffic after 1912, when it bought an electric motor, box cars and an express car. By 1916, it had forty regular shippers. Before 1912, very limited less-than-carload (LCL) freight could be accommodated in the baggage compartments of the passenger cars. Dedicated local service was offered after that year from Indiana Harbor via Hammond, through Gary and Garyton to Woodville and then through La Porte to South Bend and Goshen via the Chicago, South Bend and Northern Indiana Railway. Thus, the Goshen, South Bend and Chicago Railway could finally claim to serve the first city in its title — even though not with a passenger service.

Freight forwarding to more distant locations was also done via the connections to the Pere Marquette Railroad at South La Porte and the Michigan Central Railroad at Garyton. The freight depot was opposite the passenger station at 11th & Broadway in Gary.

The most important commodity was milk, because roads in rural Indiana were still unsealed and the interurban gave local farmers marketing opportunities in Gary which they would not otherwise have. In 1913 70 cans went to Gary daily, but in 1916 there were 270.

After the GSB&C was abandoned in 1917, freight traffic on the Gary streetcar network mostly ceased.

== Remains ==
Earthworks on the Air Line's right-of-way and some of the colossal concrete bridge abutments are still visible to this day, and much of the route is visible as property boundaries. The abutments are on the abandoned Pere Marquette and Monon railroad lines.

Indiana Historical Bureau erected a historical marker in 1995 commemorating the scheme at CR250S & IN-39. The scanty ruins of the South La Porte power house cum car barn are extant near here, to the west of IN-39.

If you go down south on S 150 W, continuing I Street from La Porte, you can find a track to the north of a farmstead, which is on the alignment of the main line to New York. It stopped right here, and got no further.

At the other end, at Goodrum, ruins of a power house are in woods on the east side of IN-49 south of the Indiana Toll Road and near the junction with the N Calumet Avenue (the old IN-49). The Coffee Creek fill has mostly been obliterated by the building of the Toll Road.

== Legacy ==
The Air Line project has been called the greatest fiasco of the interurban era. However, the completed portion did become the progenitor of a successful street railway system after the initial financial woes.

Also, several other interurbans to as high a standard as the Air Line – though at a much smaller scale – were built. In 1907, the Philadelphia and Western Railroad opened its Upper Darby–Strafford line near Philadelphia with maximum grades of 2%, no grade crossings, and an absolute block signalling system. And after World War I, the railway tycoon Samuel Insull upgraded the interurbans around Chicago, and station-to-station averages as high as 70 miles per hour (110 km/h) were frequently attained. Parts of these lines are in use even today.

In 1943, Commander Edwin J. Quinby wrote a lengthy history of the CNYEAL for the publication Electric Railroads and closed the report with the following:

And as time goes on, electric railroad enthusiasts will visit the right-of-way over which the original construction work was done—and some of the more imaginative individuals will hear the deep-throated whistle of a big palatial interurban as its spirit still streaks along this romantic pike, and they will catch a glimpse of the golden inscription CHICAGO on one end of the car as it flashes by, and NEW YORK on the other end—hurrying, hurrying—for 36 years have passed since it started on its swift way and it hasn't reached either place.
