= Coffee Creek (Missouri) =

Stream in Missouri, United States

Coordinates: 38°20′00″N 92°47′54″W

Coffee Creek is a stream in Morgan County in the U.S. state of Missouri. It is a tributary of Little Gravois Creek and the Gravois arm of the Lake of the Ozarks.

Coffee Creek was named due to its dark waters resembling the color of coffee.

== See also ==
- List of rivers of Missouri
