= Coffee Creek (East Arm Little Calumet River tributary) =

Stream in Indiana, United States

Coordinates: 41°37′14″N 87°03′13″W

Coffee Creek is a stream in Porter County, Indiana, in the United States. It is a tributary of East Arm Little Calumet River.

According to tradition, a bag of coffee was lost in the stream, accounting for the name.

== Coffee Creek Watershed Preserve ==
The Coffee Creek Watershed Preserve is a watershed founded by The Coffee Creek Watershed Conservancy, a nonprofit organization formed in 1998. The nonprofit owns and manages the natural areas and respective facilities on the watershed preserve. According to its official site, the conservancy's mission is to protect and maintain the biodiversity of Coffee Creek, as well as host educational experiences for local schools.

=== Land and biodiversity ===
The preserve itself spans 157 acres, and consists of wetlands, woodlands, and prairie. The preserve is home to a myriad of fauna commonly found in Eastern United States prairies and tall grass ecosystems. The land managed by the Coffee Creek Watershed Conservancy also contains over 1,500 mature ash trees.

==== Emerald Ash Borer ====
The emerald ash borer, or EAB, is an invasive species to the watershed preserve. The insect is highly destructive to ash trees, a genus which includes four species native to Indiana. EAB infestation was first discovered in 2010, and by 2012 all ash trees were found to have markings from the insect.

== See also ==
- List of rivers of Indiana
- Emerald ash borer
- Fauna of the United States
- Chicago – New York Electric Air Line Railroad
