= Coffee Creek (Montana) =

Stream in Montana, United States

Coordinates: 47°32′38″N 109°50′54″W

Coffee Creek is a stream in the U.S. state of Montana named for its dark waters.

== See also ==
- List of rivers of Montana
