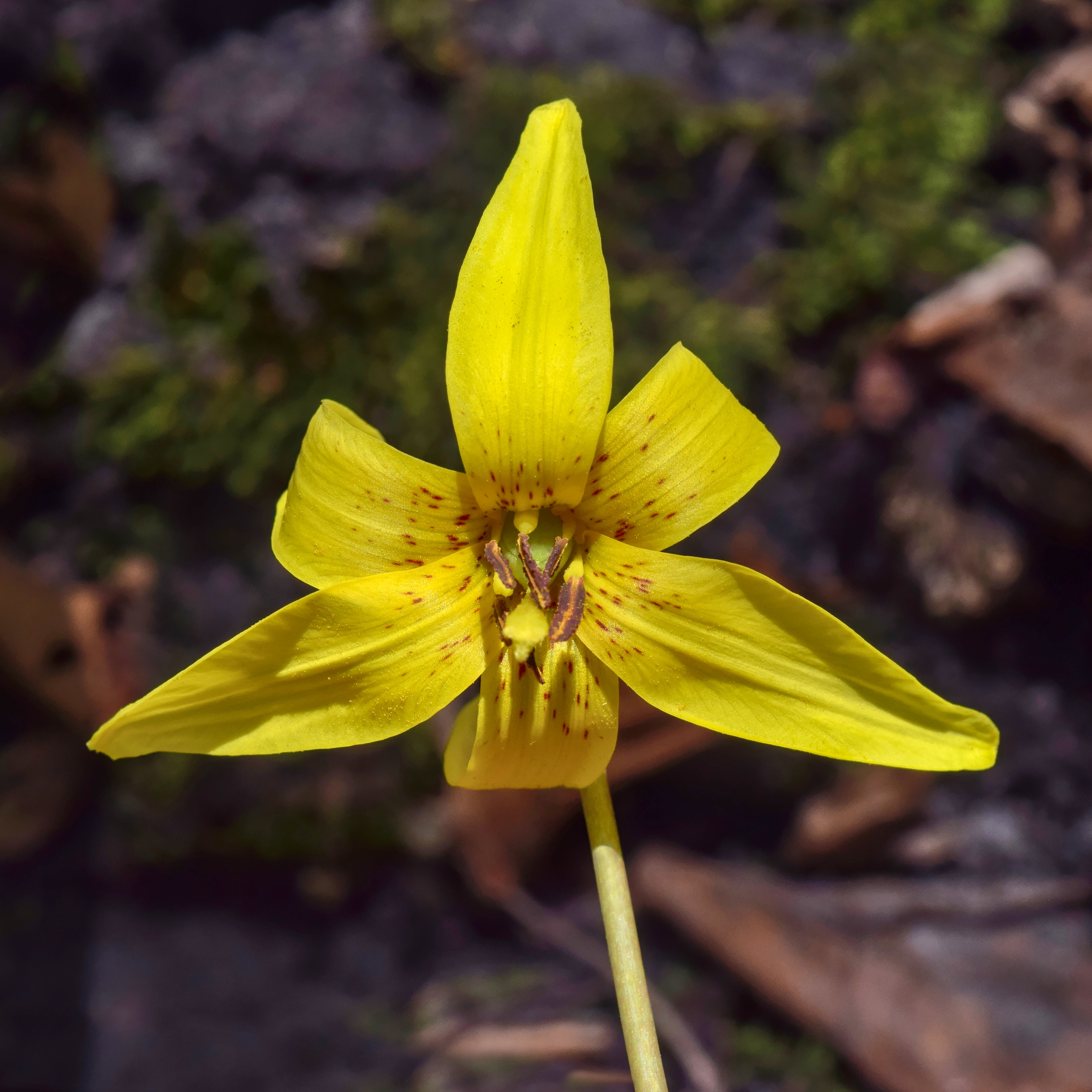

Conservation status
- Secure (NatureServe)

Scientific classification
- Kingdom: Plantae
- Clade: Tracheophytes
- Clade: Angiosperms
- Clade: Monocots
- Order: Liliales
- Family: Liliaceae
- Subfamily: Lilioideae
- Tribe: Lilieae
- Genus: Erythronium
- Species: E. americanum

Binomial name
- Erythronium americanum Ker-Gawl.
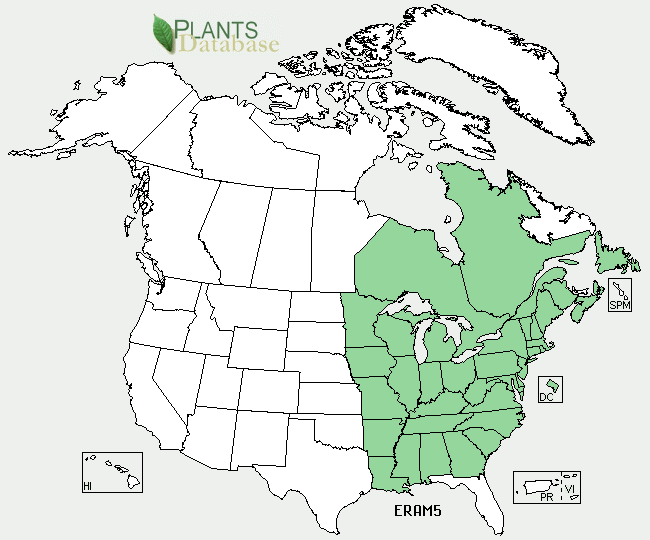
- Range within North America

Synonyms
- Erythronium flavum Sm.

= Erythronium americanum =

Species of flowering plant

Erythronium americanum, the trout lily, yellow trout lily, fawn lily, yellow adder's-tongue, or yellow dogtooth violet, is a species of perennial, colony forming, spring ephemeral flower native to North America and dwelling in woodland habitats. Within its range it is a very common and widespread species, especially in eastern North America. The common name "trout lily" refers to the appearance of its gray-green leaves mottled with brown or gray, which allegedly resemble the coloring of brook trout.

The range is from Labrador south to Georgia, west to Mississippi, and north to Minnesota.

== Description ==
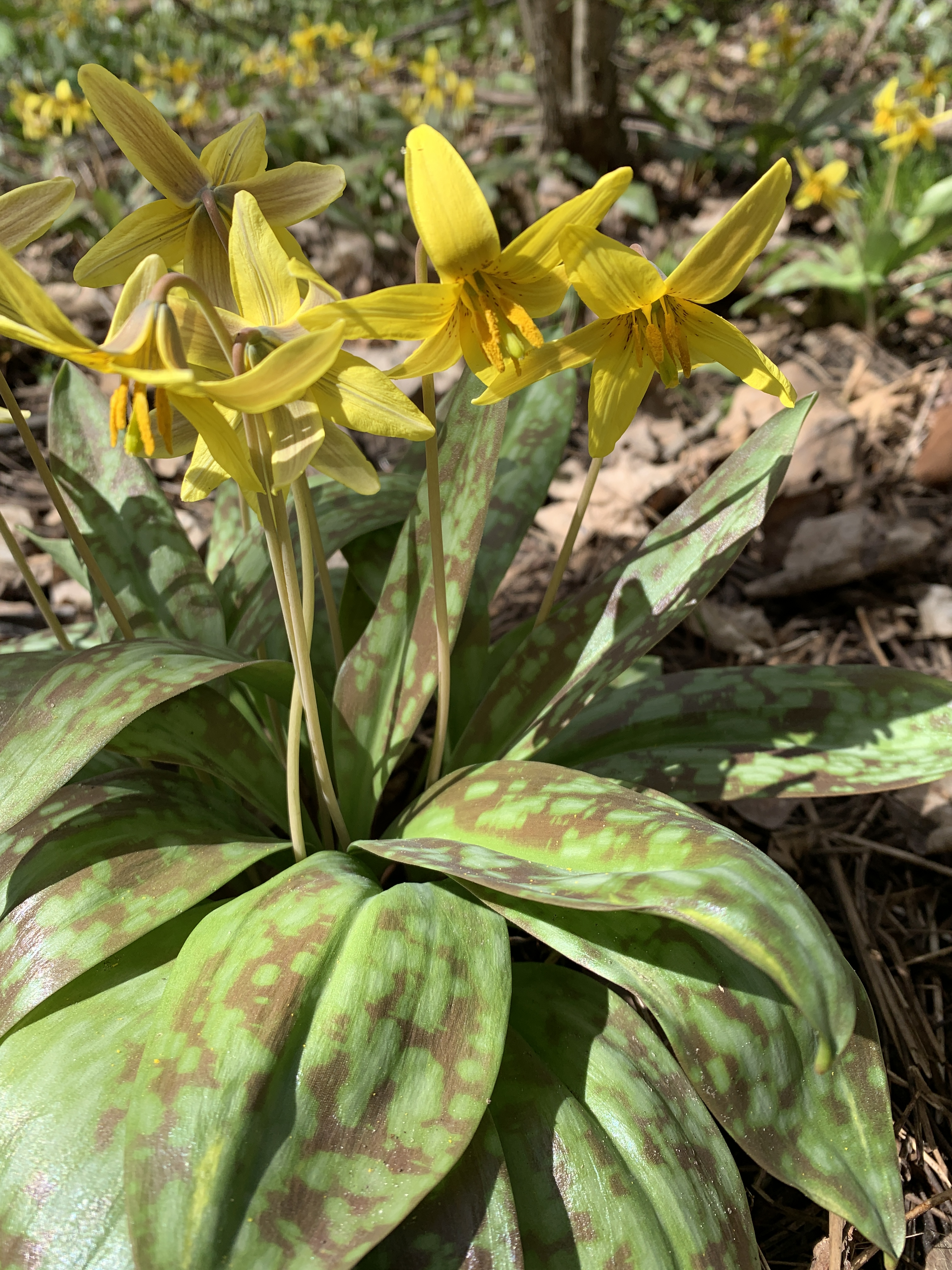
Erythronium americanum Ker-Gawler, Sainte-Anne-de-la-Pérade, Quebec, Canada

=== Flowers ===
A yellow trout lily produces an erect flower stalk with a nodding, bisexual flower with six recurved, yellow, lanceolate tepals. The 20 to 33 mm long tepals are composed of three petals and three petal-like sepals. E. americanum does not flower for the first 4 to 7 years of its life. In any given colony, only 0.5% will have flowers.

Trout lilies bloom in early spring before the trees growing above them develop leaves. Blooming at this time allows them unobstructed access to sunlight and time to grow when soil nutrient levels are high. The flowers close at night.

=== Leaves ===
Non-flowering plants grow a single leaf whereas flowering plants grow two basal leaves. The 8 to 23 centimeters long yellow trout lily leaves grow in the spring and range from elliptic to lanceolate leaves, the leaves may be mottled with gray to purple and have entire leaf margins.

The leaves should not be consumed by women who are trying to conceive; some Native American groups, including the Cherokee, traditionally used Erythronium americanum (trout lily) as a contraceptive or abortifacient. However, no modern pharmacological studies have confirmed the contraceptive or abortifacient effects.

=== Fruit and sexual reproduction ===
Erythronium americanum does not reproduce very effectively via sexual reproduction with only 10% of pollinated flowers developing seeds. The fruit is a 12 to 15 mm long capsule that is held off the ground by the flower stalk. E. americanum is a myrmecochorous plant, meaning that ants help disperse the seeds and reduce seed predation. To make the seeds more appealing to ants they have an elaiosome which is a structure that attracts ants.

=== Corm and asexual reproduction ===
A trout lily grows from a 15 to 28 mm oval underground corm. The corm is often located in the upper 11 cm of soil although it may be as deep as 30 cm. The corms of E. americanum are buried very deeply compared to other lily family plants. The corms are mostly composed of storage tissue containing large amounts of energy rich starch. The corm is covered by a papery husk which is the remains of the previous year's stalk.

Trout lilies grow in colonies, some of which have been dated to be up to 300 years old. The individuals within a colony will often reproduce asexually via a "dropper" or from small bulbs budding off of the main corm. A dropper is a tubular fleshy stem that grows out from a parent corm, up toward the surface and then penetrates deep into the soil where another corm is formed from the tip of the dropper. The stem connecting the daughter and parent corm then dies.

== Subspecies ==
There are two subspecies, Erythronium americanum subsp. americanum and Erythronium americanum subsp. harperi. The americanum subspecies is a distributed more northerly and the harperi subspecies only occurs in the south, from Louisiana to Tennessee and Georgia. The subspecies differ in the shape of the capsule and stigma, with E. americanum subsp. americanum having a capsule with a rounded, truncate, or short-apiculate tip and erect stigma lobes without groves. E. americanum subsp. harperi has a distinctly apiculate capsule apex and stigma lobes which are both grooved and recurved.

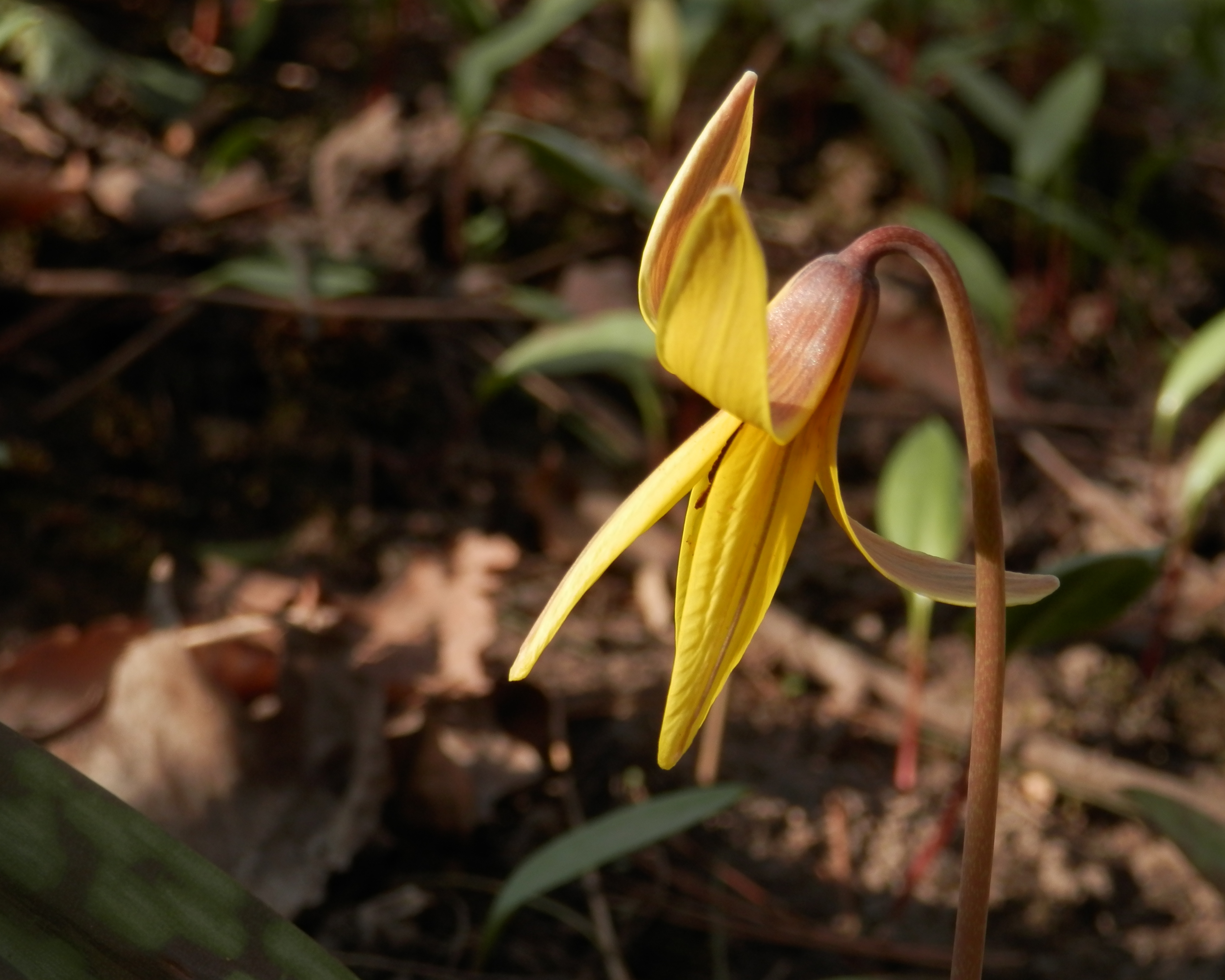

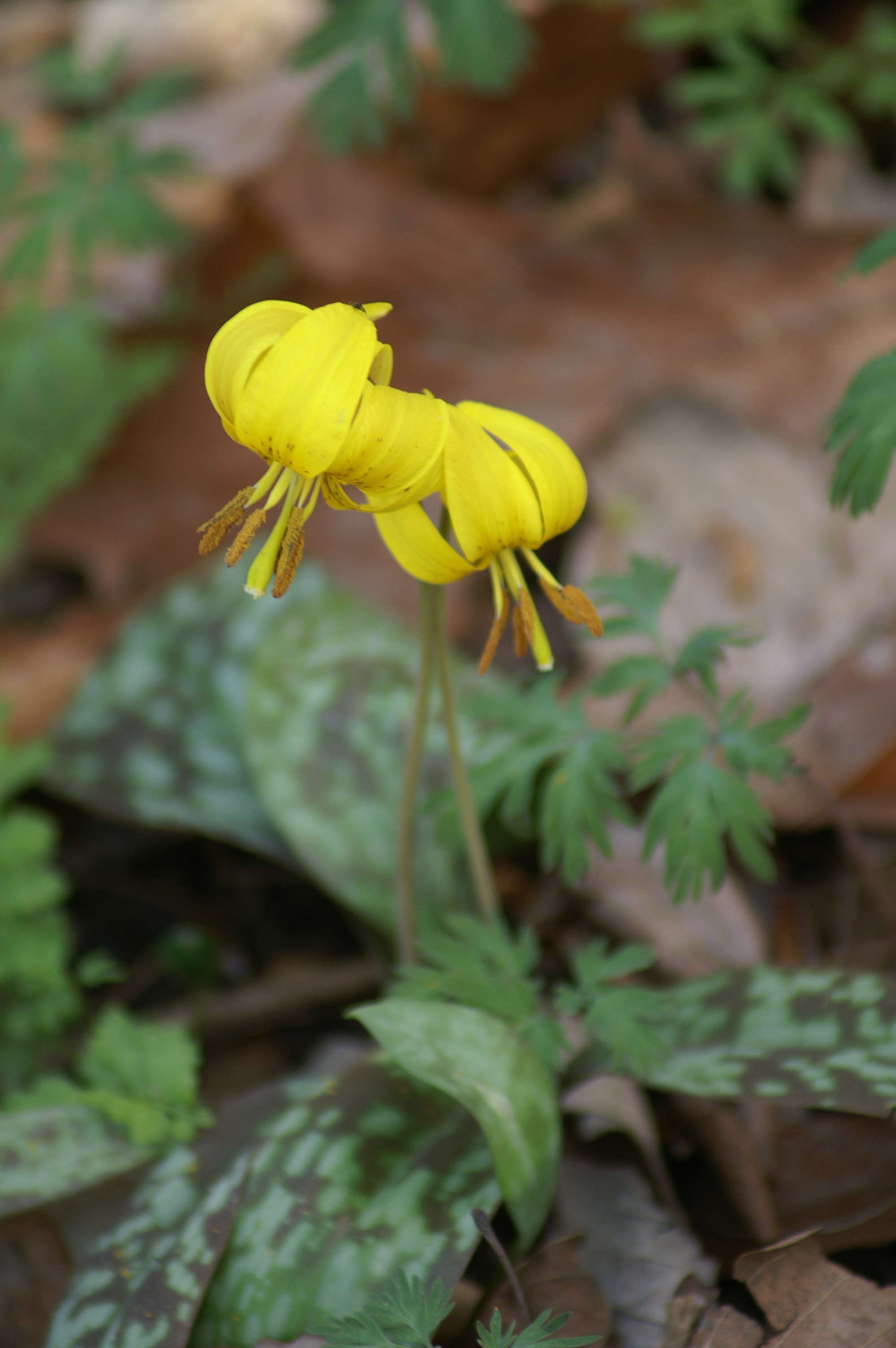

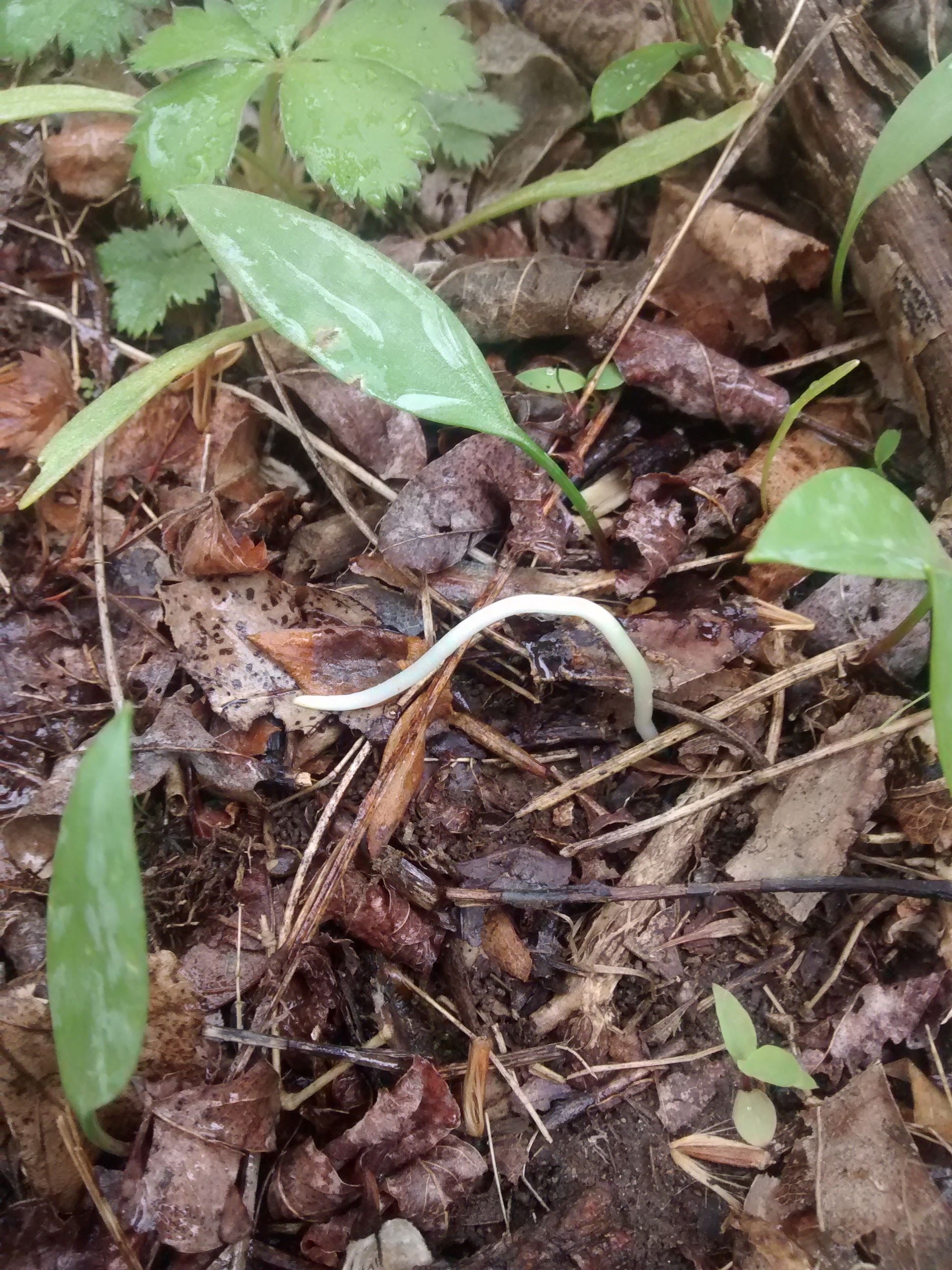
A dropper coming from a bulb

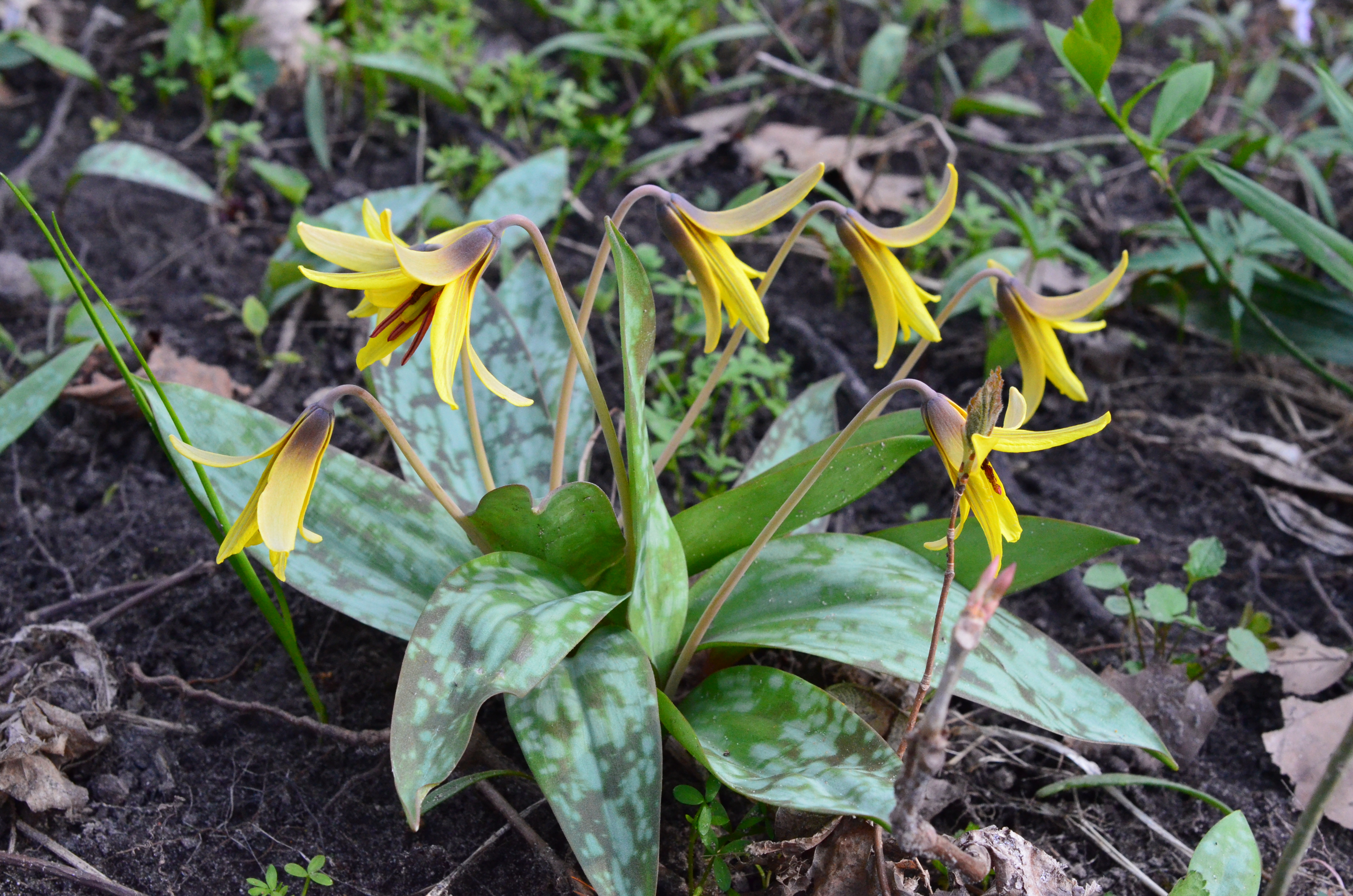

== See also ==
- List of plants known as lily
