= Joseph Bailly Homestead =

- Joseph Bailley Homestead
- U.S. National Register of Historic Places
- U.S. National Historic Landmark District
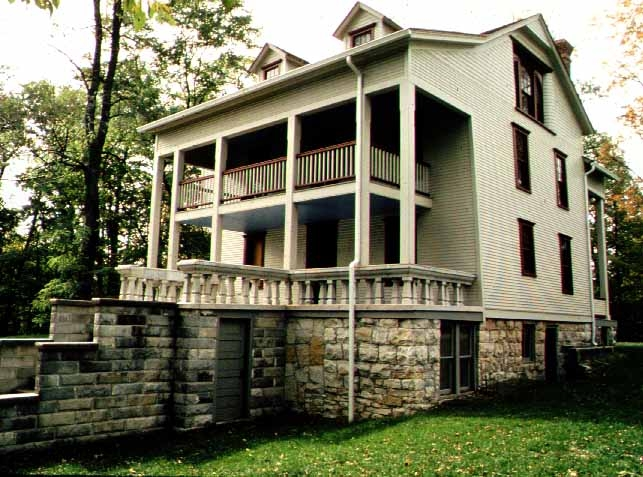
- Bailly Homestead: restored back porch, in about 1980

- Location within Indiana Location within the United States
- Nearest city: Porter, Indiana
- Coordinates: 41°37′23″N 87°5′39″W
- Built: 1822 (Bailly's arrival); 1834 (construction of homestead)
- NRHP reference No.: 66000005

Significant dates
- Added to NRHP: October 15, 1966
- Designated NHLD: December 29, 1962

The Joseph Bailly Homestead, also known as Joseph Bailly Homestead and Cemetery, in Porter, Indiana, is a U.S. National Historic Landmark.

The Bailly Homestead is preserved by the National Park Service in Indiana Dunes National Park in Porter, Indiana. The Homestead was the home of Joseph Aubert de Gaspé Bailly de Messein (1774–1835), one of the first permanent white settlers in Northwest Indiana. This homestead, begun in 1834, is one of the only surviving elements of the once-significant fur trade in the region. It received its landmark designation in 1962.

Bailly brought his family to the southern shore of Lake Michigan in 1822, first living in a log house built soon afterward. The Homestead remained in the family until the death of his granddaughter, Rose Howe, in 1917. The Homestead is sometimes referred to as the "Bailly-Howe" Home. The National Park Service acquired the Homestead on November 26, 1971.

== Ownership ==
Joseph Bailly acquired the Homestead and surrounding lands during the 1830s when the Calumet was opened to white settlement. When he died in 1835, the Homestead went to his wife. At her death in 1866, it went to their daughter Rose Bailly Howe. Rose Howe's daughter Frances inherited the property in 1891 when Rose died. Frances offered the property to the Literary Society of St. Catherine of Sienna in 1914. The Society did not accept the gift.

At Frances Howe's death (1917) the property was temporarily held by Louis G. Horne from September 1, to September 23, 1919. In September 1919, it was deeded to the School Sisters of Notre Dame of the Lake, Milwaukee, Wisconsin

== Homestead ==
Originally the Homestead included the house, and eight other structures to the west of the drive. There would also have been stables for the coach horses and phaeton.

== Bailly House ==
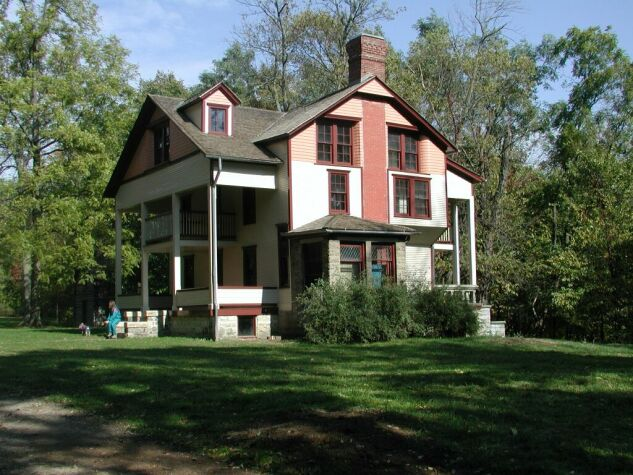
Joseph Bailly's home.

Construction began shortly before 1835, the year of Joseph Bailly's death. The house is 2½-stories built out of "hewn logs of cedar and oak, closely fitted, and pinned at the corners." The house was then sided with lapped weather boards. After Joseph's death, his daughter Ester Bailly Whistler's family lived in the house and appeared to have made no changes. When they moved to Denver, Ester's sister Rose Bailly Howe's family assumed occupancy. Rose's husband, Francis Howe, arranged to sell timber from the Homestead for the construction of a nearby railroad (for which he was an employee). Francis remodeled and installed a kitchen in the basement. After Francis Howe's death, the husband of Hortense Bailly Wicker (Joel) took over management. He apparently did not modify the house.

Before her death, the widow Marie Bailly and her daughters, Rose Howe and Teresa, along with Rose's two girls, returned. The house was in need of repairs. Minor repairs were completed before Marie's death. After Marie Bailly's death, the homestead was vacant from 1869 until about 1891. At that time, extensive work was done to replace floors and walls.

=== Dining room ===
The Baillys held Mass in their home for years when circuit-riding priests (Roman Catholics) were traveling through. The family and other Catholics in the area attended Mass. "Tradition holds that mass was celebrated from a makeshift altar - a table, placed in front of the dining room fireplace."

The dining room had heaved eal flooring and whitewood ceilings and wood paneling. Peter G. Larson paneled the dining room and installed new flooring throughout the house for Mrs. Howe. His work was repaired by Mr. La Roche in the 1930s-1950s. The dining room occupies the western half of the first floor of the house, sharing the floor with the living room in its eastern half and a center hall. The dining room is as it was around 1910. An ornate mantelpiece was carved by Miss Cora Green, the daughter of a Chesterton physician.

=== Living room ===
The east side of the house is occupied by the living room. The room is plaster walls with exposed ceiling beams (which may not be structurally needed). There is a fireplace at the center of the east wall.

The earliest descriptions are from about 1910. It is described 'as a pleasant, light and lived-in room'. At that time, the ceiling may have been paneled and the fireplace faced with blue and white Delft tiles. Above the mantel, the fireplace was unfinished. Margaret Larsen recalled that Rose Howe had a sofa on the inside wall facing the fireplace. There was tapestry hanging behind the sofa.

=== Conservatory ===
Miss Howe had a conservatory off the living room. It was added on in 1910. It is a small rectangular room set below the main floor. It was designed to receive plenty of light.

=== Hall and porches ===
A central hallway runs from the front porch to the back porch. The porches extend the entire width of the house on both the first and second floors.

== Log house ==
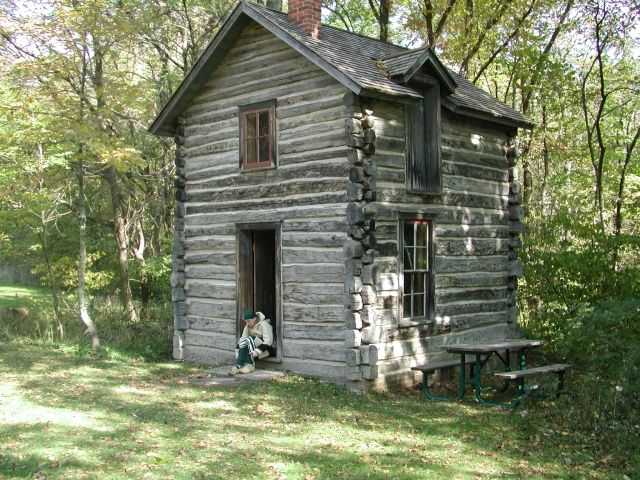
Two-Story Log House built as a "landscape companion" to the Chapel

The two-storey log building was built as a "landscape companion" to the Chapel just south of it. The building was built with logs salvaged from two older buildings. It is believed to have been built by Rose Howe after her return from Europe in 1874. A night-watchman lived on the ground floor.

== Storehouse ==
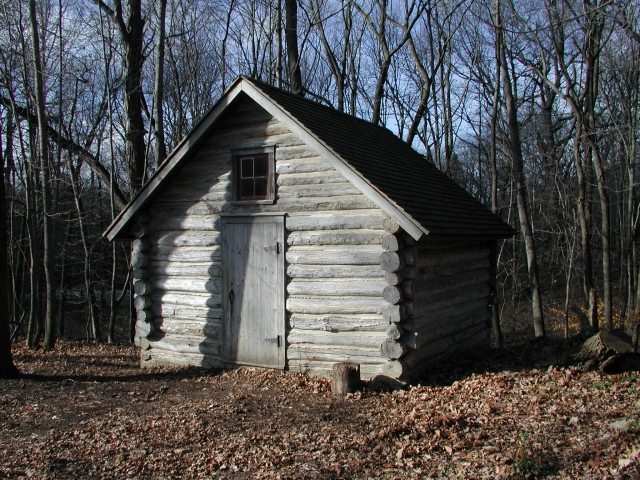
The storehouse.

Originally, larger, the existing storehouse was formed from the 'good' logs of an older trading structure used by Joseph Bailly.

== Summer kitchen and chapel ==
Originally a two-story kitchen, this is where Joseph Bailly and his stepdaughter Theresa de la Vigne died. When the widow Marie Bailly returned in 1855, she chose this building as her home. The outside chimney had fallen and the space closed. She lived here until her death in 1866. From 1866 to 1869 Rose Bailly Howe and her daughters Rose and Frances held Sunday devotions in this building. Mrs. Howe commissioned a local carpenter to rebuild it into a chapel.

A new brick foundation was laid with wooden sills. Flooring from the kitchen's second floor was reused for the chapel floor. The interior was plastered and the building completed by 1874. It remained unchanged until 1900 when materials from the main house were used for repairs. Materials from the parlor were used as that is where the family had held devotions before. This is when the apse was added. Whitewood from the parlor ceiling was used on the chapel ceiling. The building may have been moved northward about twenty-five feet.

While the Sisters of Notre Dame used the homestead, they did not use this chapel, but used a front bedroom on the second floor as a chapel. It then remained unused until 1946, when the new owner, Mr. and Mrs. Joseph LaRoche, rented it out as a residence. No additional alterations were made.

== Brick house ==
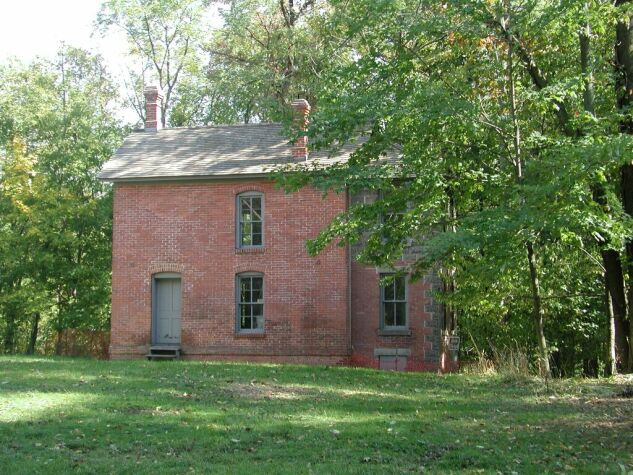
Bailly Brickhouse on the southwest edge of the Homestead.

To the southwest of the main house is the brick house. It was built in 1874 by Miss Rose Howe after her return from Europe. Miss Howe died in 1879, dating the construction 3–4 years earlier. The second floor was a studio and the ground floor was used as the kitchen.

== Bailly Cemetery ==
The cemetery is three-quarters of a mile north on the edge of a sand ridge. The first recorded burial was Robert, the son of Joseph Bailly, in about 1827. Subsequently, the site has been considered a family graveyard. Burials of those outside the Bailly family are numerous. Today, they are all unmarked, including Swedish residents of the area. Outside the cemetery platform to the north there are eight recorded tombstones, two of which are older than 1827: Peter Carlbon, 1814; and Thomas B. Speer, 1817.

== See also ==
- List of National Historic Landmarks in Indiana
- National Register of Historic Places listings in Porter County, Indiana
