= George Brown Mansion =

Historic house in Indiana, United States

- Brown, George, Mansion
- U.S. National Register of Historic Places
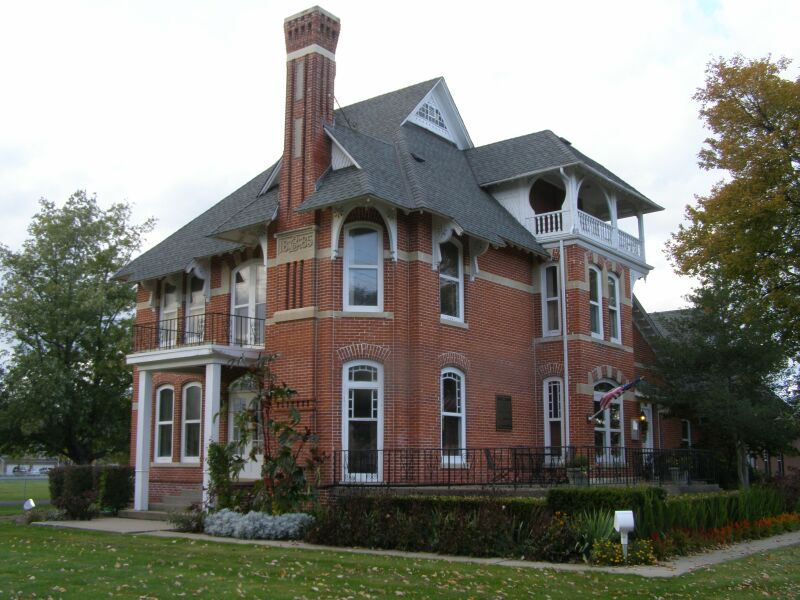

- Location within Indiana Location within the United States
- Location: 700 W. Porter Ave., Chesterton, Indiana
- Coordinates: 41°36′21″N 87°3′42″W
- Area: less than one acre
- Built: 1885
- Architect: Cicero Hine
- Architectural style: Queen Anne
- NRHP reference No.: 98001101
- Added to NRHP: August 28, 1998

The George Brown Mansion is an example of the Queen Anne's Style of architecture. It was a dominant style during the 1880s and 1890s, the time when Chesterton was a growing city in northern Indiana. George Brown arrived in the United States in 1852. In 1855, he married Charity Carter, daughter of a local family. He became a successful farmer in the township. The farm was located on what is 950 North, west of 400 East. By the year 1882 he was operating a farm of 900 acres (360 ha). He had expanded into supplying cordwood to the Porter brickyards after 1870. George and Charity had ten children. In 1884 George Brown bought 120 acres (0.49 km^{2}) in the town of Chesterton from the John Thomas family. His plans called for a retirement home on this site. He engaged Chicago architect Cicero Hine to design the house. In 1891 the family sold all but 10 acres (40,000 m^{2}). It was the same year, that he built a brick store downtown at Calumet and Broadway. During the 1902 fire, it was the only store to survive. Charity Brown died in 1895 at 56. George died in 1899 at the age of 71. After a probate fight, his son John Franklin (Frank) moved into the house with his family.

In 2010, the Westchester Historical Society uses the Brown Mansion as the Westchester Township History Museum and Society offices.

== Architecture ==
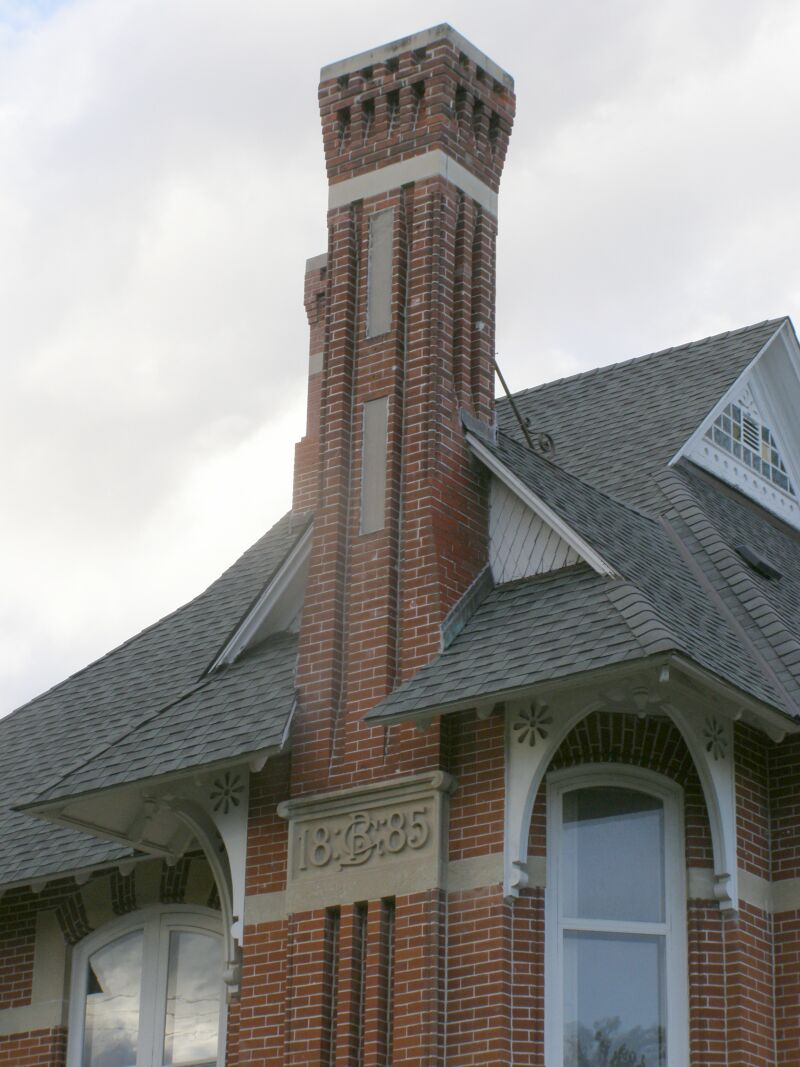
Chimney with decorative stone - date and initials

The Queen Anne's Stylehouse was built in 1885 by George and Charity Brown. The contrasting colors of brick are characteristics of this style. The smooth white limestone horizontal band encircle the house, contrasting with the rough red brick. The brick was obtained locally from the Porter brick yards. more contrast is achieved with the straight exterior walls broken by the two-story bay windows on the east and front of the building. The front bay has George Brown's initials and date of construction in white limestone. Asymmetrical shapes are characteristic of the Queen Anne style. The architect, Cicero Hine, blended a variety of stone, from plain and decorative molded bricks, and limestone trim. Additional variation comes from the patterned wooden clapboards on the third floor balcony. The decorative variations in porches and balconies are highlighted by dormers, decorative gables and fanciful brackets under all the overhangs. Originally there was a wide veranda across the front and around the east side.

The interior reflects the Queen Anne style with an asymmetrical floor plan. Through the front doors is a large entry hall. The interior includes stained and etched glass windows, plaster corbels and arches. The fireplace is decorated in a flower motif of oak with a faux marble painted soapstone enclosure. Door lights are made of engraved glass. The third floor has a ballroom for formal dances. The third floor balcony is accessible from the dance floor.

The house was constructed on local materials, including Porter bricks and Jackson Township lumber. It included hot and cold running water, with a bathroom on the second floor, and a coal fired furnace.

== Gallery ==
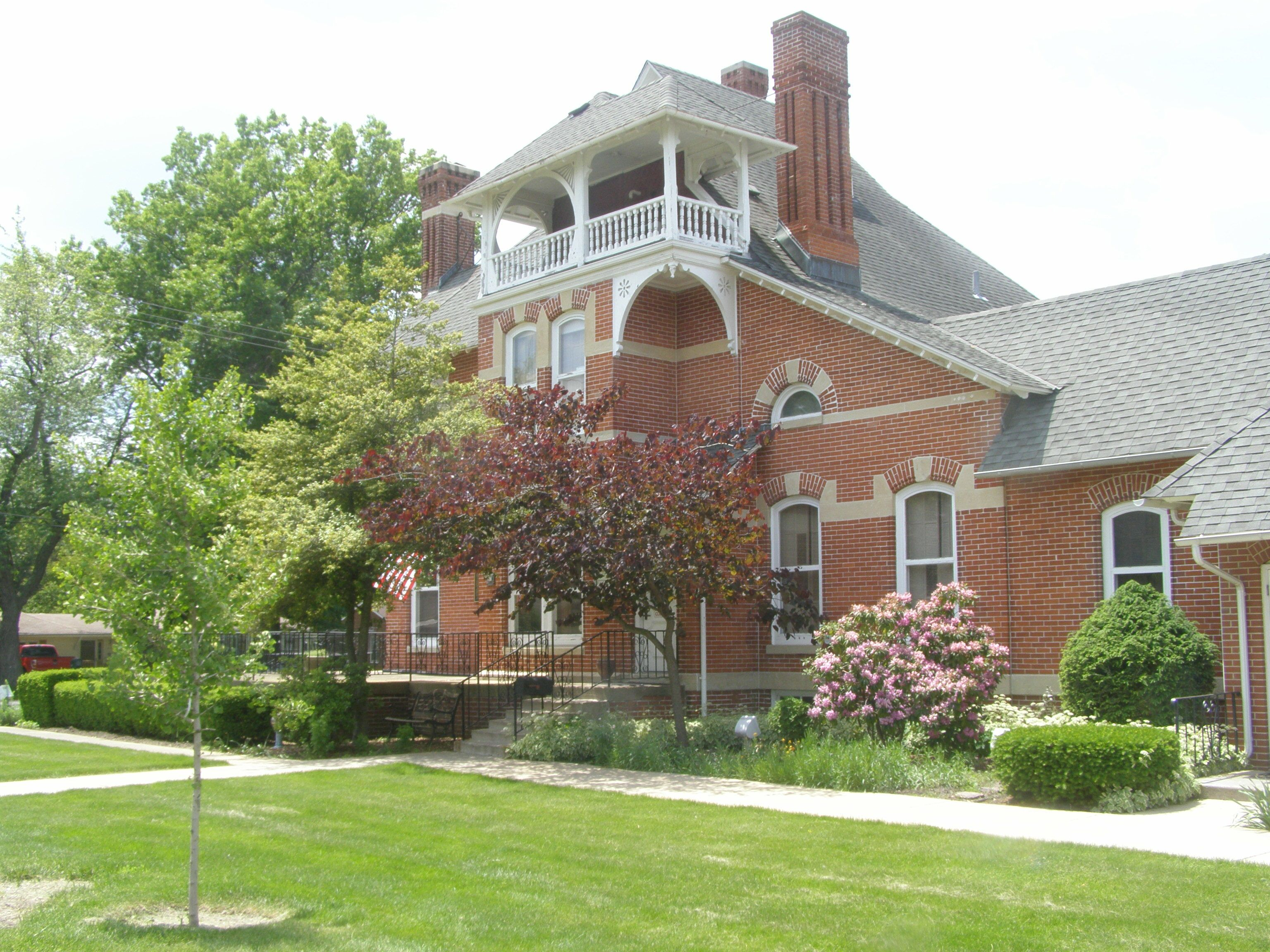
East Facade

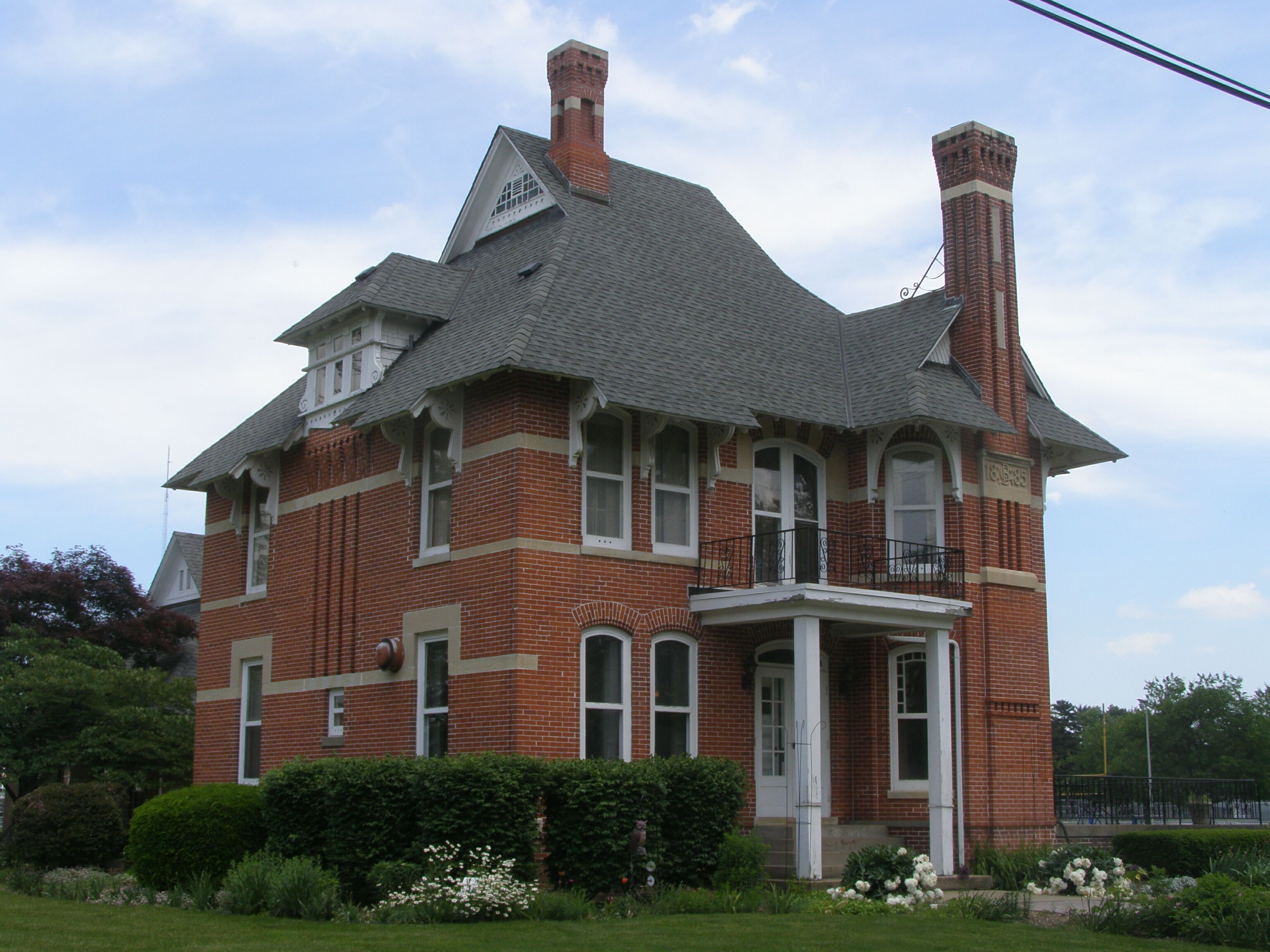
Southwest corner

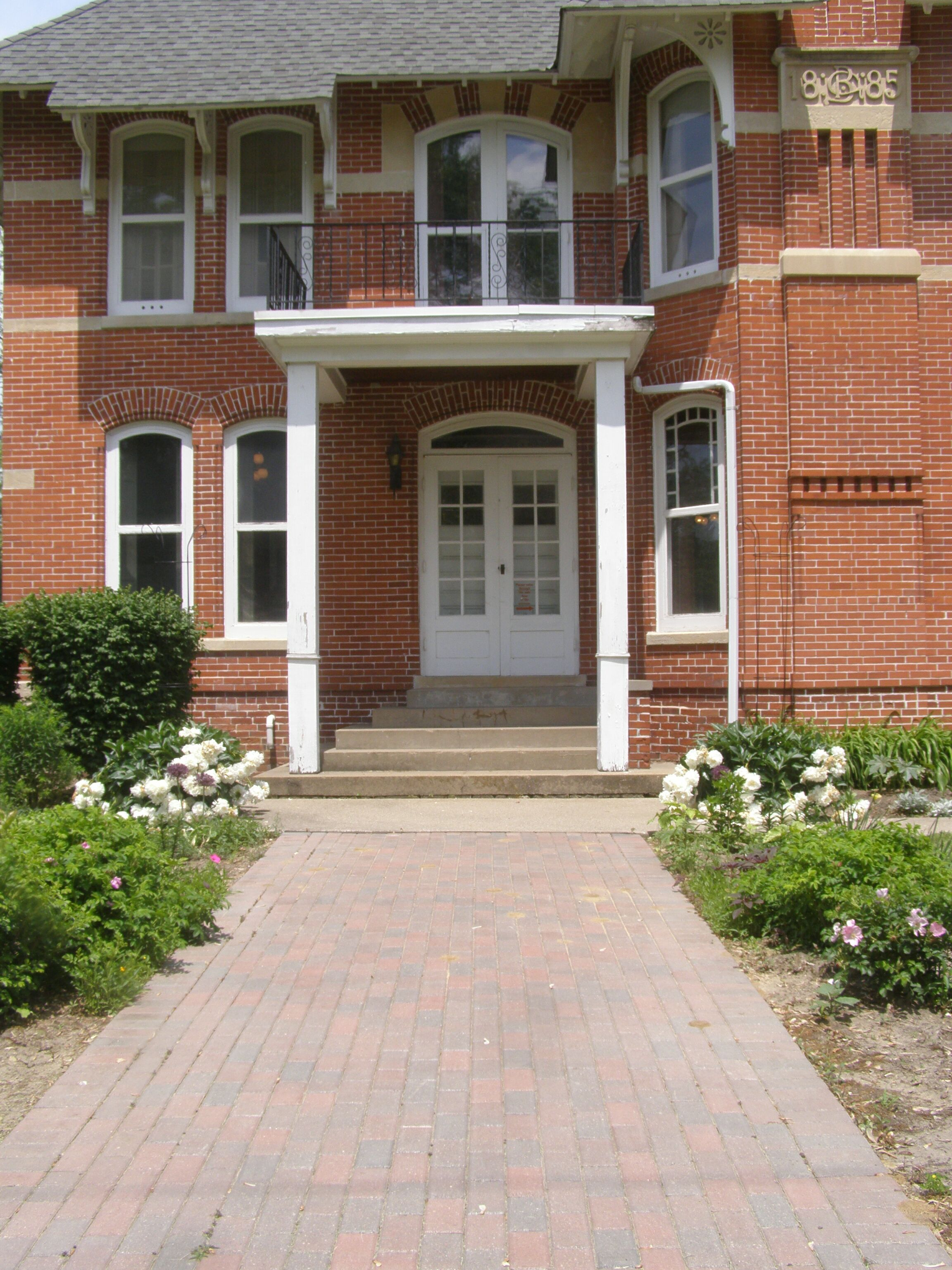
Main entrance

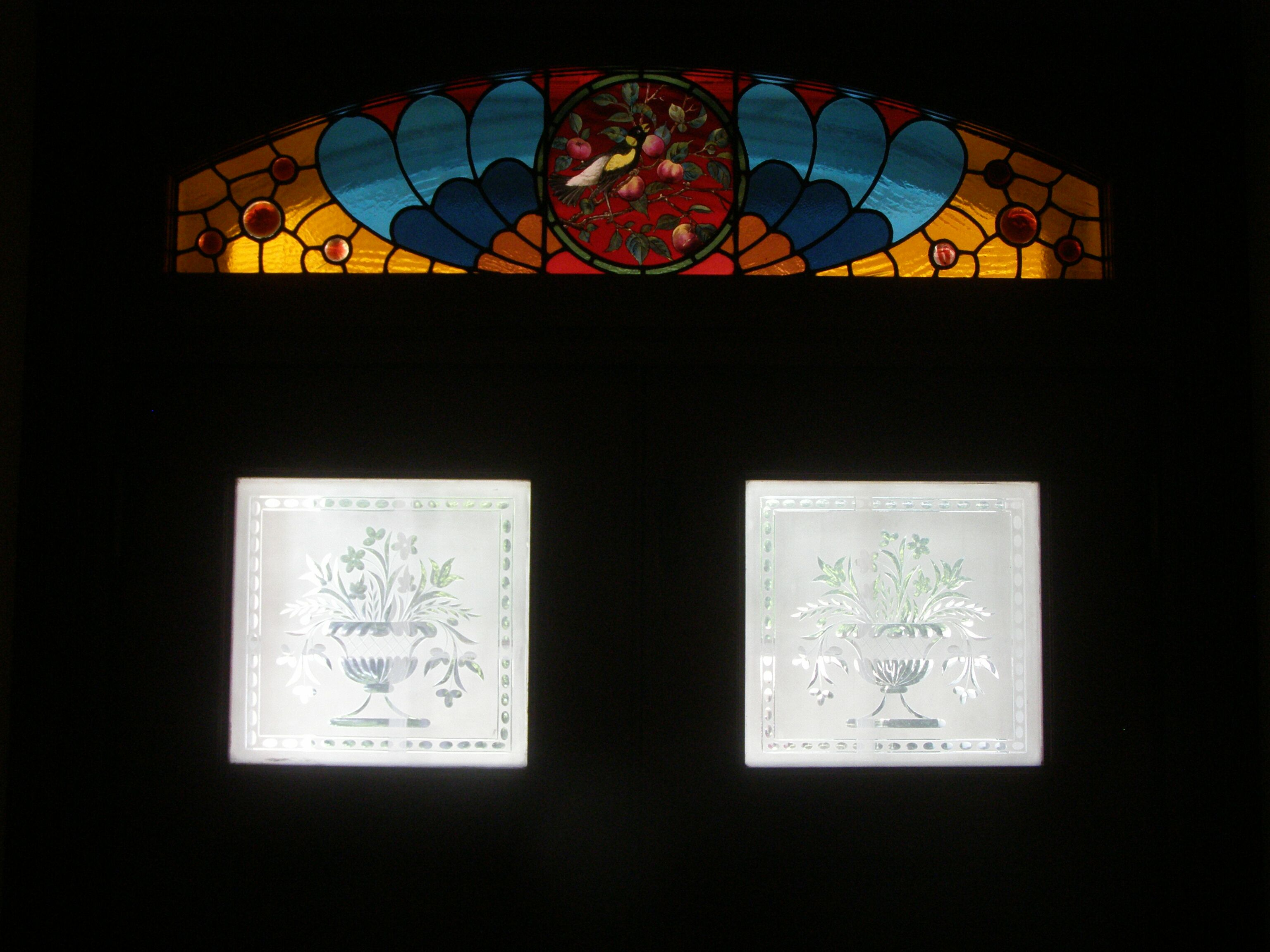
Fan light over front door;

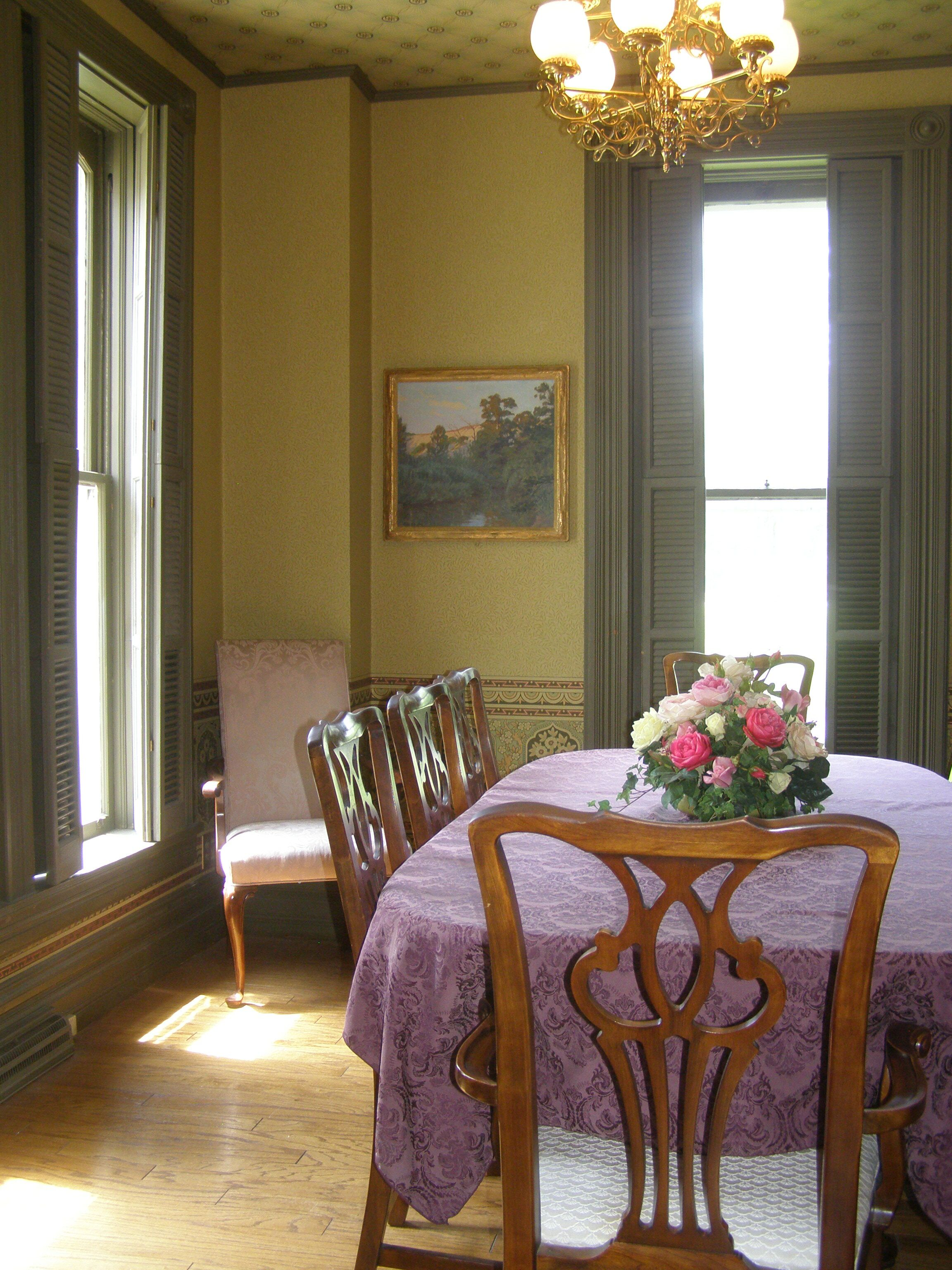
Dining Room

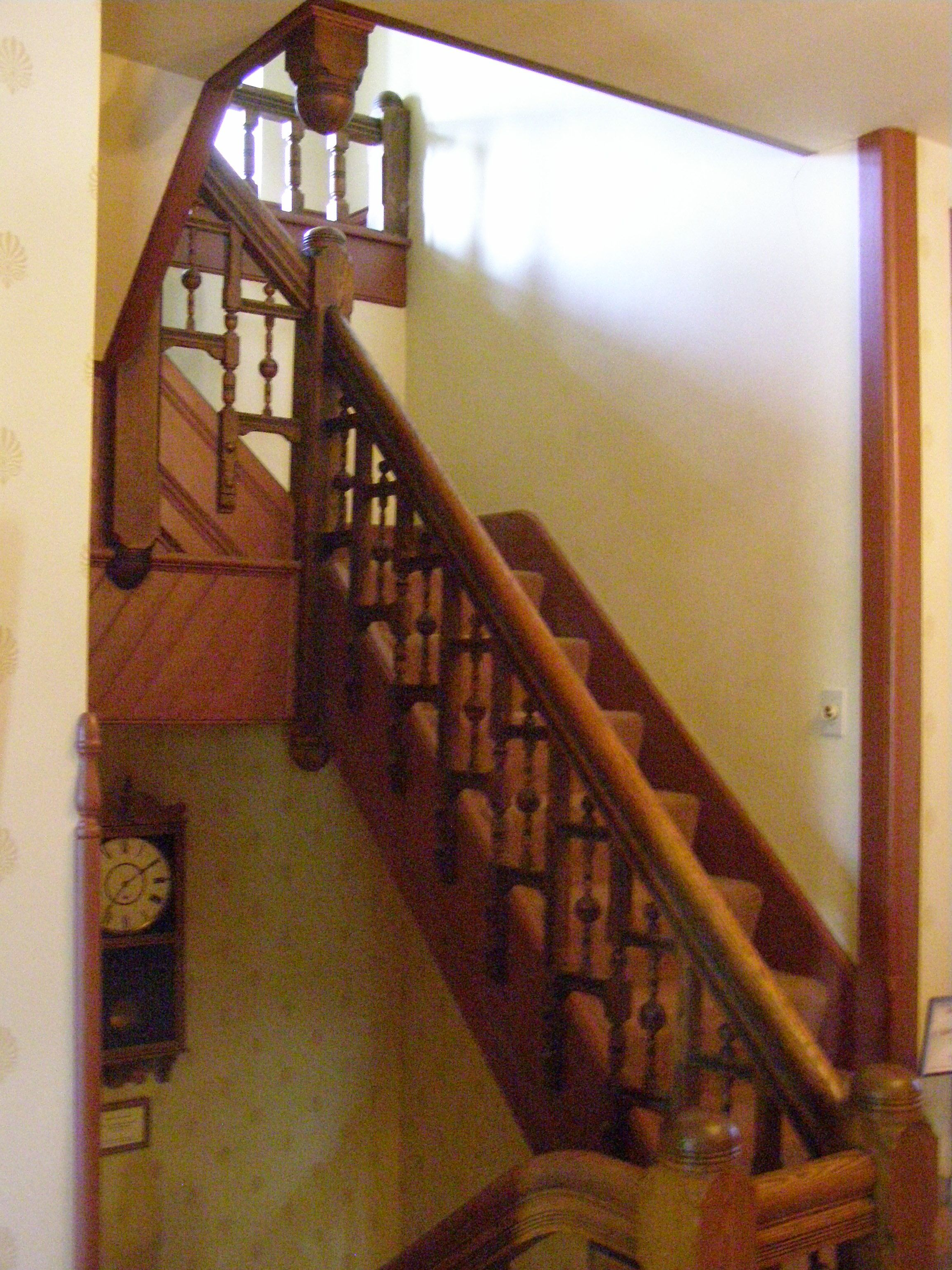
3rd Floor Stairway

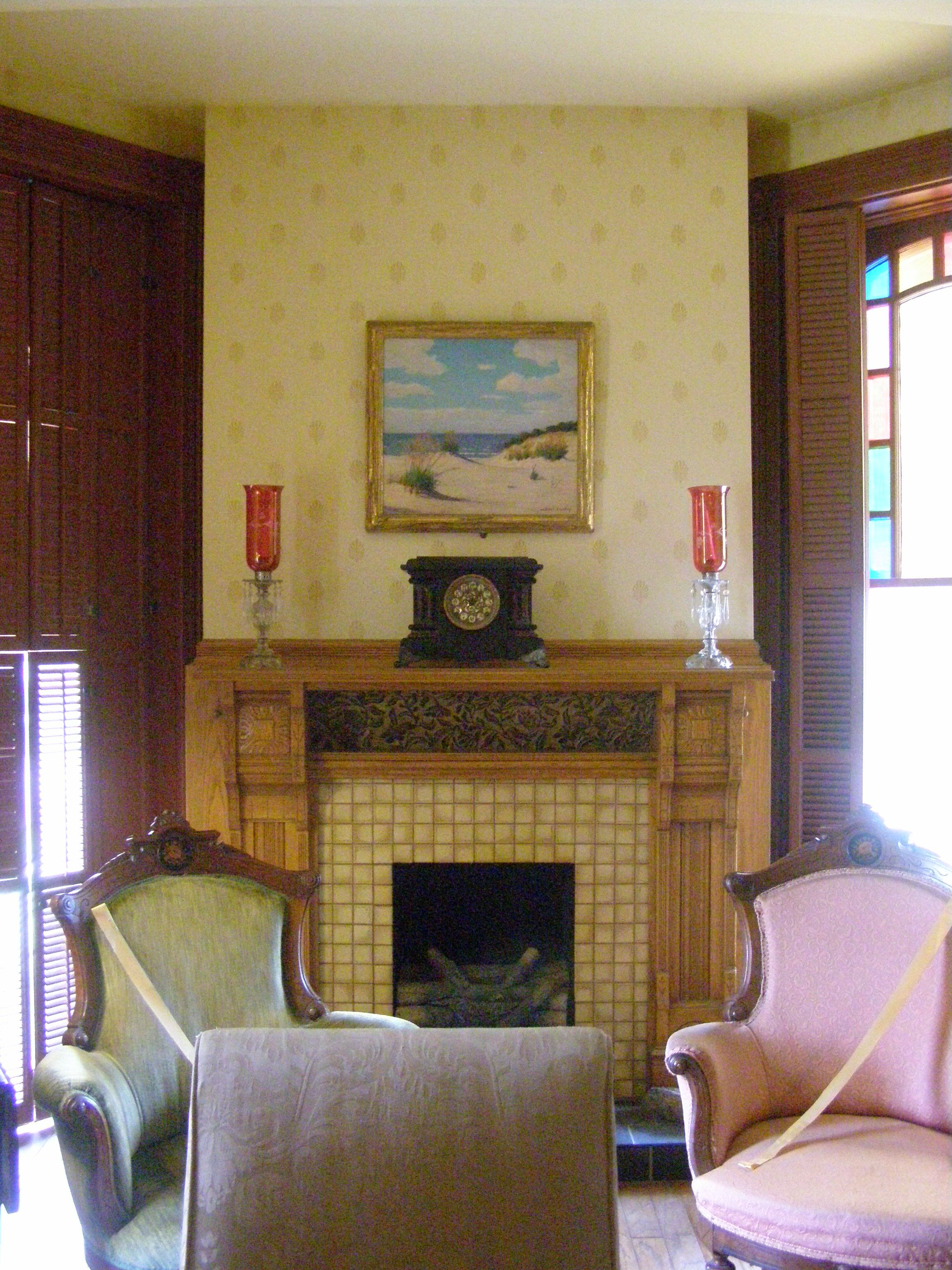
Parlor

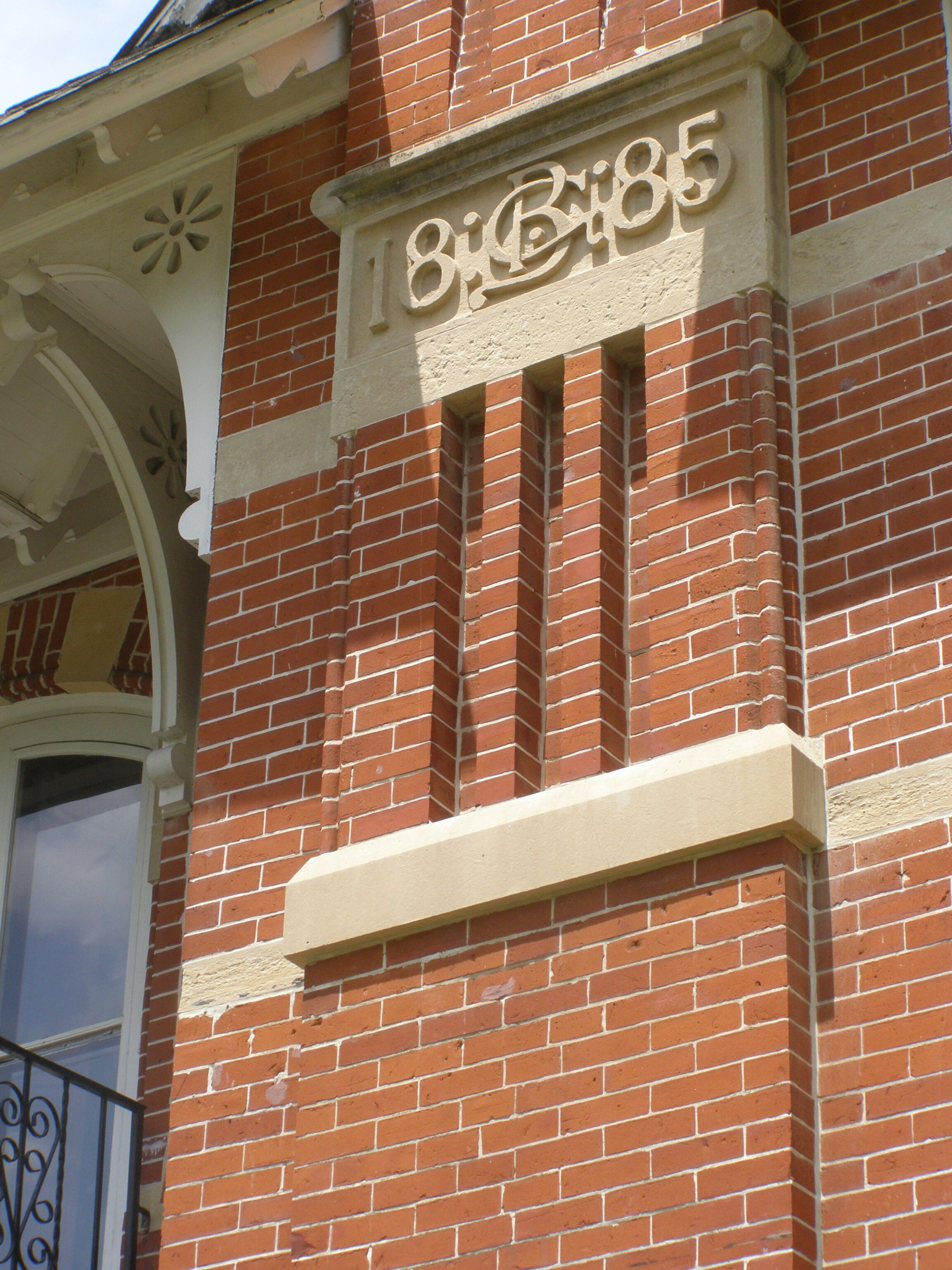
Carved date on Chimney

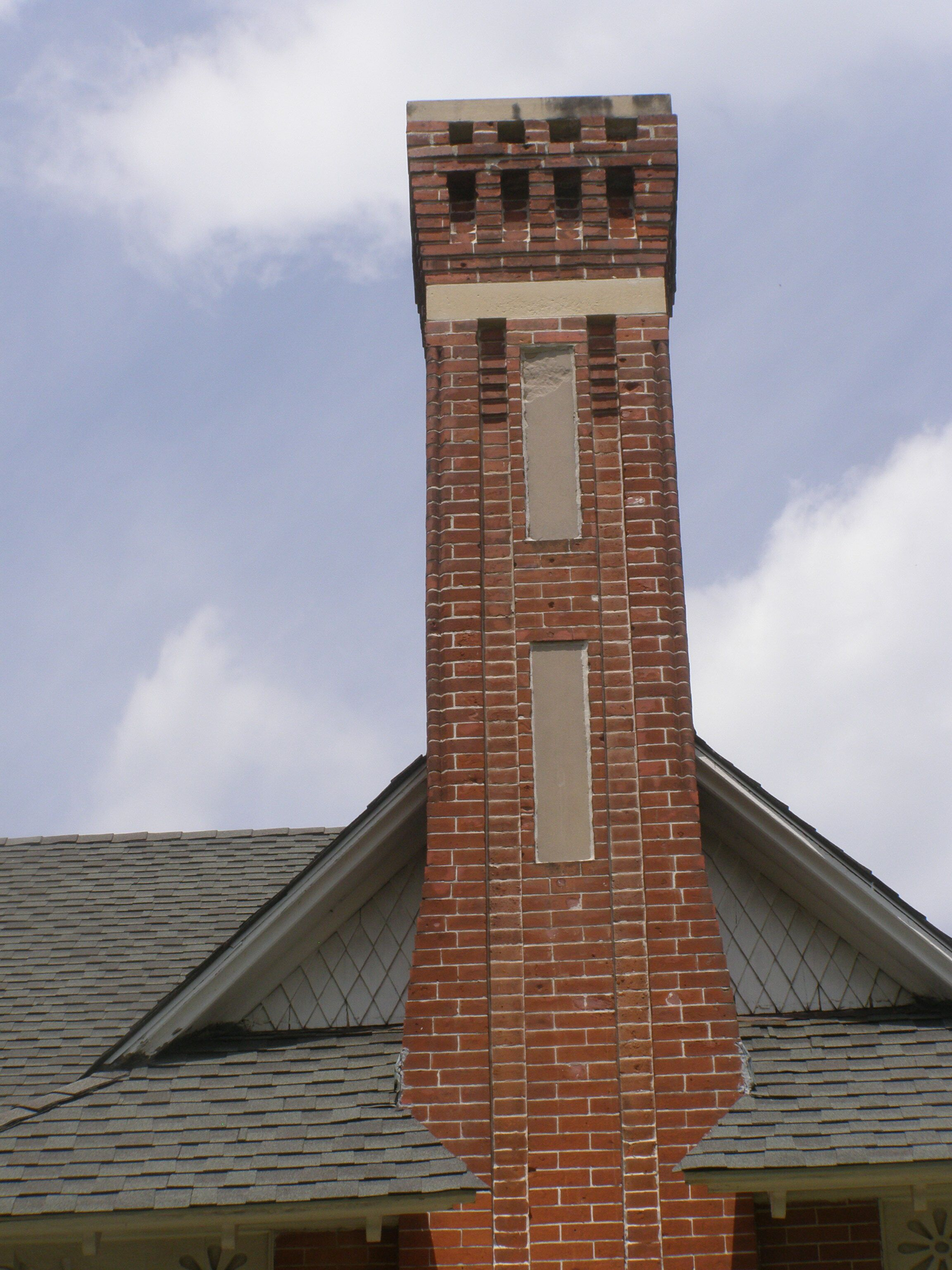
Chimney top

== National Register of Historic Sites ==
- Chesterton Commercial Historic District
- Chesterton Residential Historic District
- George Brown Mansion
- Norris and Harriet Coambs Lustron House
- New York Central Railroad Passenger Depot, Chesterton, Indiana
- Martin Young House
