= Martin Young House =

Historic house in Indiana, United States

- U.S. National Register of Historic Places
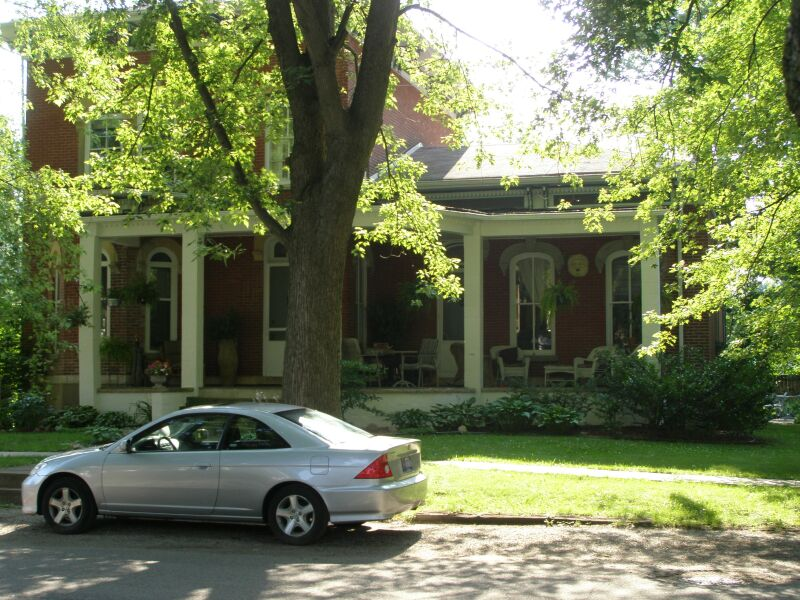
- summer 2010

- Location within Indiana Location within the United States
- Location: 324 Second St., Chesterton, Indiana
- Coordinates: 41°36′30″N 87°3′14″W
- Area: less than one acre
- Built: 1878
- Architect: Miles, Thomas J.
- Architectural style: Italianate
- NRHP reference No.: 07000208
- Added to NRHP: March 29, 2007

Martin Young shows up in the abstracts of several significant real estate transactions that provided for the growth of the town of Chesterton. He does not appear to have had a major role in the development on the town, except it apparently provided him with the means to build the Italianate home on Second Street. Young's prominence in the community began with the death of Cornelia Woods. She owned numerous acres on the south and southeast sides of downtown Chesterton since 1872. When she died in 1891, her five children from two marriages could not agree of the dispensation of the estate. In October, 1891 they reached a settlement and allowed Commissioner George Morgan to sell the property to Martin Young for $5,400. Young bought two parcels, one of 42.52 acres (17.21 ha) and the other of 14 acres (5.7 ha). “except one acre conveyed by grantors April 30, 1894 to the Chesterton Paint Manufacturing company”, this was the complete estate of Cornelia Woods. In 1907, the Chesterton Realty Company purchased the area east of Coffee Creek and platted the Morgan Park development. Martin Young received $8,220 for his land.

This "mansion" was built by Thomas Miles (1827 VA - 1893 Chesterton, IN) in 1878. (4/18/1878 Vidette Messenger) He was in Chesterton in 1880 with his wife Ellen (Morrical) Miles and six children. In 1889, Ellen left for Findlay, Ohio with the children. (12/13/1889 Chesterton Tribune) Martin Young bought the house in 1888 after Thomas Miles "met with a series of business reverses that rendered him bankrupt". Thomas Miles died July 1, 1893, and is buried in Chesterton cemetery with no gravestone. The obituary said he died "penniless." (7/7/1893 Chesterton) Today the house is known as the "Martin Young" house.

It was listed on the National Register of Historic Places in 2007.

== National Register of Historic Sites ==
- Chesterton Commercial Historic District
- Chesterton Residential Historic District
- George Brown Mansion
- Norris and Harriet Coambs Lustron House
- New York Central Railroad Passenger Depot, Chesterton, Indiana
- Martin Young House
