= Chesterton Commercial Historic District =

Historic district in Indiana, United States

- U.S. National Register of Historic Places
- U.S. Historic district
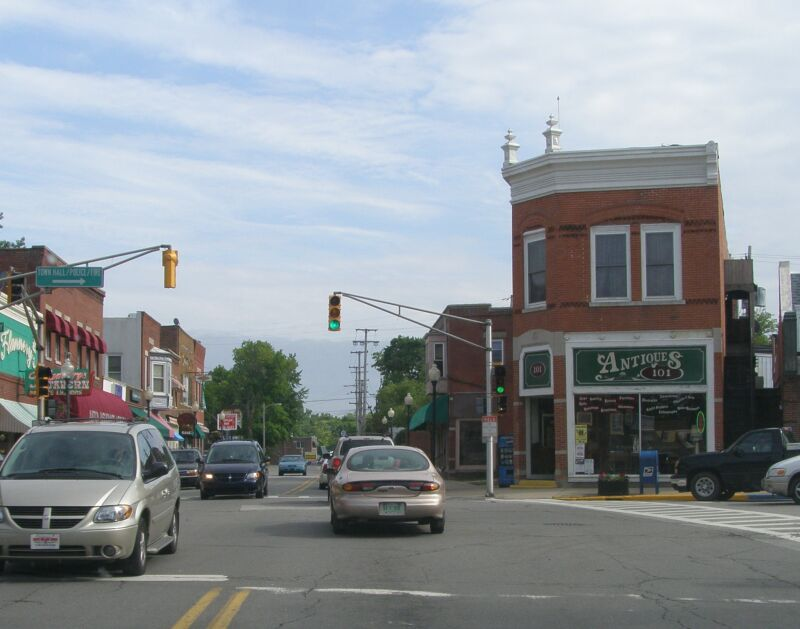
- I.O.O.F. Lodge (Antique Shop Building)

- Location within Indiana Location within the United States
- Location: 109–193 N. Calumet Rd. and 130–134 N. Calumet Rd., Chesterton, Indiana
- Coordinates: 41°36′39″N 87°3′8″W
- Area: 3.2 acres (1.3 ha)
- Built: 1902
- Architectural style: Italianate, Romanesque
- NRHP reference No.: 99001102
- Added to NRHP: September 9, 1999

The Chesterton Commercial Historic District is a historic district in Chesterton, Indiana.

Originally called Coffee Creek and located a little to the south of the current downtown, the name was changed some time after the post office was established in 1833 to Calumet, the river to the north. When the Lake Shore and Michigan Railroad came through the area in 1852, the town moved north to the current location and began to develop. The town's name was not changed to Chesterton until after the Civil War. There appears to have been confusion with Calumet, Illinois, further up the track.

The town's location along the railroad helped industry to grow. Soon, there was a cooperage, sawmills, a washing machine factory, and an organ company. Among the better examples of the towns growth are the commercial building on the southwest corner of Broadway and Calumet Rd, and the old Chesterton Tribune Building.

== Key buildings ==
All structures are historically contributing towards the Historic District Status, unless otherwise noted. An 'O' rating signifies that the structure had enough historic or architectural significance to be considered for individual listing in the National Register of Historic Places. The 'N' rating signifies that the structure is above average and may, with further investigation be eligible for an individual listing. The 'C' or contributing rating signifies that the structure meet the basic inventory qualifications, but fails to meet individual merit, but in combination with other closely placed similar structures warrants inclusion in an historic district.

- No. 1. 132–134 North Calumet Road, c. 1905, I.O.O.F Lodge – The International Order of Odd Fellows Lodge was built c. 1905, shortly after the devastating fire of 1902. The local chapter purchased this site in 1910, removed the original wood-frame building, and built this brick and stone trimmed building. While of no particular style, the oriel bay, cornice work, and heavy window lintels give the building a modest Neo-Classical Revival influence. The building is a rhomboid to fit the irregular block layout of the downtown.. The lodge used the upper floors of the building and rented the ground floor to shopkeepers. The wooden storefront configuration of large windows with wood frames and a recessed entry with wood single light door seems to be the original layout. The central and corner piers of brick banded with stone divide the storefront in halves. The south entry leads to a stairs to the upper floor. Taking advantage of the unusual lot, the storefront wraps around to the north side of the building with a single window to catch the eye of pedestrians up the street. The upper floor is hard fired dark brown face brick. The upper floor windows are one-over-one double hung windows with stone sills and lintels. Over the north half storefront, the second floor has a rectangular oriel window with simple classical ornamentation, and a double window to the front and narrow windows on the sides. The cornice has brick corbels at two points and a table of alternately recessed bricks, creating the impression of dentils. A stone coping caps the parapet, which crow steps down to the west or rear of the building. Datagraphic Printing is housed in the building.

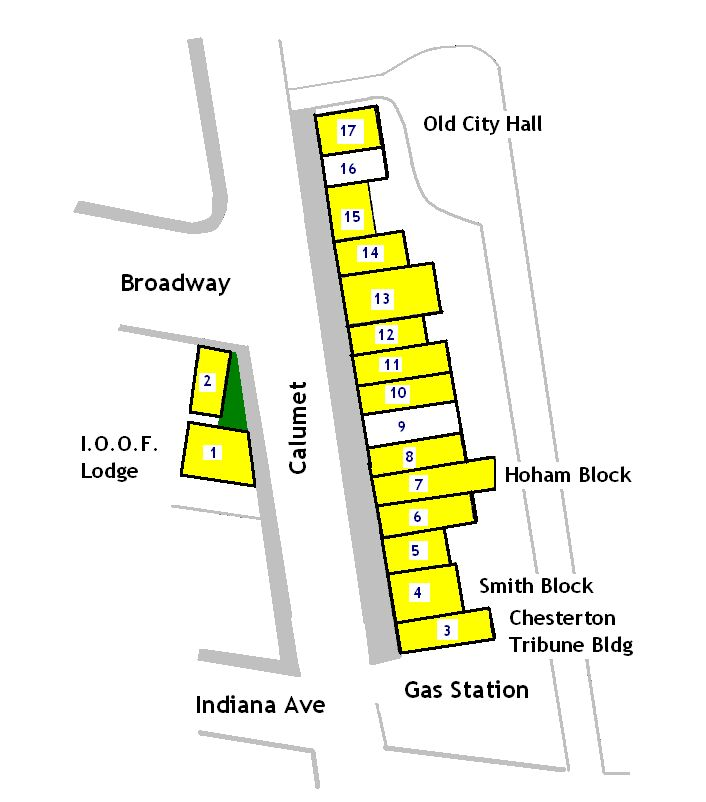
Based on map provided in the National Register of Historic Places Registration Application.

- No. 2. 130 North Calumet Road or 101 Broadway, c. 1895, The Queen Anne commercial building on the southwest corner of Broadway and Calumet Road was built c. 1895. In 1888, Elias Thomas built a brick building here. In 1898, the store was rebuilt by Myron and Harry Smith who operated a general dry goods store called M. Smith and Son. His son Harry operated the store until his death in 1961. Harry's son Richard continued the business until 1973. This building has a flat-iron shape and the entry bay wall and second floor above is chambered. The chambered face of the storefront has double leaf wood doors with a wood transom above. The lintel over the doorway is sentimental arch shaped and has scroll shaped corner blocks supporting it. The brick corner piers flanking the door have stone banding. Steel or iron I-beam lintels with rosettes span the tops of the side storefronts, which have wood framed large windows and transoms. The flank of the building along Calumet Road has a row of small multi-pane windows set high on the wall. Each has a stone sill and sentimental arched, multi-coursed arches top each square headed window. A double row of saw tooth-laid brick link the window arches. On the second floor, full size one-over-one double hungs march along the Calumet Road side, each with a stone sill and sawtooth coursing linking the sills and arches. The arches on the second floor are header multi-coursed with a projecting extrados course forming a hood. The north elevation facing Broadway has a double window on the second floor with a single broad arch over both windows. Decorative balusters with finials stand atop the entrance chambered bay and the end of the building facing Calumet.

The bulk of the historic district in on the east side of Calumet Road. The southern end of the district starts across from Indiana Ave. It runs north to the tracks.

- No. 3. 193 North Calumet Road, c. 1905, The Chesterton Tribune Building is the most southern building and was built c. 1905 after the great fire of 1902. It is considered a Twentieth Century function style, similar to most of the buildings in the district. The Chesterton Tribune commissioned construction of this building in 1904 and it continues to serve as the paper's headquarters. Arthur Bowser first published the paper in 1884 * and he owned the paper when the decision was made to build this structure. It is a two-story brick commercial building. The ground floor storefront has been altered; stucco covers the kick panels and piers. An old-fashioned style simple cloth awning covers the storefront. The original steel or iron I-beam spanning the ground floor remains intact along with the decorative rosettes. The red brick walls rise above the I-beam and three windows puncture the wall, each with dressed stone sills and lintels. Centered over the windows, a stone tablet reads "The Chesterton Tribune". The elaborate parapet gives the building a slight Romanesque Revival style flavor. First, a beltcourse of sawtooth-laid brick runs across, then a frieze of alternating recessed single bricks. The raised brick corbels dividing the upper parapet into four panels mimic machicolations, with infilling of progressively corbeled courses of brick. J.G. Graessle bought the paper from Bowser in 1923, Warren Canright purchased it in 1928, and held the paper until his death in 1975. His son Warren and grandson David continue to publish the Tribune out of the building. The Tribune is the oldest existing business in Chesterton, and still publishes daily except for Sundays.,
- No. 4. 139–141 North Calumet Road, 1903, The Smith Block was also built c. 1905.[2] The Smith Block was constructed in 1903. The first floor housed various businesses while the Knights of Pythias Lodge used the second floor as their meeting hall from 1903 until 1968. The local Knights of Columbus lodge has occupied the space since 1969. The first floor storefront seems to be a c. 1950 remodeling, utilizing aluminum and glass doors and muntins to hold the large plate glass shop windows. It seems that the recessed central entry configuration was retained from the original storefront design, due to the placement of the structural columns. The storefront end piers of brick and stone are original. The second floor tan face brick walls have an Arts and Crafts feeling, especially in the use of the central Chicago window. The parapet area has three recessed brick panels with stone corner tabs, the center panel has a stone tablet with raised letters spelling "SMITH BLOCK" in a simple sans-serif typeface. A table of stone corbels runs across above the panels. The rest of the parapet is plain brick.
- No. 5. 137A North Calumet Road, c. 1905, This building was constructed to replace one of those lost in the 1902 fire. The ground floor has been altered with residential style windows and wood siding. The upper floor has three windows, each having rock-faced stone lintels and sills. The cornice has a few simple flourishes; first comes a belt course of red terra cotta blocks with bulls-eyes cast into them, then a course of cyma reverse-molded brick topped by a rock-faced coping.
- No. 6. 137B North Calumet Road, c. 1905, This small story shop was home to a barber shop until the 1960s. The wooden storefront seems to be original, with recessed kick panels below a large wood framed window, and the recessed entrance set to the north with single light wood door. The metal awning is from the 1950s. The face brick walls have two double recessed panels on the parapet and a stone coping.
- No. 7. 135 North Calumet Road, c. 1900, The Hoham Block is two buildings to the north and is also a c. 1905 Twentieth Century Functional style. The Hoham Block is a two-story brick and stone commercial building. In 1903, Bennett Morgan constructed this building as a hardware store. He and his son Robert operated the store until Bennett died in 1974. The double recessed entrance storefront seems to have some original features and others dating from perhaps the 1930s. The iron corner piers are original, the doorways appear to be original, but the metal framing and edging for the shop windows seems to be a Moderne style replacement. The upper floor face brick walls have two bays, one wood double hung window with stone sill and lintel, and an oriel window. The semihexagonal bay has pressed metal kick panels and entablature, both have Classical swag and floral motifs. A stone tablet with raised letters spelling "HOHAM BLOCK" is centered over the window and oriel. The cornice has a lower sawtooth course of brick, a run of alternately recessed brick, fake machicolations, and a three course corbel table with stone coping. The sides of the building always stood above its neighbors and have several operable windows. Country Loft Crafts occupies this store currently.
- No. 8. 133 North Calumet Road, c. 1940, this one story shop was once used by neighboring Morgan Hardware. It has a c. 1940 inwardly angled shop front with aluminum and glass central door framed by brick end piers. The parapet wall is plain face brick with dressed stone coping.
- No. 9. Non-contributing – 131 North Calumet Road, c. 1935, After the 1902 fire, this site lay vacant until 1935, when Walter Baur built this store. The building is covered in wood siding and considered non-contributing. It may still have the original brick detailing beneath the siding
- No. 10. 129 North Calumet Road, 1903, A local butcher rebuilt on this site after the 1902 fire, and used this building until the 1940s. In its craft details and original intent, this building is virtually the same as 137 A North Calumet (#5). Only the alterations make it significantly different.
- No. 11. 127 North Calumet Road, 1902, Hess Restaurant and Hotel used this building from 1902 until 1920. From 1920 until recent years, Johnson Grocery Store occupied the building. Anton Insurance Company now utilizes this building and the neighboring block at 129 Calumet. 127 is a two-story, three bay commercial block. The first story shop front was remodeled in c. 1950. The front is angled inward in a single plane, with two shop windows to the south and a double entry to the north. The kick panel area is brick and the doors and windows are framed in brushed natural metal (likely aluminum). The second floor has three windows with stone sills and lintels. The cornice has false machicolations and corbeled brick courses.
- No. 12. 125 North Calumet Road, 1903, The same craftsman responsible for the masonry work on 129 and 137 Calumet may have built the cornice treatment for 125, since the same bulls-eye terra cotta block and cyma-reversa molded brick work links all three buildings visually. The building at 125 is different from the other two in that it is only a one-story building. The owners of Flannery's Tavern remodeled the storefront significantly in the 1940s or 50s with large banks of glass block, fixed picture windows and a metal awning. The upper parapet section of brick has been painted, and the neon sign is likely from the 1950s. The cornice has been painted also. A saloon stood here as early as the 1880s. After the fire of 1902, the owners rebuilt a saloon on this site. From 1910 to 1915, Jeffrey's Motion Pictures (only silent films at the time) was located here. A pool hall used the building from about 1915 until the mid-1930s, when Flannery's Tavern opened.
- No. 13. 123 North Calumet Road, This one story brick building was one of few to withstand the devastating fire of 1902. It was built as Lowenstine Clothing Store in 1898 and purchased by Charles A. Smith about 1908, when Lowenstine moved to Valparaiso. Smith operated the store until the early 1960s when it was sold to Falvey's Men's Store.
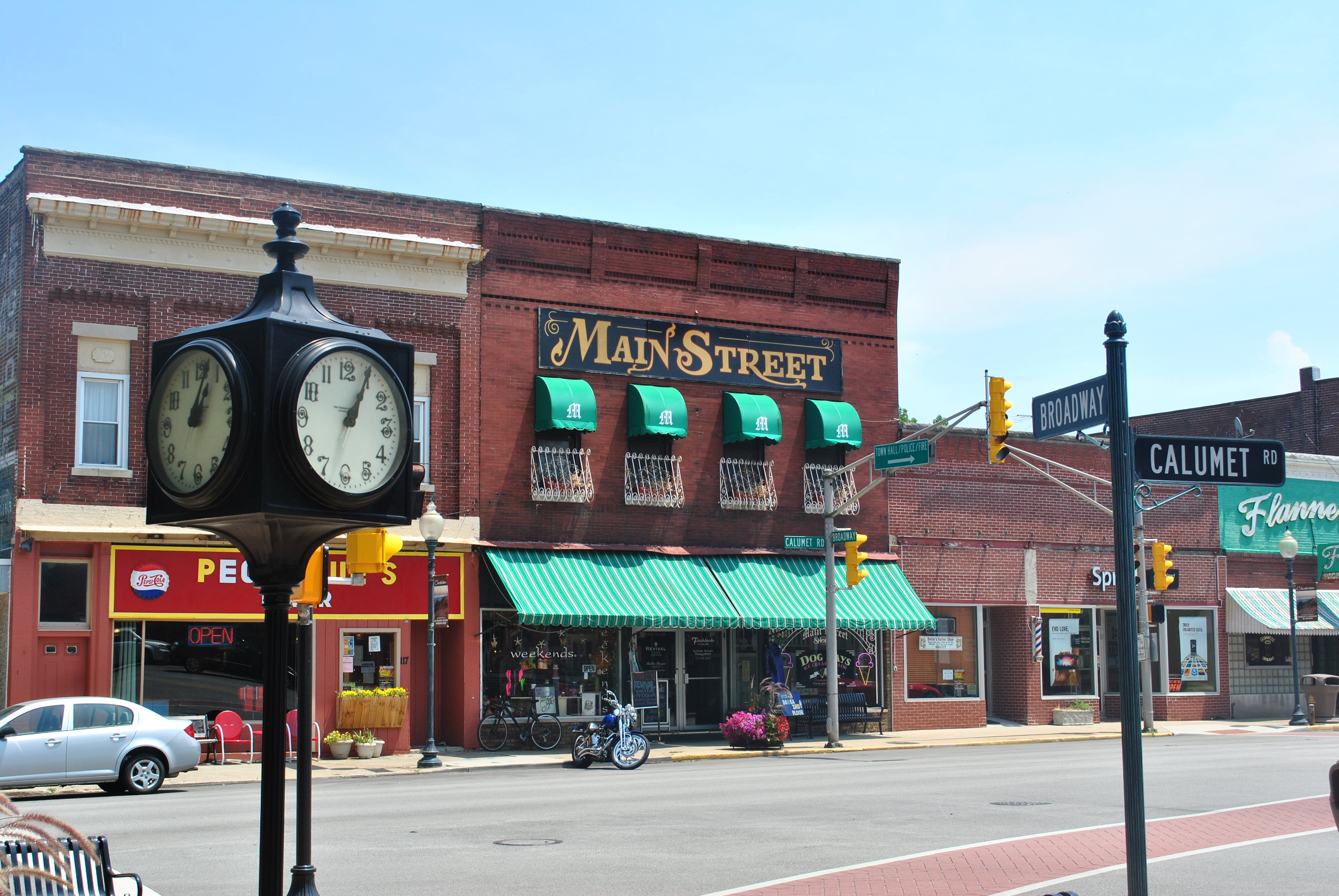
MainStreet Building located in center of downtown Chesterton, Indiana

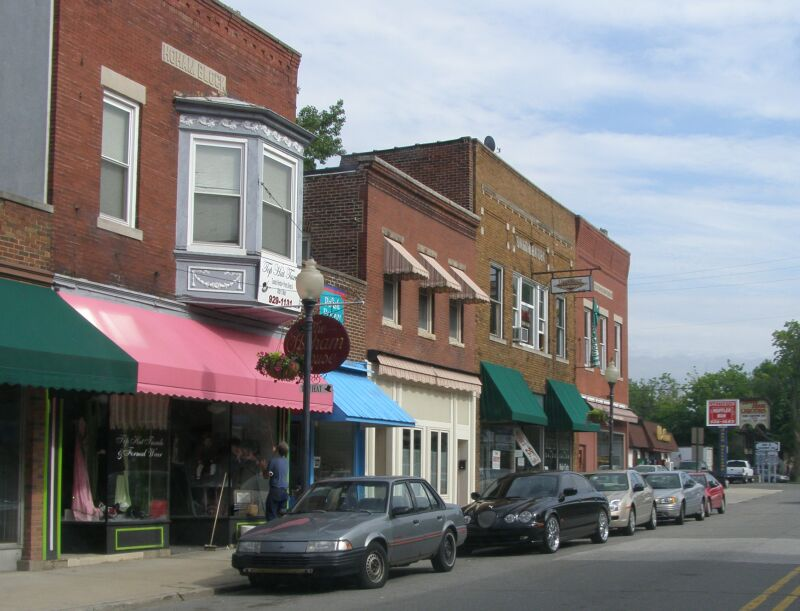
Hohman Block with Smith and Tribune Blocks together at the end of the row

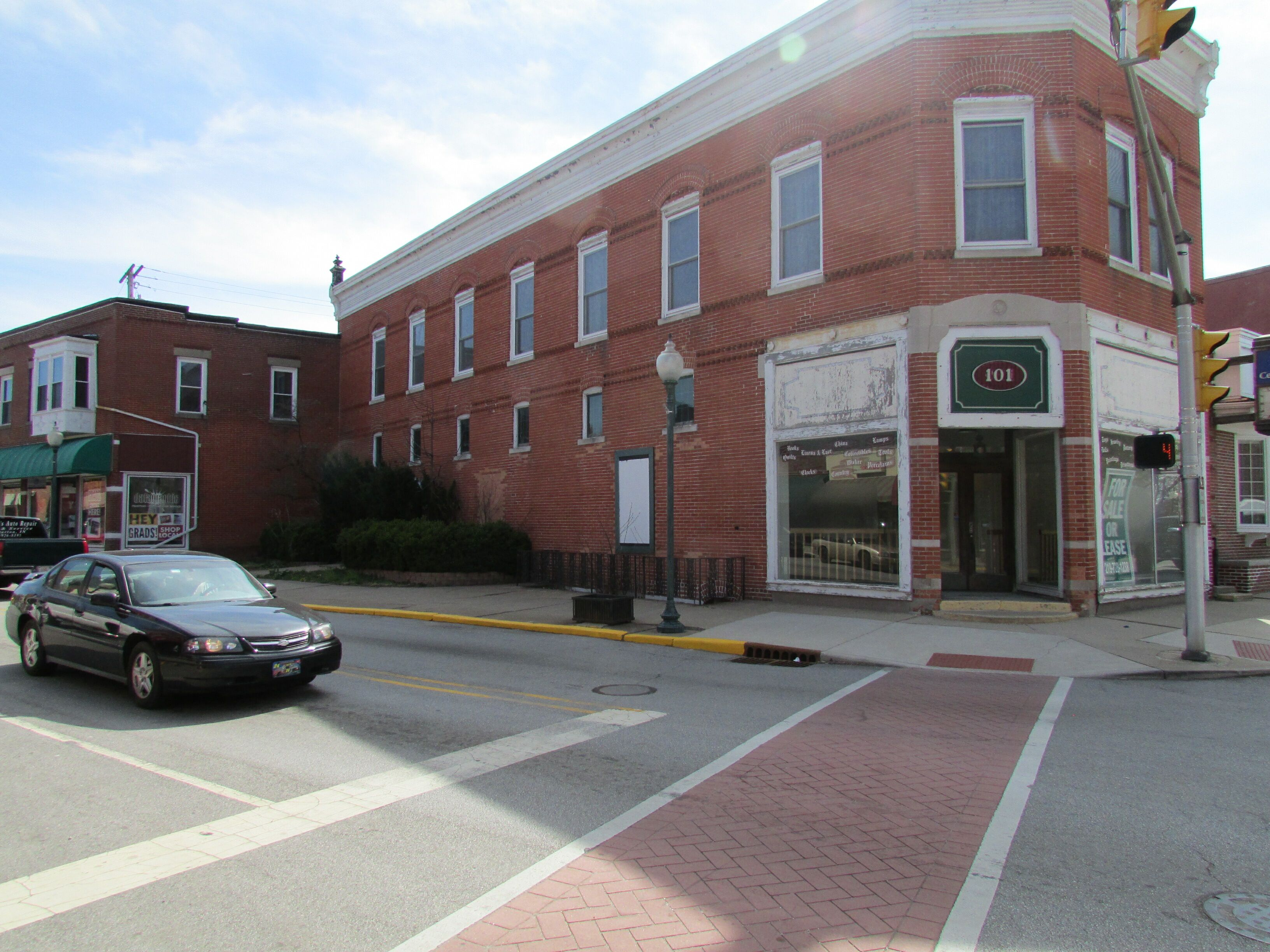
Commercial building on the southwest corner of Broadway and Calumet Road was built c. 1895

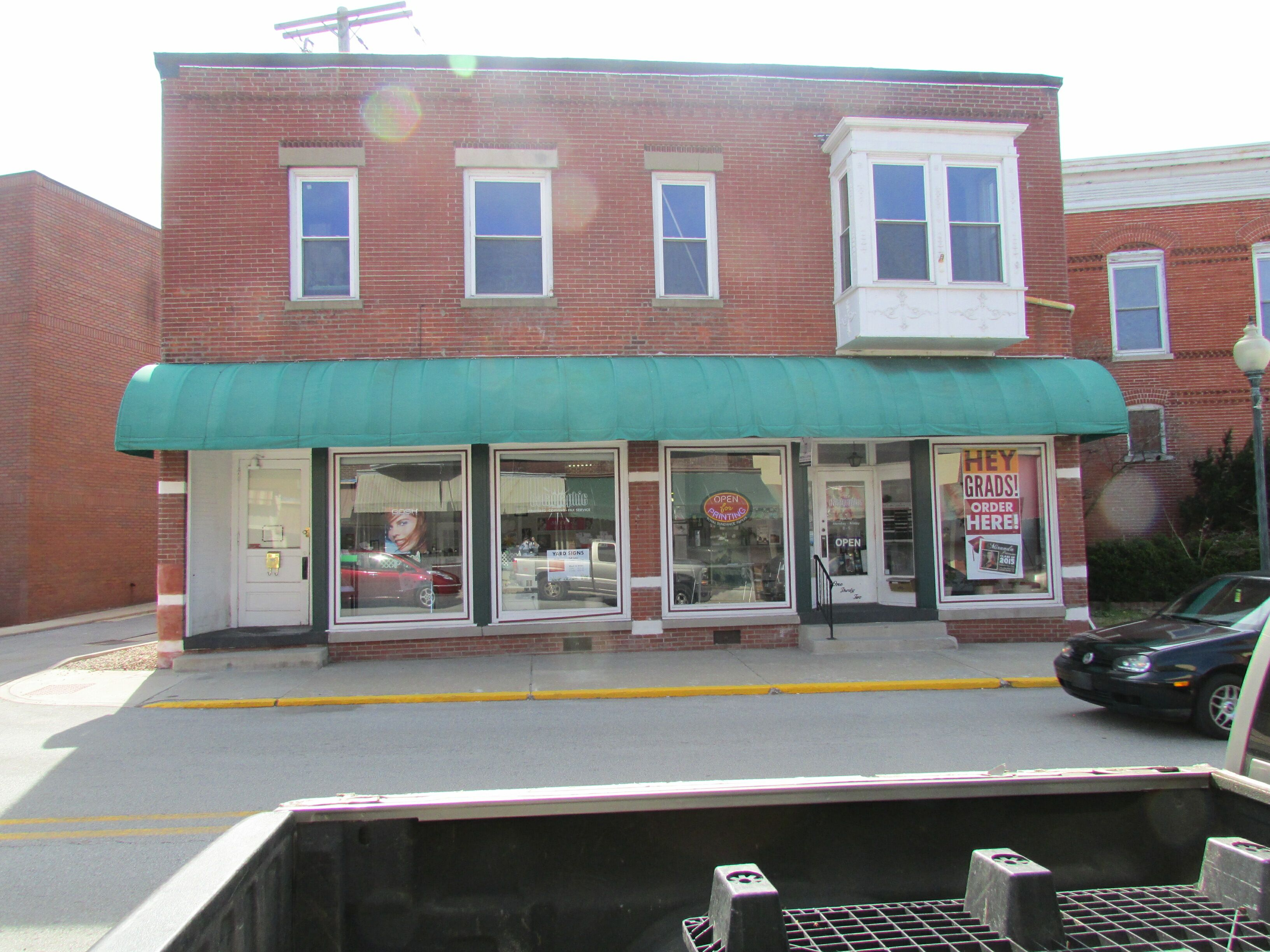
The Independent Order of Odd Fellows Lodge was built c. 1900

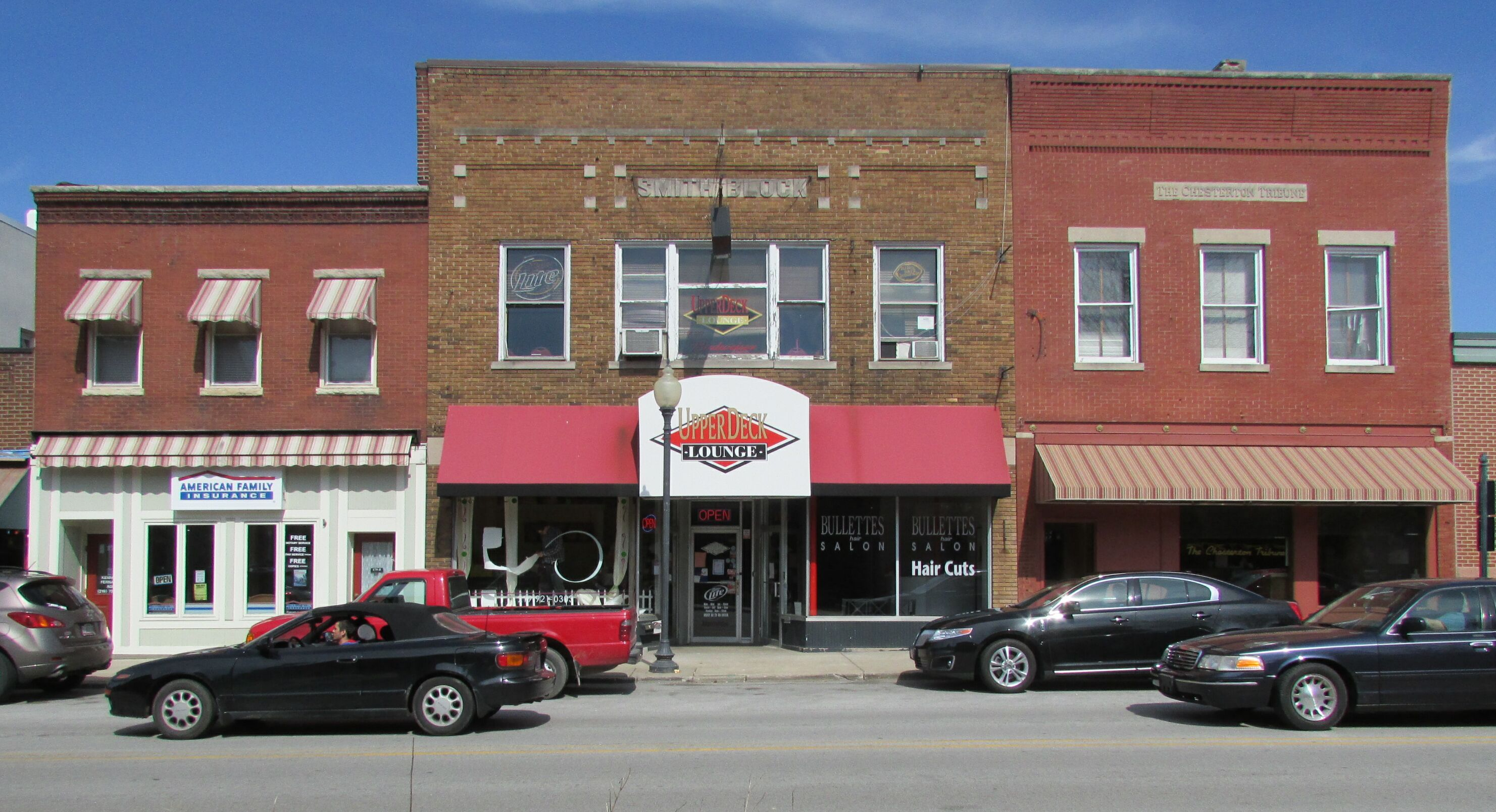
Smith Block was also built c. 1905

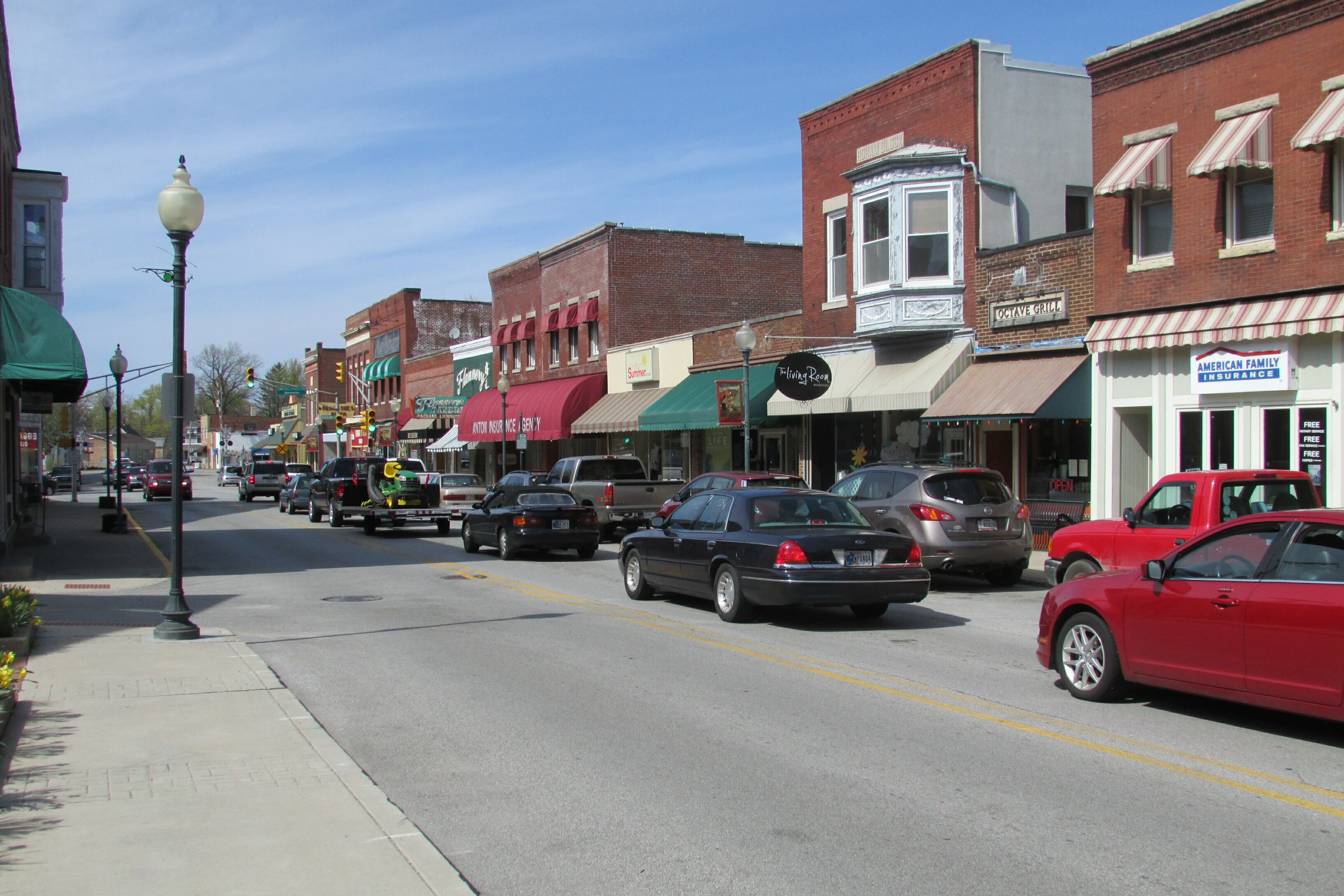
Chesterton Downtown Historic District

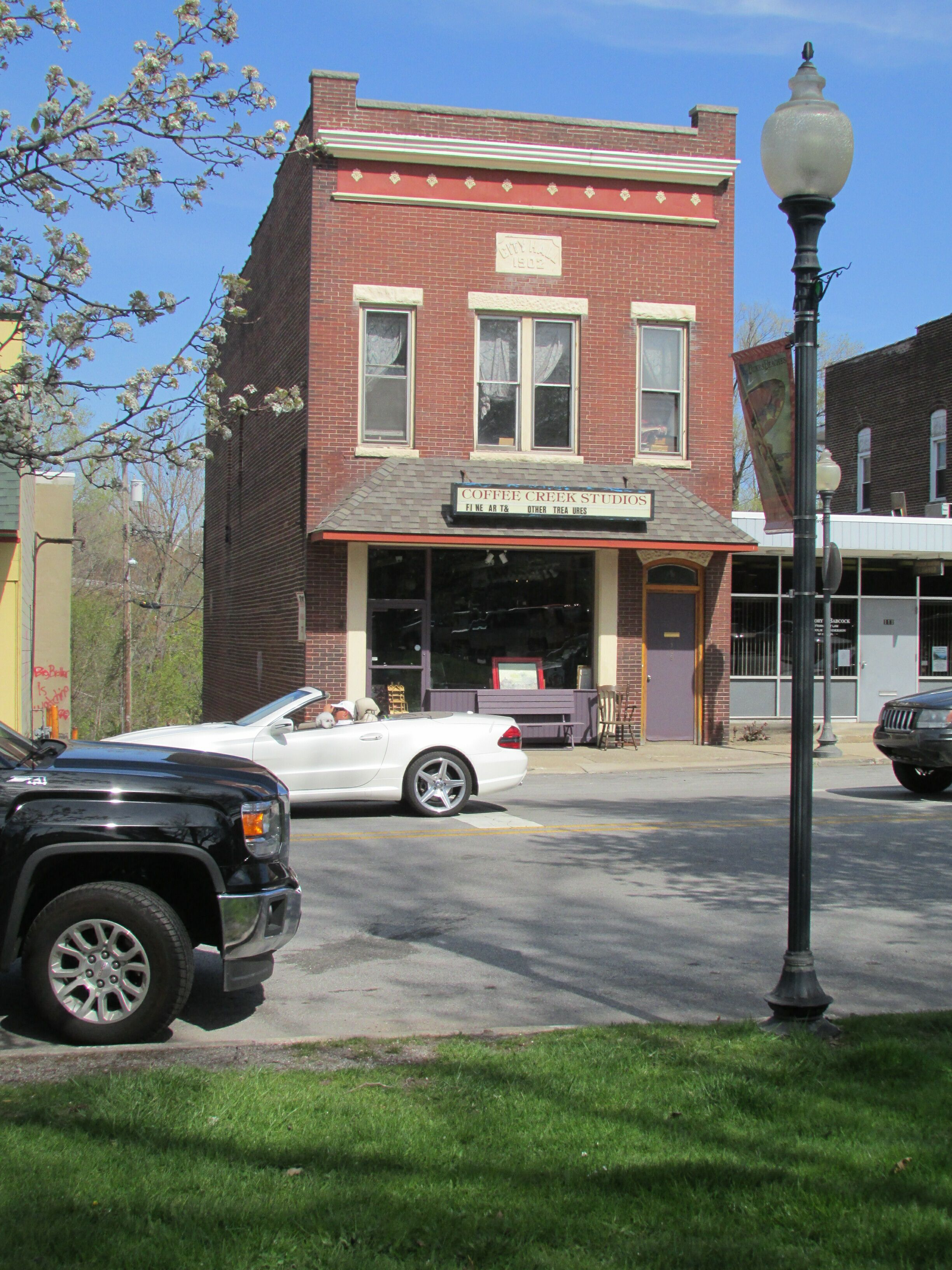
Chesterton City Hall, c. 1902

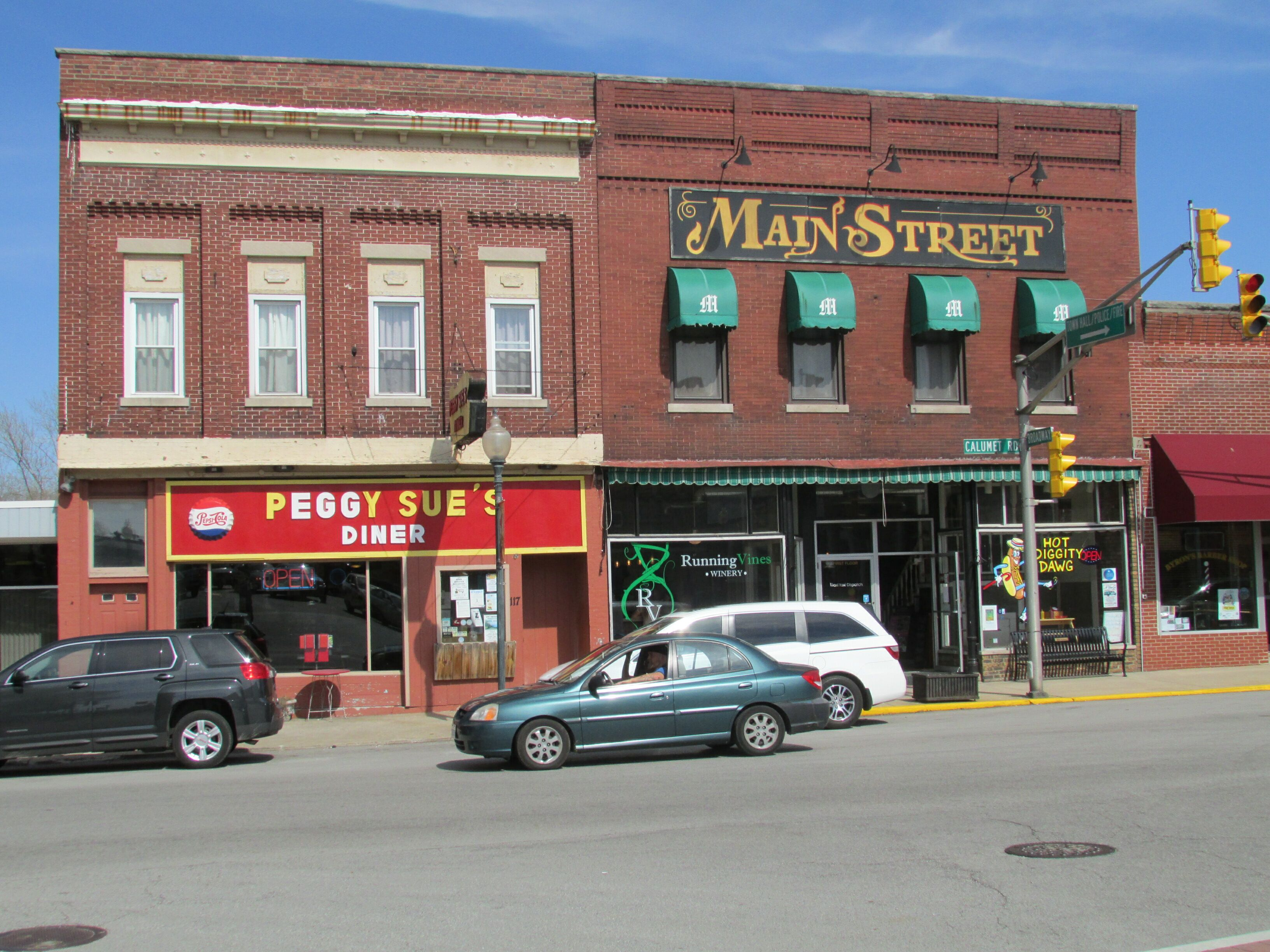
Main Street blocks.

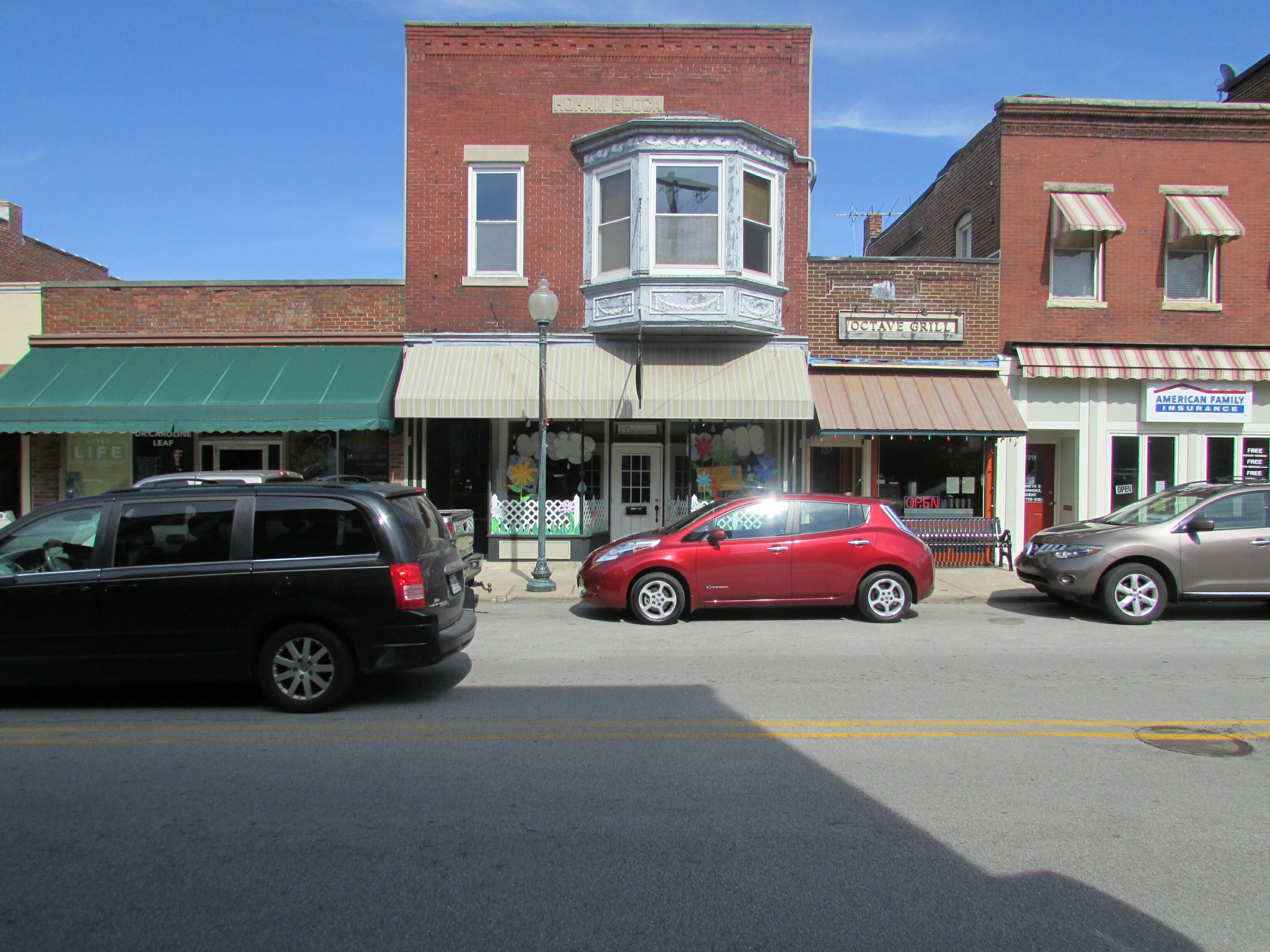
Hoham Block is two buildings to the north and is also a c. 1905

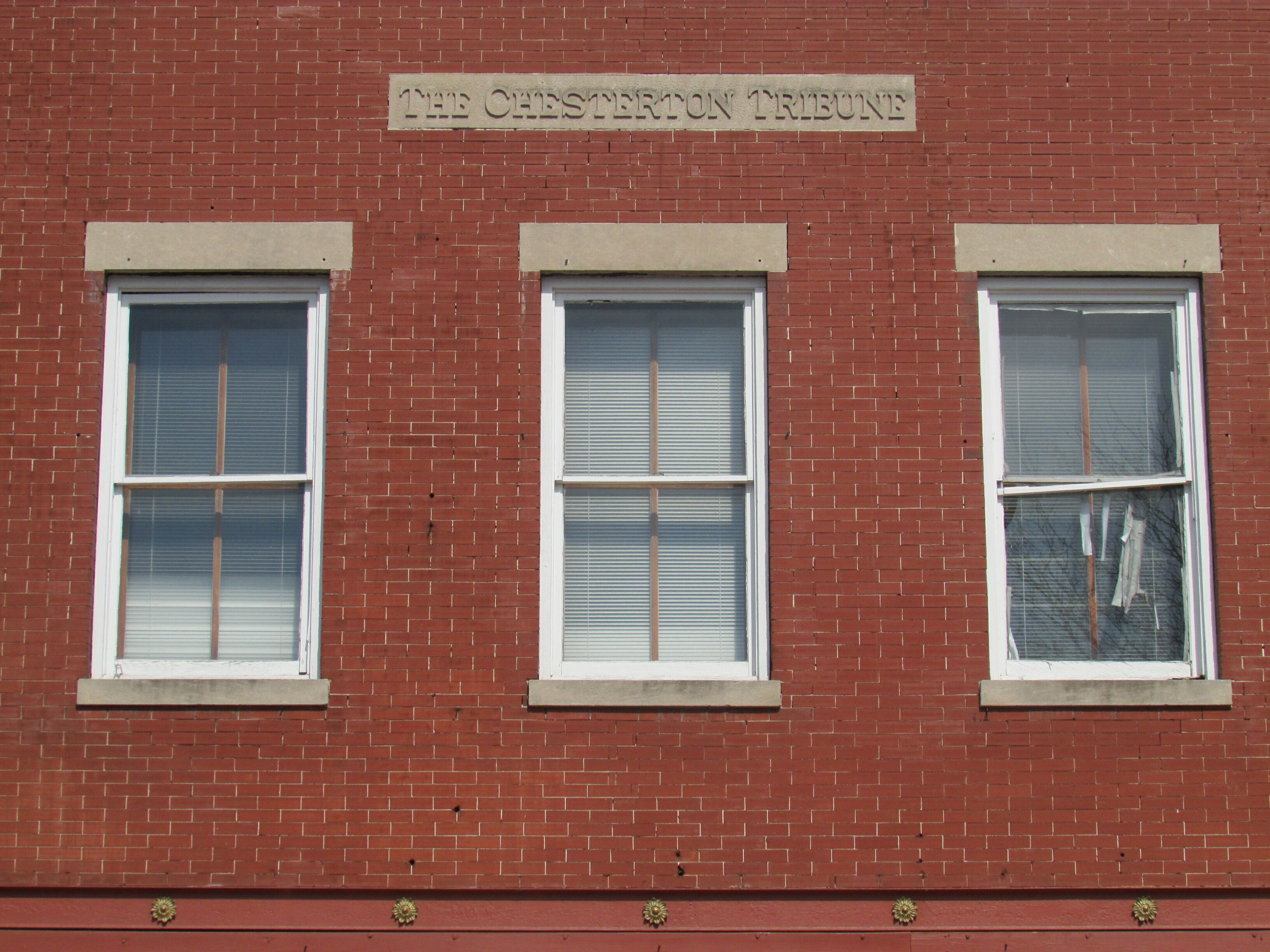
Chesterton Tribune, 1905

== National Register of Historic Sites ==
- Chesterton Commercial Historic District
- Chesterton Residential Historic District
- George Brown Mansion
- Norris and Harriet Coambs Lustron House
- New York Central Railroad Passenger Depot, Chesterton, Indiana
- Martin Young House
