= Chesterton Residential Historic District =

Historic district in Indiana, United States

- U.S. National Register of Historic Places
- U.S. Historic district
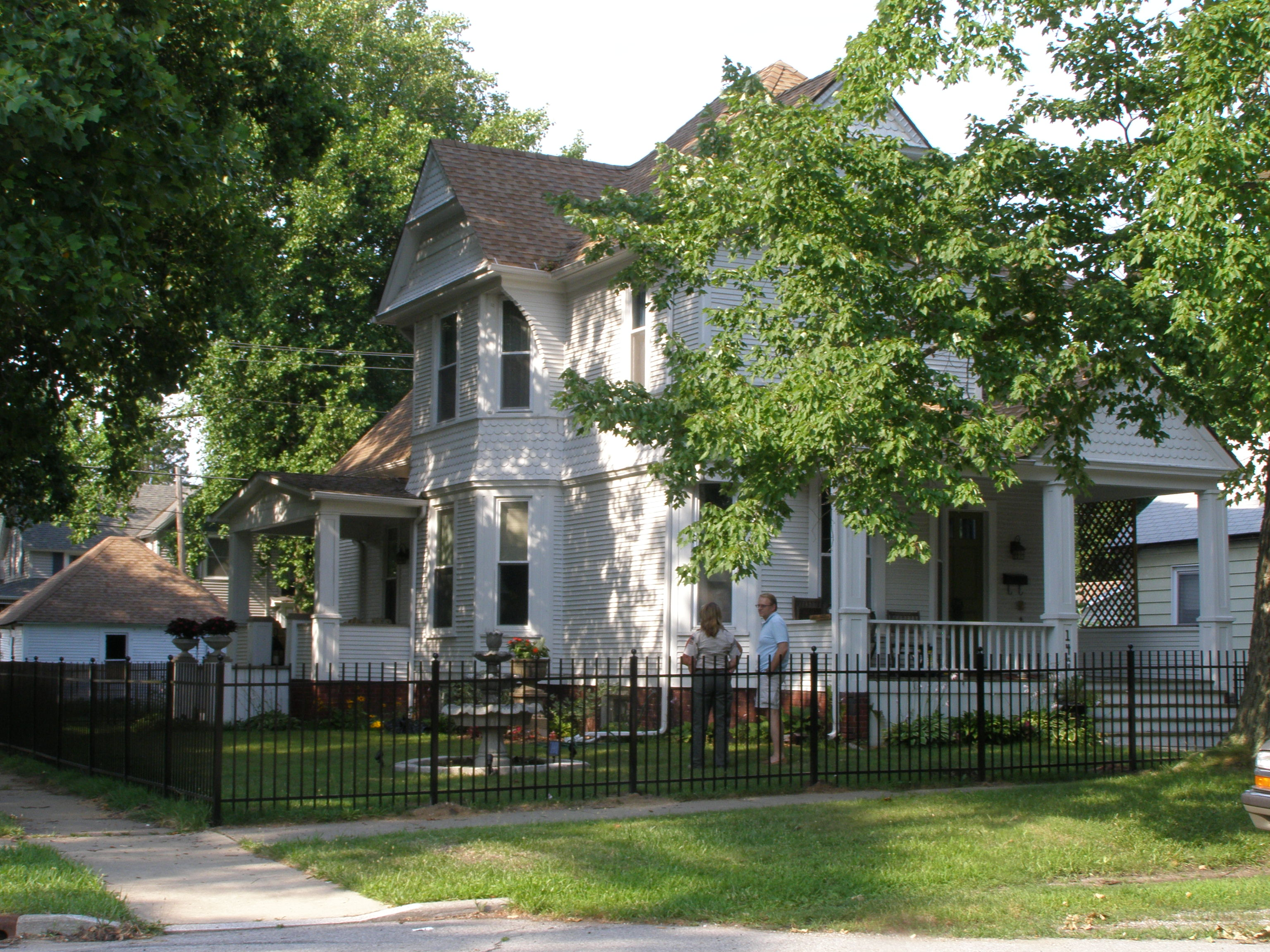
- Queen Anne design, 144 Lincoln Ave.]

- Location within Indiana Location within the United States
- Location: Roughly a two block area between Lincoln & W. Indiana Aves., Chesterton, Indiana
- Coordinates: 41°36′32″N 87°03′13″W
- Area: 4.7 acres (1.9 ha)
- Architect: DeMass, Nathan; Christianson, Henry
- Architectural style: Mid 19th Century Revival, Late Victorian, Colonial Revival, Bungalow
- NRHP reference No.: 09001134
- Added to NRHP: December 24, 2009

Located in Chesterton, Indiana, the Chesterton Residential Historic District is located a block south of the business district, along Second Street from Indiana Ave. to Lincoln Ave. and on Indiana Ave. from Second to Third Streets. The area began with the Martin Young House construction about 1870. The Historic Landmarks Foundation of Indiana describes as one of the best Italianate structures remaining in northwest Indiana. Most of the structures date from the early twentieth century. St. Patrick's Catholic Church, built in 1876, and burned ca. 2000.

The historic district was established in December 2009.

== Key Buildings ==
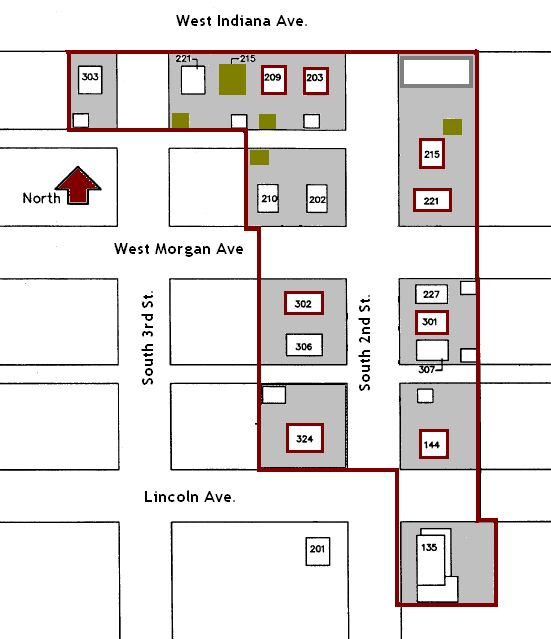
Chesterton Residential Historic District Map. based on map provided in the Nomination to the US Department of the Interior.

- 203 West Indiana Ave. – a free classic architectural style, c. 1905s.
- 209 West Indiana Ave. – a gable front style home.
- 221 Second St. – a colonial revival style c. 1905.
- 301 Second St. – an Italianate style T-plan home, ca. 1880/ 1910.
- 302 West Second St. – a Queen Anne home c. 1895.
- 307 South Second St. – Queen Anne style c. 1868
- 324 Second St. – Martin Young House is a brick Italianate house building the 1870s.
- 144 Lincoln Ave. – a Queen Anne style c. 1900.
- SW corner of Lincoln and Second – Bethlehem Evangelical Lutheran Church, a Gothic Revival c. 1880. Currently used as a meeting hall by the United Methodist church across the street to the north.

== Gallery ==
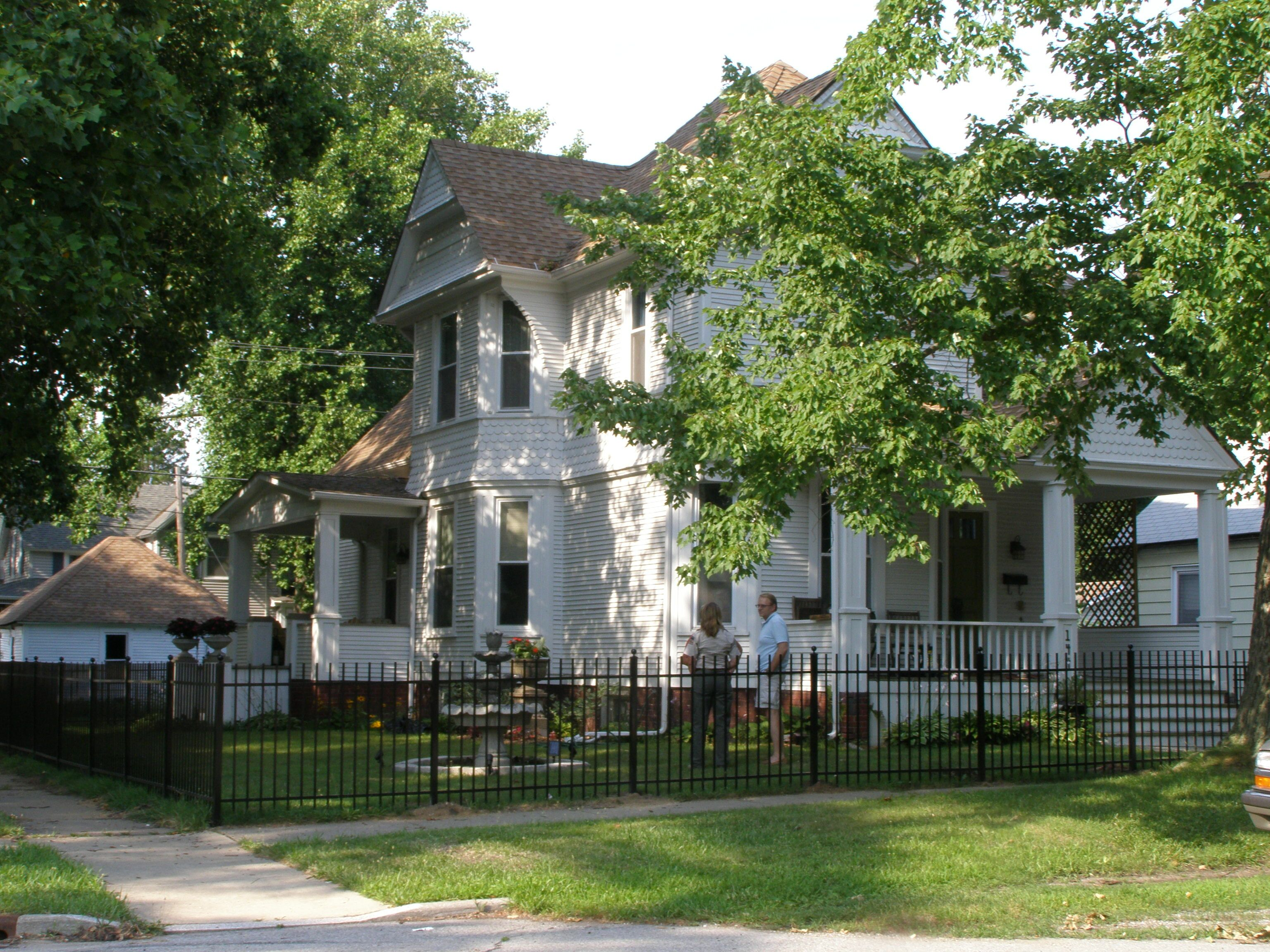
144 Lincoln St

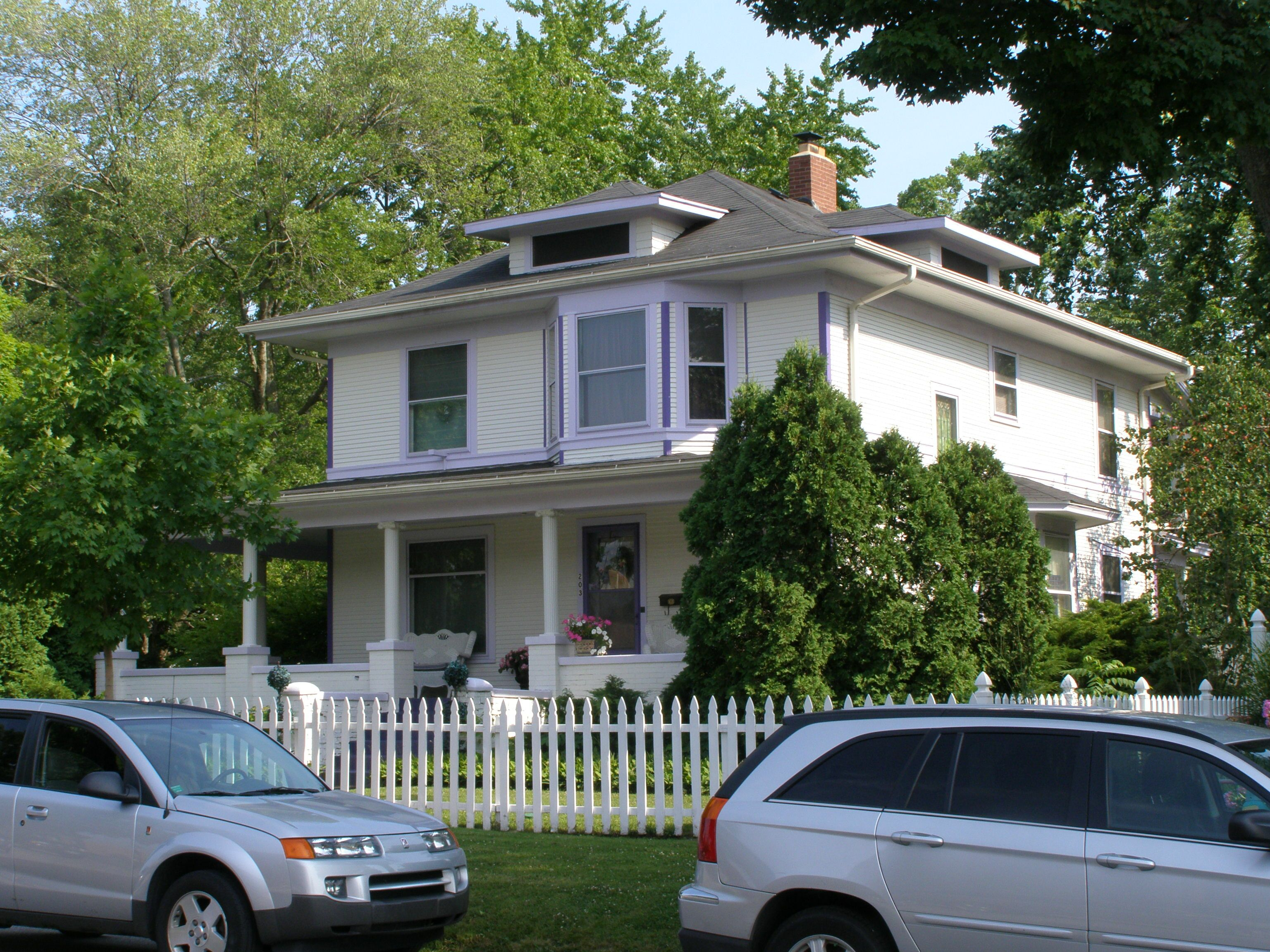
203 Indiana St.

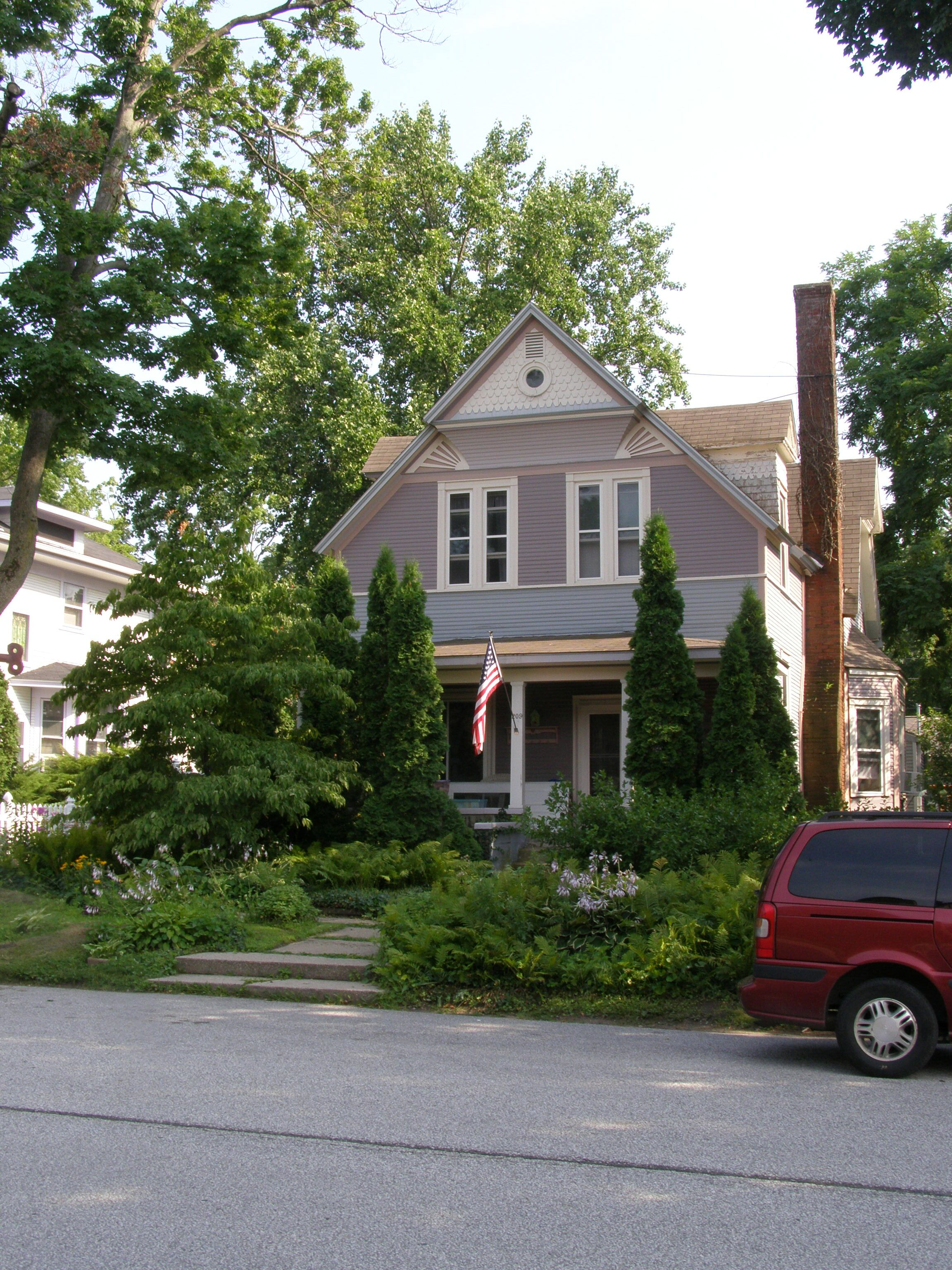
209 Indiana St.

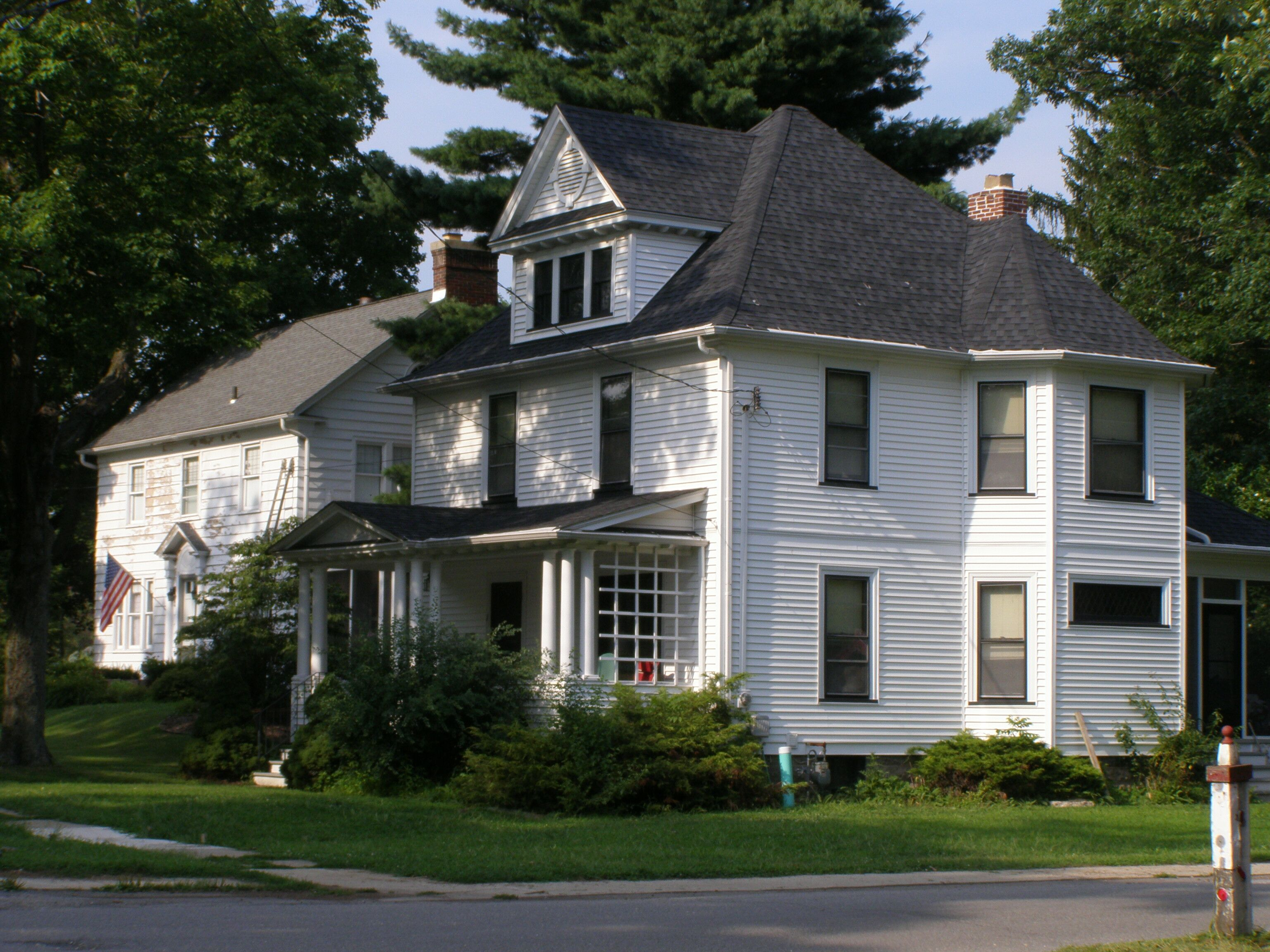
215 Second n 221 Second Sts

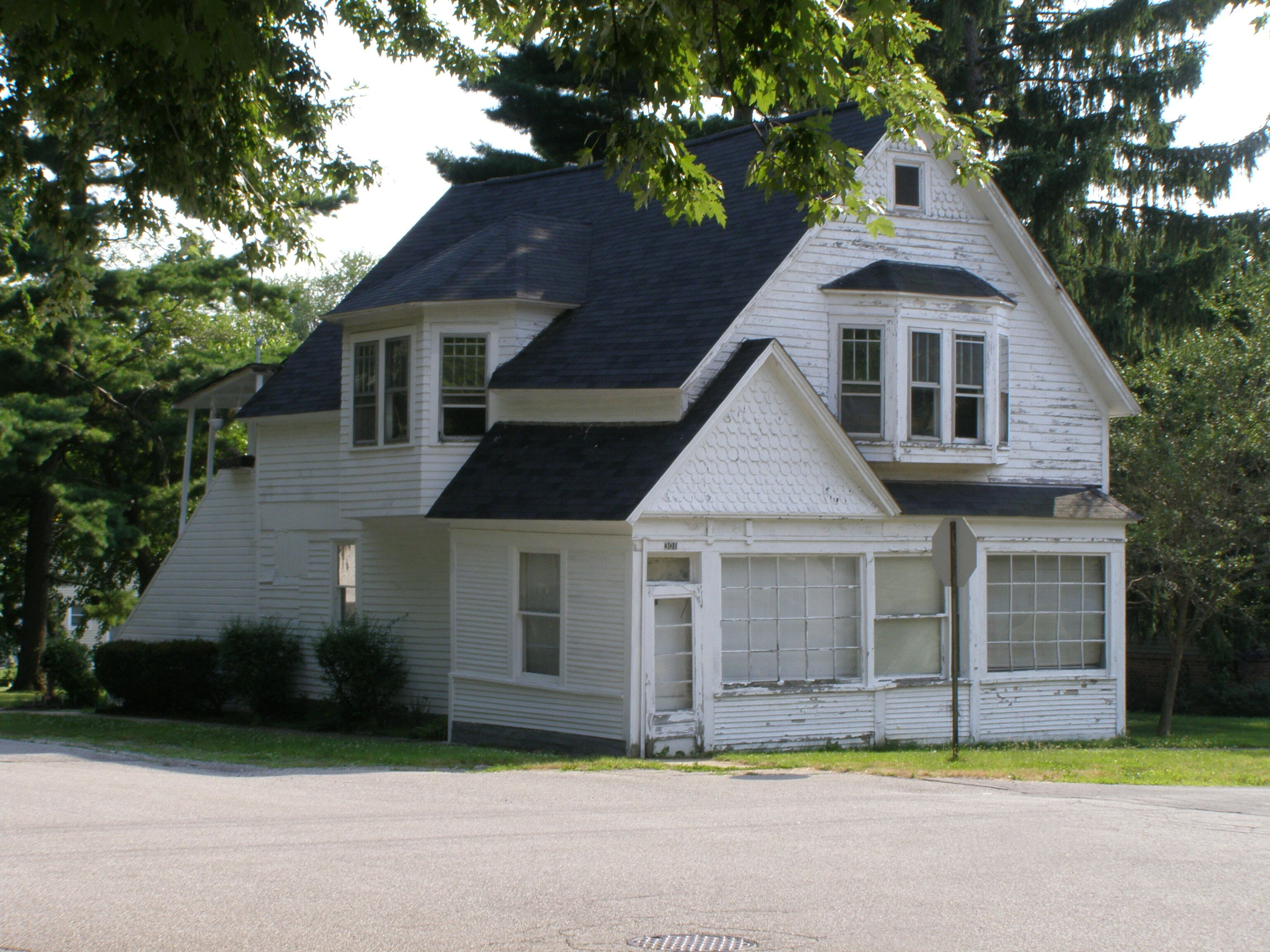
301 Morgan

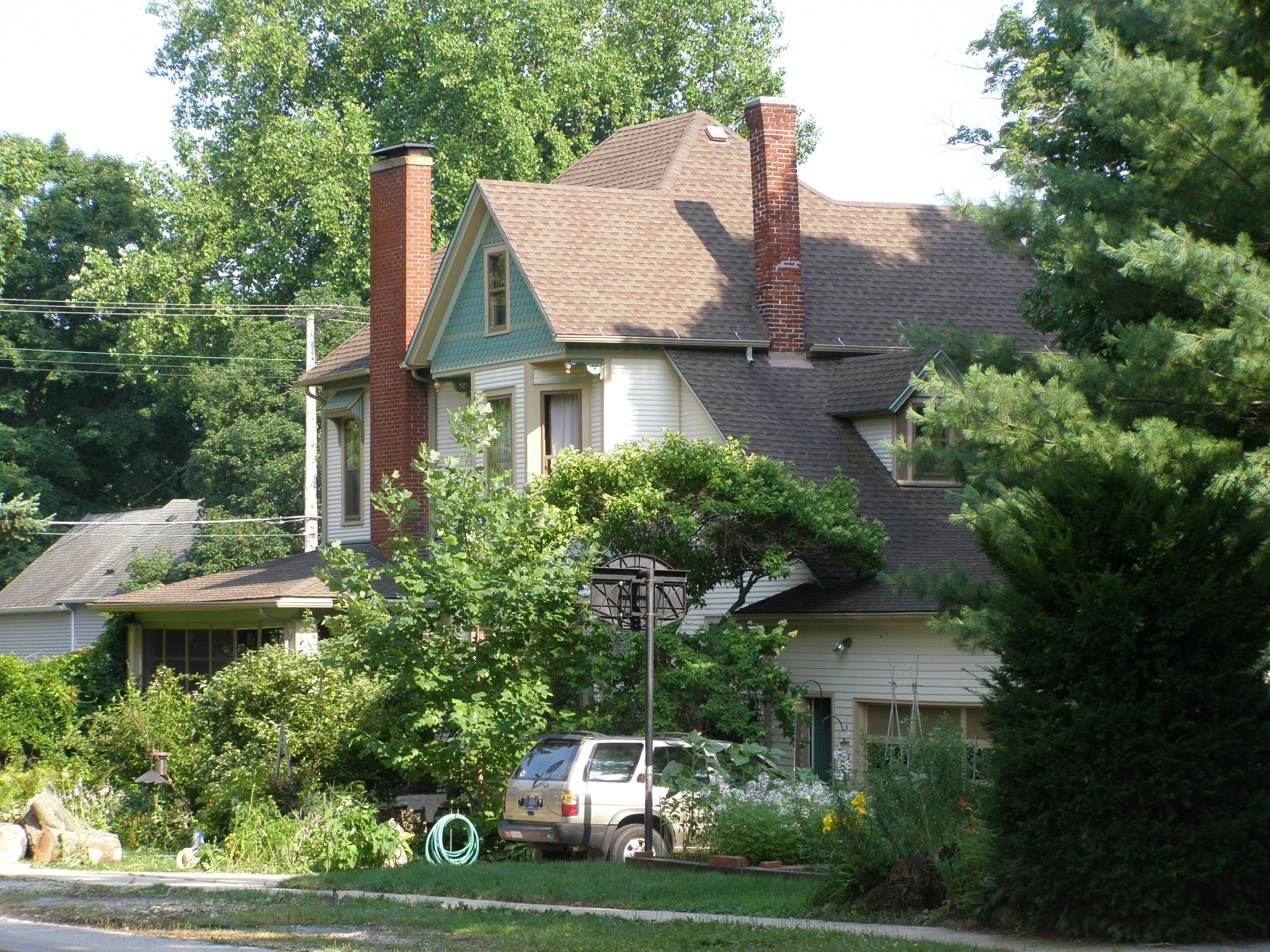
302 Second Street

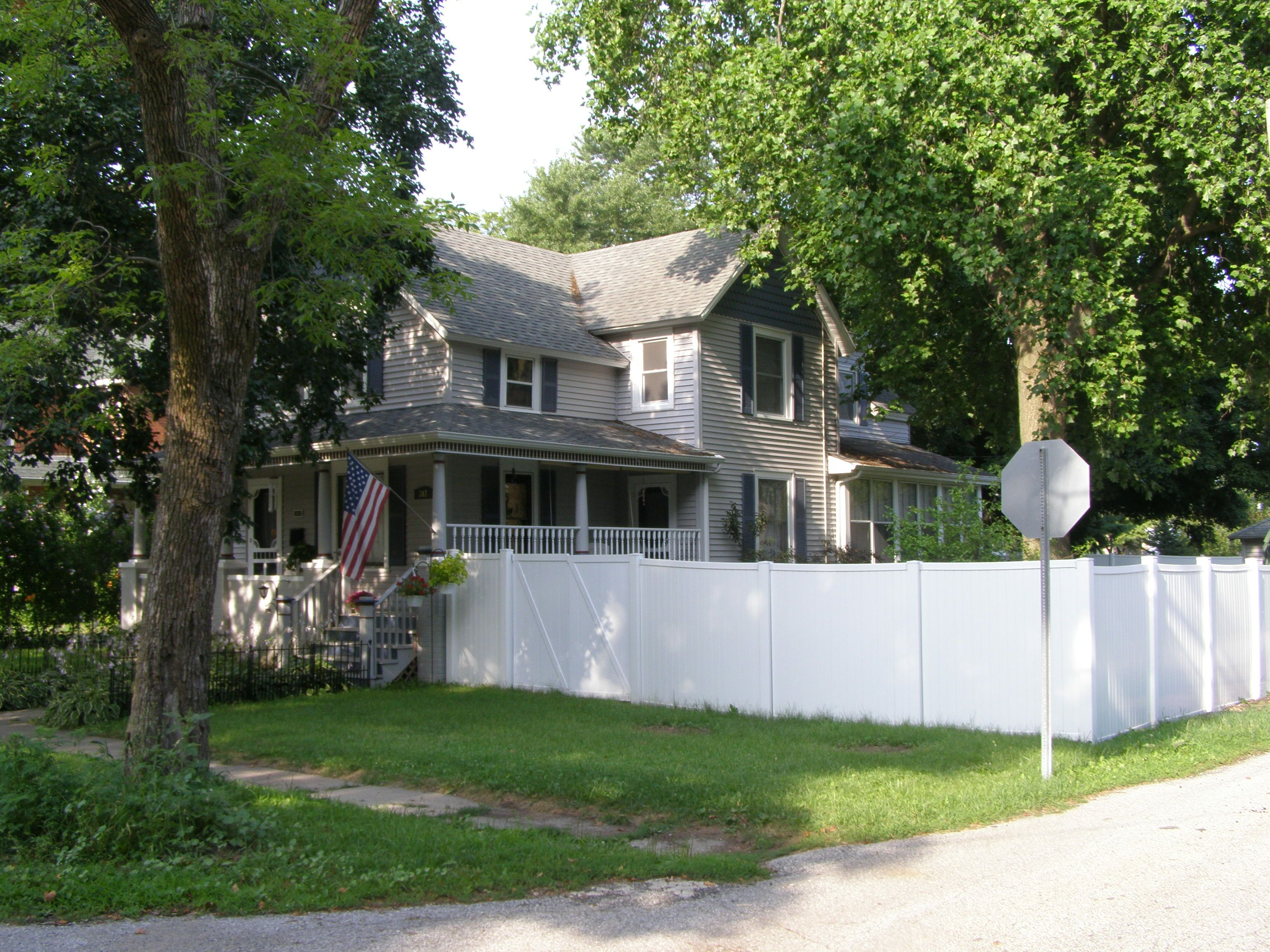
307 Second Street

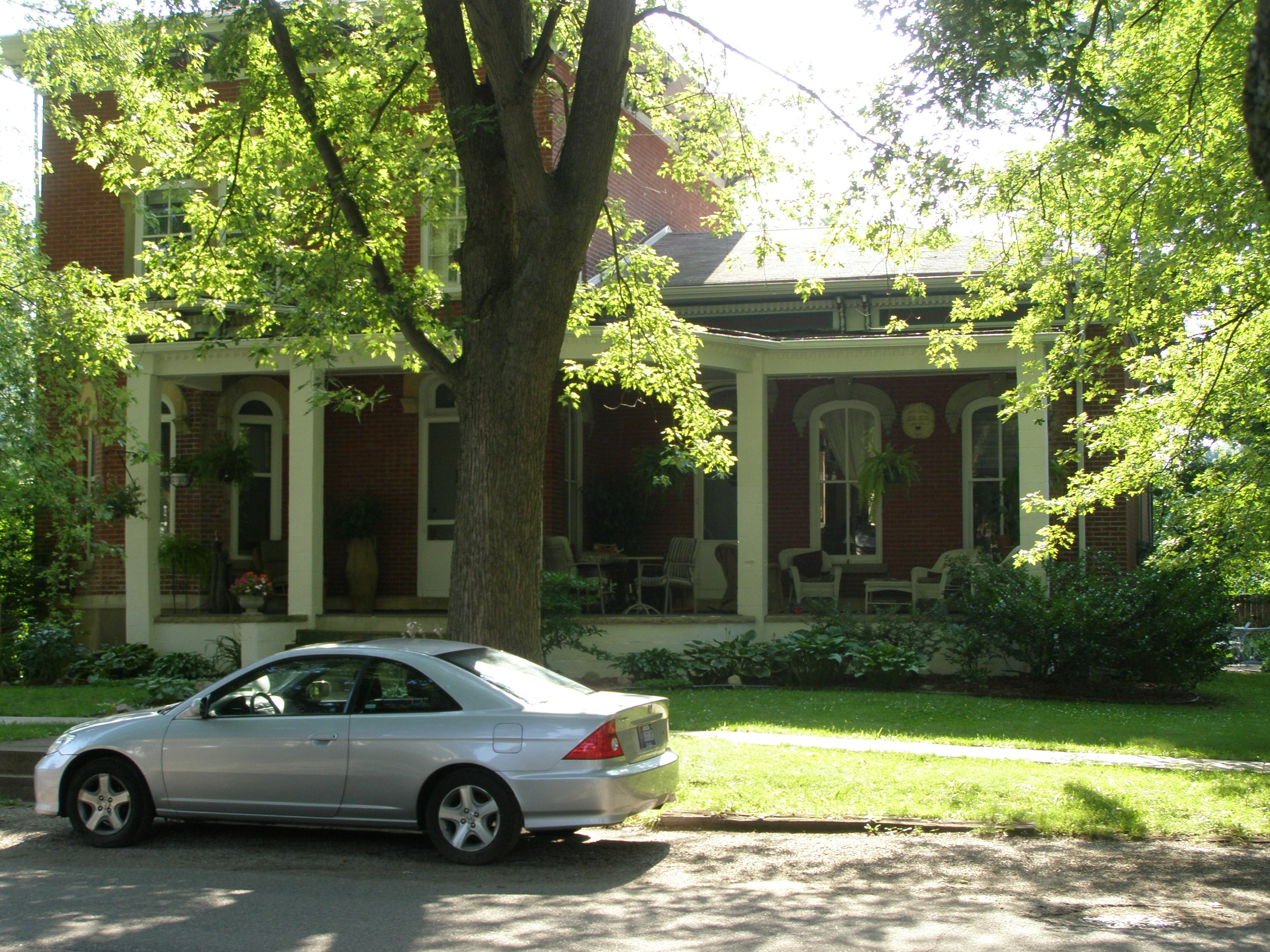
324 Second St., Martin Young Hse

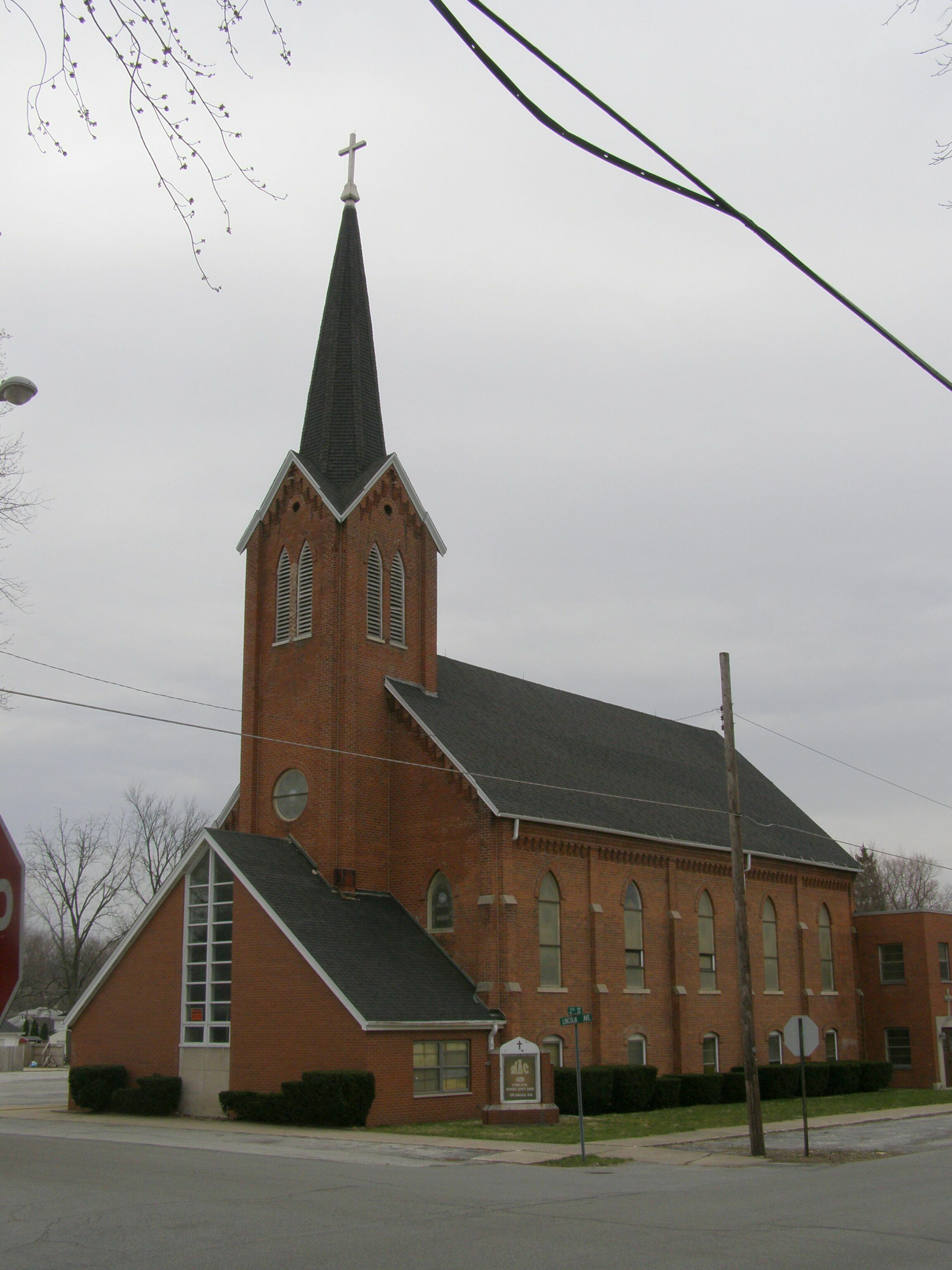
Bethlehem Evan Lutheran Church

== National Register of Historic Sites ==
- Chesterton Commercial Historic District
- Chesterton Residential Historic District
- George Brown Mansion
- Norris and Harriet Coambs Lustron House
- New York Central Railroad Passenger Depot, Chesterton, Indiana
- Martin Young House

== Bibliography ==
- "A Biographical History of Porter County", unpublished manuscript, American Revolution Bicentennial Committee of Porter County, Indiana. Collection of Westchester Public Library, Chesterton, IN, 1976. Includes essays by Terry Dietz and Oral Smith.
- Drury, John. Porter County. Chicago: Inland Photo Co., 1956.
- Weston A. Goodspeed and Charles Blanchard, editors. Counties of Porter and Lake. Indiana. Chicago: F. A. Batty Co., 1882.
- Morgan, George Jr. A Photo Genealogy of the Descendants of G. C. Morgan. Ft. Collins, CO: no publisher, 1993.
- Sanborn Map Company. Insurance Maps of Chesterton. Indiana. 1893, 1899,1905, 1912, 1922,1935.
- Smith, Oral. "My Home Town: A History of Chesterton, Indiana," unpublished manuscript/ notes, collection of Westchester Public Library, Chesterton, IN, 1979.
