= Cicero Hine =

Cicero Hine (23 March 1849 – 6 October 1925) was a British-American architect known for designing Queen Anne style buildings in Chicago.

His best known works include the George Brown Mansion, which is on the U.S. National Register of Historic Places, and a set of iconic cottages that distinguish the Oakland District and Claremont Cottage District in Chicago.

== Biography ==
Hine's family came to Chicago from England in 1869, when he was 20. That same year, he became a draftsman for Gurdon P. Randall, where he helped design the First Baptist Congregational Church. He worked for Randall until 1875, when Hine moved to Ottawa to work for Canada's Government Architect.

Hine returned to Chicago in 1884 and joined the office of Normand Smith Patton before launching an independent practice in 1886. During his independent practice, he designed the George Brown Mansion, the John I. Jones House in Oak Park, and other notable homes in Chicago and Berwyn. In this period, he also worked with the real estate firm Turner & Bond to publish an architectural catalog of "The Claremont Cottage" that was then used as the basis for speculative planned development.

Hine became staff architect for the Brunswick Corporation around 1913. There he designed pool halls, bowling alleys, and furnishings.
