= Oakland District =

Coordinates: 41°49′8″N 87°36′4″W

The Oakland District is a historic district in the Oakland community area of Chicago, Illinois, United States. The district was built between 1872 and 1905 by Cicero Hine and other various architects. It was designated a Chicago Landmark on March 25, 1992.
