= Norris and Harriet Coambs Lustron House =

Historic house in Indiana, United States

- U.S. National Register of Historic Places
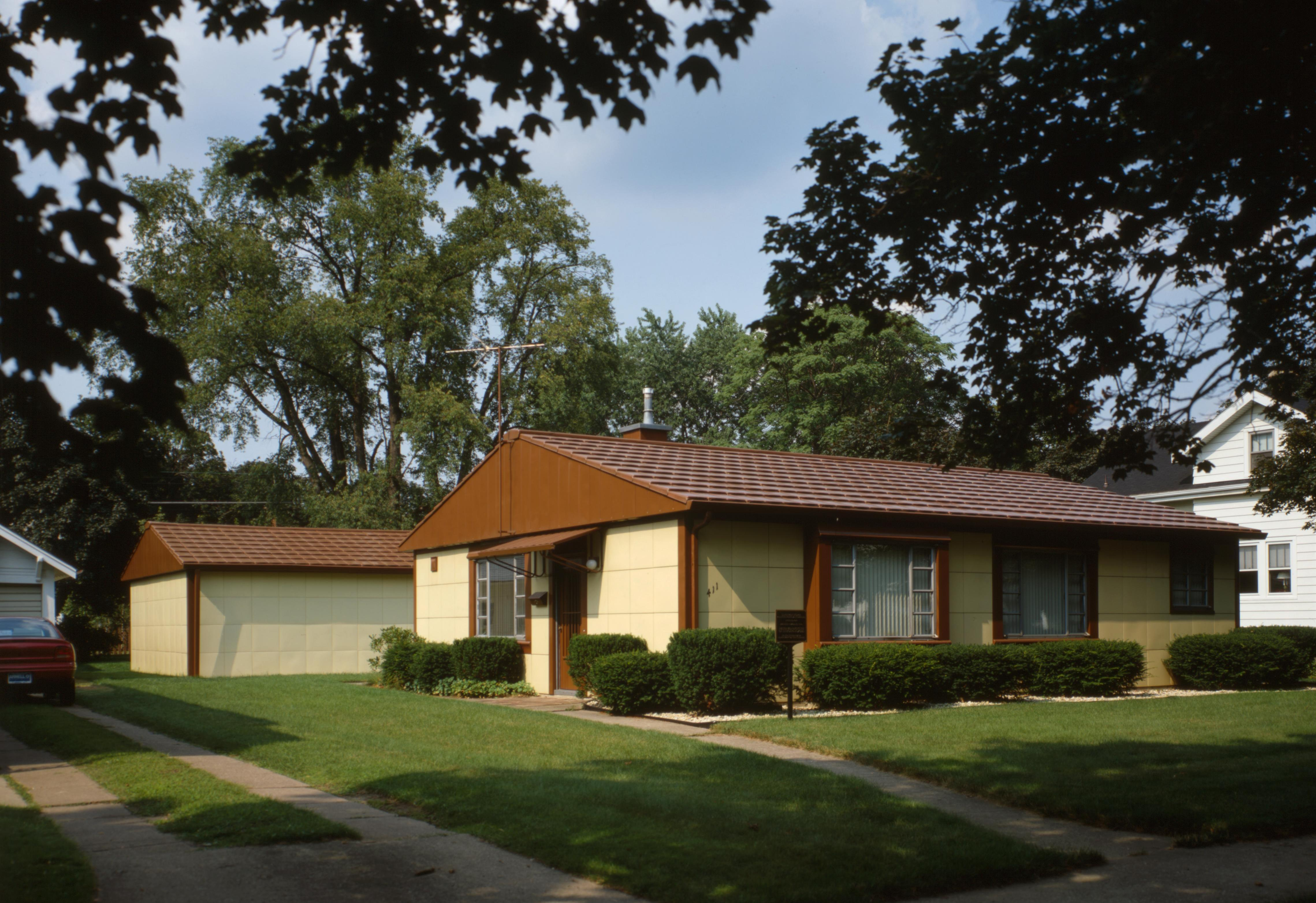
- Built in 1950, the Harriet Coambs Lustron House, located at 411 Bowser Avenue in Chesterton, Indiana,

- Location within Indiana Location within the United States
- Location: 411 Bowser Ave., Chesterton, Indiana
- Coordinates: 41°36′30″N 87°3′19″W
- Area: less than one acre
- Built: 1950
- Architect: Lustron Corp.; Et al.
- Architectural style: Moderne, Lustron;Ranch
- NRHP reference No.: 92001165
- Added to NRHP: September 17, 1992

The Norris and Harriet Coambs Lustron House, also known as the Coambs-Morrow House, is a historic Lustron house located in Chesterton, Indiana. It was built in 1950, this was one of the last manufactured Lustron homes (#2329) of the 2500 sold and produced by the Lustron Corporation. The house has a Lustron two-car detached garage and is located in a pre-World War II subdivision with some homes dating before World War I. The house is a one-story ranch style with no basement. It contains three bedrooms (unlike the majority erected, which have two bedrooms) with living room, dining area, kitchen, utility and bathroom totaling 1,200 square feet (110 m^{2}) of living space.

== Exterior ==
The exterior of the Lustron house and garage are covered with porcelain enameled steel panels, including the shingles, gutters, downspouts, gable ends and exterior wall coverings. The exterior panels are 2 feet (0.61 m) square. The steel exterior doors are likewise finished in the same manner with glass panel inserts. The stationary and casement windows are aluminum framed. The roof overhangs at the front and rear but is nearly flush at the gable ends. The south elevation faces Bowser Avenue. It has two picture window groups, each consisting of four-light casements flanking a fixed picture window. The picture window group to the west is in a slightly projecting bay. To the far right (east) is a pair of small casements. The west elevation has the primary entry sheltered under an aluminum awning. North of this is a picture window grouping. The east elevation has two pairs of symmetrically placed casement windows. The north wall has a picture window group to the far left (east), a single casement, a door, and another pair of casement windows.

== Garage ==
The garage is a simple gable roofed building. On the north are two overhead vehicle doors. The east wall has a door and window.

== Interior ==
The interior of the house has two areas. The north half of the house contains the public areas: living room/dining room, kitchen, and utility room. On the south are three bedrooms. The interior is covered with porcelain enameled steel panels of various sizes and designs. Most interior wall covered by 2 by 8 feet (0.61 by 2.44 m) panels with vertically scored lines. Ceiling panels measure 4 by 4 feet (1.2 by 1.2 m).

Panels in the kitchen, utility room and bathroom are 2 feet (0.61 m) square. The interior enamel color is primarily of "battleship gray." No wood is used in the window trim, door trim or base trim. There are no load-bearing partitions, thus the designs included steel wall furniture and enclosed closet space. Between the dining area and kitchen is a buffet with shelves and drawers on one side and kitchen cabinets with shelves and drawers on the other side. There is a strong art deco influence. The porcelain enameled steel furniture unit between the living room and adjoining bedroom contains a mirrored bookcase on one side and a mirrored vanity and counter top with drawers and doors for closet space on the other side, again, with a sculptured look. All wall corners are rounded—inside and out. This is all part of the "streamlined" look with clean, uncluttered lines and a lack of ornamentation.

== Bibliography ==
- "Big Plans for a Little House," Business Week, p. 44, October 16, 1948.
- Brochures, Camera Tour Through Lustron Home, The Lustron Home, Lustron Garages. Copies in collection of present owner James P. Morrow
- Lustron Newsletter, February 24, 1950, Vol. 3 No. 8.
- Ohio Historical Society, Columbus, Ohio, Collection #MSS861 of Lustron history and documents, including: Advertisements from the 1940s, Agreements, Congressional Record, 1947–1951, Corporate Records, Correspondence, 1946–1971, Dealers, 1949–50, Newspaper, clippings, 1947–1982, Newspaper clippings, 1948–51, Press Releases, 1946–1959, Price Lists, Costs, 1949–1950, Reports, 1947–1953, United States Senate Special Subcommittee on Banking and Currency, 1948, Life Magazine, April 19, 1948, Lustron advertisement, Records from Lustron donated by R. Harold Denton to Ohio Historical Society in Columbus, Ohio, collection #MSS861
- Wolfe, Tom and Garfield, Leonard, "A New Standard for Living: The Lustron House, 1946-50," Perspectives in Vernacular Architecture, 1989, The Curators of University of Missouri Press, Columbia, Missouri.
