= Chester (disambiguation) =

Chester is a city in Cheshire, England.

Chester may also refer to:

== Places ==
=== Canada ===
- Chester, Nova Scotia
- Municipality of the District of Chester, Nova Scotia
- Rural Municipality of Chester No. 125, Saskatchewan

=== United Kingdom ===
- Chester (non-metropolitan district), an administrative area of Cheshire (1974–2009)
- County Borough of Chester, a district of Cheshire abolished in 1974
- Chester-le-Street, County Durham

=== United States ===
- Chester, Arkansas
- Chester, California, in Plumas County
- Chester, Connecticut
- Chester, Georgia
- Chester, Idaho
- Chester, Illinois
- Chester, Indiana
- Chester, Iowa
- Chester, Maine
- Chester, Maryland
- Chester, Massachusetts, a town
  - Chester (CDP), Massachusetts, the main village in the town
- Chester, Minnesota
- Chester, Mississippi
- Chester, Montana
- Chester, Nebraska
- Chester, New Hampshire
- Chester, Orange County, New York
  - Chester (village), New York
- Chester, Warren County, New York
- Chester, Ohio
- Chester, Oklahoma
- Chester, Pennsylvania
- Chester, South Carolina
- Chester, South Dakota
- Chester, Texas
- Chester, Vermont
- Chester (CDP), Vermont
- Chester, Virginia
- Chester, West Virginia
- Chester, Wisconsin
- Chester Borough, New Jersey
- Chester River, a tributary of Chesapeake Bay

== People and fictional characters ==
- Chester (given name), including lists of people and fictional characters
- Chester (surname), a list of people

== Animals ==
- Chester (horse) (1874–1888), Australian racehorse and sire
- Chester White, a breed of domestic pig from Pennsylvania

== Arts and entertainment ==
- Chester (band), a Canadian bubblegum pop band, active primarily from 1972 to 1975
- Chester (album), by Josh Rouse
- "Chester" (song), an American Revolutionary War anthem composed by William Billings

== Ships ==
- HMS Chester, various Royal Navy ships
- Chester-class cruiser, a United States Navy class
  - USS Chester (CL-1), a light cruiser in service from 1908 to 1921
- USS Chester (CA-27), a heavy cruiser commissioned in 1930
- SS Chester, a passenger and cargo vessel built in 1884

== Other uses ==
- Chester F.C., a football club based in Chester, England
- Chester (TTC), a subway station in Toronto, Canada
- ChesterBus, a bus operator in Cheshire, England
- Chester (placename element)
- Chester (Homeville, Virginia), a house on the National Register of Historic Places
- Earl of Chester, another title of the Prince of Wales
- City of Chester (UK Parliament constituency) a constituency of the UK Parliament
- Chester Cheetah, the mascot for the snack food Cheetos

== See also ==
- Chester's, American chicken restaurant
- Chesters (disambiguation)
- Chester City (disambiguation)
- Chester County (disambiguation)
- Chester Creek, a tributary of the Delaware River
- Chesterfield (disambiguation)
- Chester Heights, Pennsylvania
- Chester Hill, Pennsylvania
- Chester Springs, Pennsylvania
- Chesterton (disambiguation)
- Chestertown (disambiguation)
- Chester Township (disambiguation)
- Chesterville (disambiguation)
- West Chester (disambiguation)
