= USS Salem (CL-3) =

Chester-class cruiser

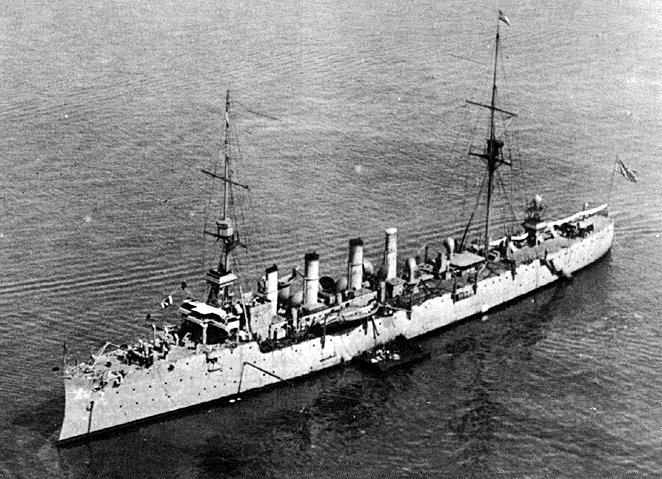
- USS Salem (CS-3), undated

History

United States
- Name: Salem
- Namesake: City of Salem, Massachusetts
- Ordered: 27 April 1904
- Awarded: 17 May 1905
- Builder: Fore River Shipyard, Quincy Point, Quincy, Massachusetts
- Cost: $1,566,000 (hull & machinery)
- Laid down: 28 August 1905
- Launched: 27 July 1907
- Sponsored by: Mrs. Lorna Pinnock
- Commissioned: 1 August 1908
- Decommissioned: 16 August 1921
- Reclassified: CL-3, 17 July 1920
- Stricken: 13 November 1929
- Identification: Hull symbol: CS-3; Hull symbol: CL-3
- Fate: Sold for scrap, 11 February 1930

General characteristics (As built)
- Class & type: Chester-class Scout cruiser
- Displacement: 3,750 long tons (3,810 t) (standard); 4,687 long tons (4,762 t) (full load)
- Length: 423 ft 1 in (128.96 m) oa; 420 ft (130 m) pp
- Beam: 47 ft 1 in (14.35 m)
- Draft: 16 ft 9 in (5.11 m) (mean)
- Installed power: 12 × Fore River boilers; 19,578 ihp (14,599 kW)(produced on trials)
- Propulsion: 2 × Curtis steam turbines; 2 × screws
- Speed: 24 knots (44 km/h; 28 mph); 25.95 knots (48.06 km/h; 29.86 mph) (Speed on Trial)
- Complement: 42 officers 326 enlisted
- Armament: 2 × 5 in (130 mm)/50 caliber Mark 6 breech-loading rifles; 6 × 3 in (76 mm)/50 caliber rapid-fire guns (6x1); 2 × 3-pounder (47 mm (1.9 in)) Driggs-Schroeder saluting guns; 2 × 21 inch (533 mm) torpedo tubes
- Armor: Belt: 2 in (5.1 cm); Deck: 1 in (25 mm) (over steering gear)

General characteristics (1917)
- Propulsion: 2 × General Electric steam turbines
- Armament: 4 × 5 in (130 mm)/51 caliber guns; 2 × 3 in (76 mm)/50 caliber rapid-fire guns; 1 × 3 in (76 mm)/50 caliber anti-aircraft gun; 2 × 3-pounder (47 mm (1.9 in) saluting guns; 2 × 21 in (533 mm) torpedo tubes

USS Salem (CS-3/CL-3), Scout Cruiser No. 3, was a Chester-class scout cruiser of the United States Navy. She was the first Navy ship named for the city of Salem, Massachusetts.

Salem was laid down on 28 August 1905, by the Fore River Shipyard; launched on 27 July 1907, sponsored by Mrs. Lorna Pinnock; and commissioned on 1 August 1908.

== Pre-World War I ==
As one of the Navy's first turbine-engined warships, Salem departed Boston on 17 October 1908 to carry out extensive trials along the Atlantic coast. Joining her sister ships, Birmingham and Chester, in the Scout Cruiser Division in June 1909, Salem cruised in the Atlantic, making one voyage to Funchal, Madeira. Assigned to the 5th Division, Atlantic Fleet, in, 1910, Salem briefly deployed to Haitian waters during August 1911, returning to the New York Navy Yard on 11 September. In April 1912, Salem was dispatched to escort the liner RMS Carpathia which was returning to New York City with the survivors of the Titanic disaster. Subsequently placed in reserve at the Boston Navy Yard on 20 April 1912, Salem relieved Wabash as receiving ship there on that date and served until 7 October. Then reassigned to the Reserve Force, Atlantic Fleet, Salem subsequently made a cruise to Gibraltar and returned to the United States in late March 1913. Arriving at Hampton Roads on 25 March, she shifted to Philadelphia on 30 March.

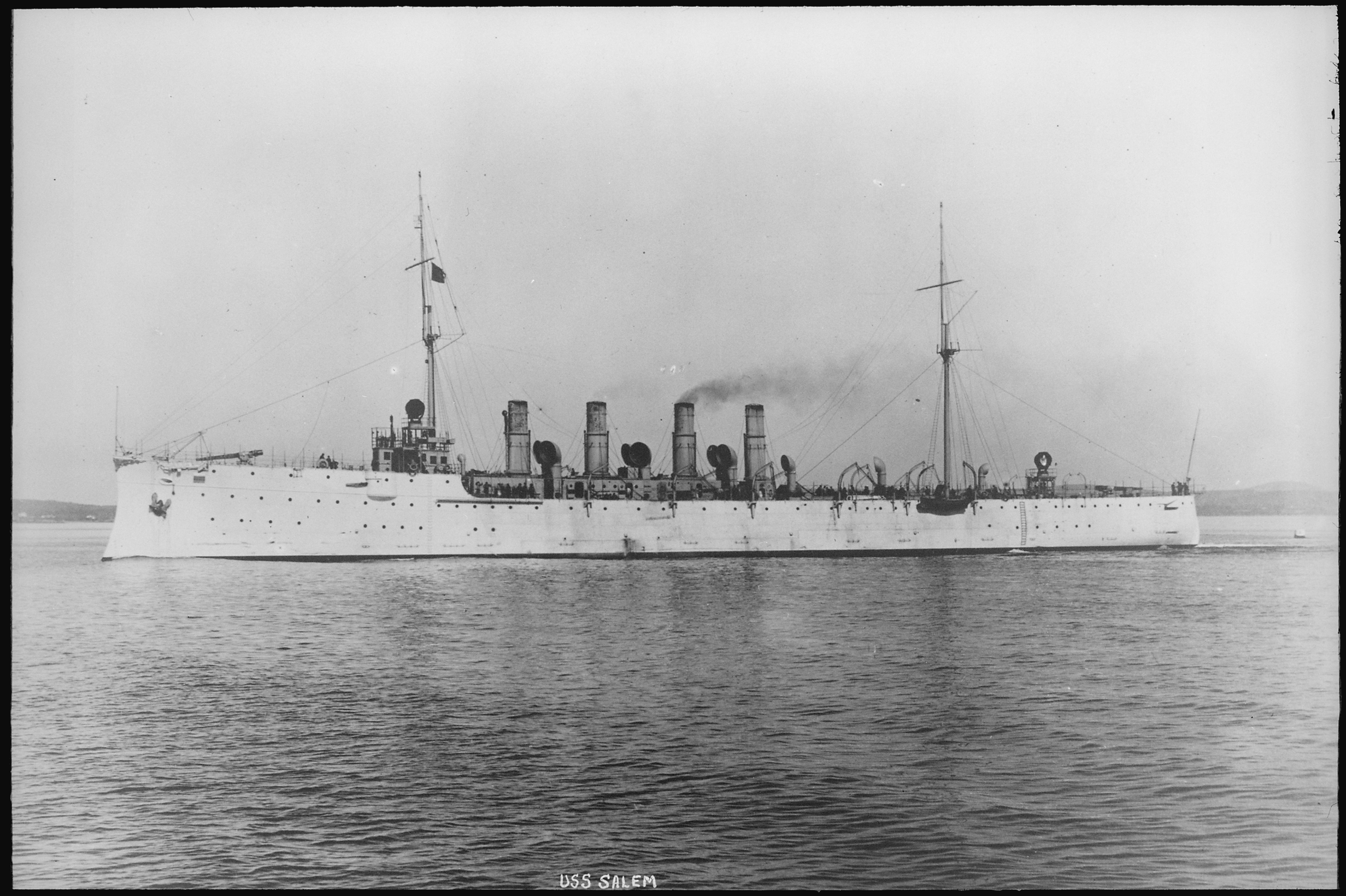
Salem in 1908

Salem remained at Philadelphia, in reduced commission, into 1914. On 23 April, Salem was placed in full commission and assigned to the Special Service Squadron for duty in Mexican waters. She cruised off the Mexican port of Veracruz supporting US operations ashore until assigned to the Cruiser Squadron, Atlantic Fleet, on 2 September. Departing Veracruz on 19 September, Salem arrived at Boston on 1 October for service with the Atlantic Fleet but was detached from the Cruiser Squadron on 25 November, and was again placed in reserve on 1 December. She relieved Brooklyn as a receiving ship at the Boston Navy Yard on 12 March 1915 and served there until assigned to the Caribbean on 21 May 1916. Cruising off Mexican and Dominican ports, Salem transported Marine detachments, assisted in radio communication links, and protected United States interests until returning to the Philadelphia Navy Yard to be placed out of commission on 2 December 1916.

== World War I ==
Following US entry into World War I, Salem was recommissioned on 21 April 1917 for duty as a receiving ship at the Philadelphia Navy Yard. Two days later, however, she was decommissioned and towed to the Boston Navy Yard to have her original Curtis turbines replaced by General Electric turbines.

Recommissioned on 25 July, while still undergoing overhaul, Salem stood out of Boston harbor on 12 March 1918 for New London, Connecticut, to join a force gathering to convoy submarine chasers across the Atlantic. On 21 March 1918 she damaged the Barge "William C. Moore" in a collision, the Barge later sank at dock in New London, Connecticut. From 31 March-15 June, she served as flagship for two convoys of submarine chasers, leaving both at Ponta Delgada, Azores, and returning westward. On 18 June, she became a flagship of a flotilla of 12 submarine chasers assigned to Key West to operate against German submarines. Arriving at Key West on the 22nd, Salem's force carried out antisubmarine patrols off Florida and as far south as the Yucatán Peninsula through the remainder of World War I.

On 27 November, the force was disbanded; and, after an overhaul at the Boston Navy Yard, Salem steamed to the west coast. Designated CL-3 on 17 July 1920, she was decommissioned at Mare Island on 16 August 1921; struck from the Naval Vessel Register on 13 November 1929; and, with cruisers Albany and New Orleans, sold on 11 February 1930 to D. G. Seagraves of San Francisco, California, for scrapping.
