= List of shipwrecks in April 1886 =

The list of shipwrecks in April 1886 includes ships sunk, foundered, grounded, or otherwise lost during April 1886.

== 3 April ==
List of shipwrecks: 3 April 1886
Ship	State	Description
Pietro	Italy	The barque caught fire and burned to the water-line in the Penarth Roads, Glamorgan, United Kingdom. She was on a voyage from Penarth to São Paulo de Loanda, Portuguese West Africa.
Santiago	United Kingdom	The barque ran aground three times in the River Foyle. She was refloated and towed in to Londonderry.

== 5 April ==
List of shipwrecks: 5 April 1886
Ship	State	Description
Alvega	Germany	The barque was run into by another vessel off the coast of New Jersey, United States and was severely damaged. She was on a voyage from Amsterdam, North Holland, Netherlands to Philadelphia, Pennsylvania, United States. She was towed in to the Delaware Breakwater by the tug Ocean King (United States).

== 6 April ==
For the sinking of Oconto on this date, see the entry for 5 December 1885.

List of shipwrecks: 6 April 1886
Ship	State	Description
Mountain Boy	United States	The sternwheeler capsized at Owensborough, Kentucky with the loss of three of her crew. She was a total loss.

== 7 April ==
List of shipwrecks: 7 April 1886
Ship	State	Description
Railway	United Kingdom	The ketch heeled over and filled with water at Cardiff, Glamorgan. Her crew were rescued. She was on a voyage from Cardiff to Bridgwater, Somerset.
Star of Hope	United States	The steam barge was wrecked when the tow line to the tug Burlington (United States) parted in heavy weather and she was driven ashore at Point Pelee, Ontario, Canada. Her crew were rescued by Canadian fishermen. She was refloated and taken to Detroit, Michigan, but was a total loss.
William Vanatta	United States	The schooner barge, (a.k.a. Vannatta, Vennette, or Vennetta), was wrecked when the tow line to the tug Burlington (United States) parted in heavy weather and was driven ashore at Point Pelee. Her crew were rescued by Canadian fishermen. She was a total loss.

== 8 April ==
List of shipwrecks: 8 April 1886
Ship	State	Description
Alvab	United Kingdom	The steamship ran aground in the Suez Canal.
Ellangowan	United Kingdom	The ship was driven ashore at Helensburgh, Dunbartonshire. She caught fire and was a total loss.

== 9 April ==
List of shipwrecks: 9 April 1886
Ship	State	Description
Islay	United Kingdom	The schooner ran aground on Pladdalug, in the Strangford Lough. She was on a voyage form Larne, County Antrim to Killyleagh, County Down.

== 11 April ==
List of shipwrecks: 11 April 1886
Ship	State	Description
Star	(Dominion of Newfoundland) Newfoundland Colony	The brig foundered in the Atlantic Ocean with the loss of four of her eight crew. Survivors were rescued by the barque Florence ( Canada).
Taiaroa	United Kingdom	Taiaroa The schooner-rigged coaster, a steamship, was wrecked on the coast of New Zealand's South Island near the mouth of the Clarence River with the loss of 36 of the 50 people on board. She was on a voyage from Wellington to Lyttelton.

== 12 April ==
List of shipwrecks: 12 April 1886
Ship	State	Description
Colstrup	United Kingdom	The steamship was driven ashore at Honfleur, Manche and was severely damaged. She was on a voyage from Cardiff, Glamorgan to Honfleur. She was refloated and taken in to Honfleur.
St Athens	United Kingdom	The schooner sprang a leak and foundered off the Longships, Cornwall. Her seven crew were rescued. She was on a voyage from Runcorn, Cheshire to Plymouth, Devon. It was strongly suspected that her mate had bored holes in her hull with an auger.

== 13 April ==
List of shipwrecks: 13 April 1886
Ship	State	Description
A. M. Schweigaard	Flag unknown	The ship was wrecked on Watling Island, Bermuda. She was on a voyage from St. Jago de Cuba, Cuba to New York, United States.
Lambeth	United Kingdom	The steamship collided with the steamship Vesta (Germany) in the River Thames at Blackwall, Middlesex and was beached.
William Harkness	United Kingdom	The steamship was holed by her anchor at Bilbao, Spain.

== 14 April ==
List of shipwrecks: 14 April 1886
Ship	State	Description
Rembrandt	Netherlands	The steamship ran aground at Ven, Sweden. She was on a voyage from Rotterdam, South Holland to Copenhagen, Denmark. She was refloated with assistance from a steamship and taken in to Copenhagen.

== 15 April ==
List of shipwrecks: 15 April 1886
Ship	State	Description
Africa	United States	The steamship was destroyed by fire in Owen Sound, Ontario, Canada.

== 16 April ==
List of shipwrecks: 16 April 1886
Ship	State	Description
Charles Connell	United Kingdom	The ship was sighted whilst on a voyage from Rangoon, Burma to the English Channel. No further trace, reported missing.
Nifa	Denmark	The steamship ran aground at South Shields, County Durham, United Kingdom. She was on a voyage from South Shields to Aarhus.
Prince Alfred	United Kingdom	The fishing trawler struck the Bowden Rocks, off the coast of Kincardineshire and sank with the loss of five of her nine crew.

== 17 April ==
List of shipwrecks: 17 April 1886
Ship	State	Description
Prince Alfred	United Kingdom	The steam trawler struck a reef about 1 nautical mile (1.9 km) south of Stonehaven, Aberdeenshire and sank with the loss of five of her eight crew.

== 18 April ==
List of shipwrecks: 18 April 1886
Ship	State	Description
Governor	United Kingdom	The Thames barge collided with the steamship Rambler (United Kingdom) and sank in the River Thames at Wapping, Middlesex.
Lena	United Kingdom	The sloop capsized in the River Thames at Shadwell, Middlesex.
Valuta	Germany	The steamship collided with the steamship Petropolis (Germany) and sank in the English Channel 15 nautical miles (28 km) north east of the Goodwin Sands, Kent, United Kingdom. All 22 people on board were rescued by Petropolis. Valuta was on a voyage from Hamburg to the Amoor.

== 19 April ==
List of shipwrecks: 19 April 1886
Ship	State	Description
Langdale	United Kingdom	The steamship was driven ashore and wrecked at Roker, County Durham. Her sixteen crew were rescued by the Sunderland Lifeboat. She was on a voyage from London to Sunderland, County Durham.

== 20 April ==
List of shipwrecks: 20 April 1886
Ship	State	Description
Cuxhaven	United Kingdom	The steamship collided with the steamship Progress (United Kingdom) in the River Ouse near Goole, Yorkshire and was beached. Cuxhaven was on a voyage from Goole to Hamburg, Germany. She was salvaged in May, repaired and returned to service.
Doris	Norway	The brig was driven ashore at Hunstanton, Norfolk, United Kingdom. She was on a voyage from Kragerø to Ramsgate, Kent, United Kingdom.

== 21 April ==
List of shipwrecks: 21 April 1886
Ship	State	Description
Isabel	United Kingdom	The ship departed from Runcorn, Cheshire for the Ísafjarðardjúp. No further trace, reported missing.
Mary Spencer	United Kingdom	The barque was destroyed by fire in the Atlantic Ocean (46°30′N 13°00′W). Her eleven crew were rescued by the barque Maria Antoinette (Germany). Mary Spencer was on a voyage from Aquilas, Spain to Tayport, Fife.

== 23 April ==
List of shipwrecks: 23 April 1886
Ship	State	Description
Eureka	United States	The schooner struck a ledge and sunk off the Delaware Breakwater. Her crew were rescued.
Kepler	Germany	The steamship was wrecked on Ouessant, Finistère, France. She was on a voyage from Lisbon, Portugal to a Dutch port.
Unnamed	Flag unknown	The steamship was wrecked on Ouessant.

== 24 April ==
List of shipwrecks: 24 April 1886
Ship	State	Description
Norham	United Kingdom	The steamship was wrecked off Ouessant, Finistère, France. Her crew were rescued. She was on a voyage from Bilbao, Spain to Rotterdam, South Holland, Netherlands.
St. George	United Kingdom	The dandy sank at Whitehead, County Antrim. Her crew were rescued. She was on a voyage from Belfast, County Antrim to Laghall, Dumfriess-shire.

== 28 April ==
List of shipwrecks: 28 April 1886
Ship	State	Description
Mildred	United Kingdom	The schooner was run into by the steamship Eldorado and sank in the English Channel between the Isle of Portland, Dorset and the Isle of Wight with the loss of a crew member. Survivors were rescued by Eldorado. Mildred was on a voyage from Runcorn, Cheshire to London.

== 30 April ==
List of shipwrecks: 30 April 1886
Ship	State	Description
Wynnstay	United Kingdom	The steamship ran aground at Brăila, Romania. She was on a voyage from Brăila to Antwerp, Belgium. She was later refloated.
xxxx	United Kingdom	The ship .

== Unknown date ==
List of shipwrecks: Unknown date in April 1886
Ship	State	Description
Admiral	United Kingdom	The full-rigged ship sank in the Pentland Firth with the loss of all hands, according to a message in a bottle that washed up in Sinclair Bay.
Alexander Keith	United States	The barque was driven ashore on the Marquesas Keys, Florida. She was on a voyage from Pensacola, Florida to Buenos Aires, Argentina. She was later refloated and towed in to Key West, Florida by Thomas A. Cochrane (United States).
Alphée	France	The steamship caught fire and was run ashore at "Cherme", Greece. She was on a voyage from Smyrna, Ottoman Empire to Marseille, Bouches-du-Rhône.
Brizo	United Kingdom	The ship was wrecked at "Samphire". She was on a voyage from New York to Eleuthera, Bahamas.
Caridad, and Vargas	Spain	The steamships collided at Cartagena and were both severely damaged. Vargas was beached and became a wreck.
Charm	United Kingdom	The ketch ran aground and sank at Sunderland, County Durham. Her crew were rescued.
Cheliff	France	The steamship was driven ashore and wrecked at Palamós, Spain. Her crew were rescued.
Coq du Village	France	The ship collided with François (France) and sank at Bordeaux, Gironde.
Dagmar	United Kingdom	The brig sank at Cardiff, Glamorgan. She was on a voyage from Cardiff to Gravesend, Kent. She was later refloated.
Ellie Knight	United States	The ship was driven ashore on the coast of Honduras. She was a total loss.
Erikka	Flag unknown	The ship was wrecked at "Inhamissingo", Africa.
Eros	United Kingdom	The steamship was driven ashore 7 nautical miles (13 km) south of Barnegat, New Jersey, United States. Her crew were rescued. She was on a voyage from Swansea, Glamorga to Philadelphia, Pennsylvania, United States.
Ettjes	Germany	The schooner was abandoned in the North Sea. Her crew were rescued by the schooner Ida (Netherlands). Ettjes was on a voyage from Bremen to Gothenburg, Sweden.
Franziska	Norway	The barque ran aground on the Haisborough Sands, in the North Sea off the coast of Norfolk, United Kingdom and was abandoned by her crew. She was on a voyage from Langesund to Liverpool, Lancashire, United Kingdom.
Fred Gray	United States	The schooner was wrecked in the Cayman Islands. She was on a voyage from "Lucca" to the Spanish Main.
Friends	United Kingdom	The sloop sank at Skitter Point. Her crew were rescued.
Gerda	United Kingdom	The ship struck a sunken wreck and was beached at Kirkwall, Orkney Islands. She was on a voyage from South Shields, County Durham to Valparaíso, Chile. She was later refloated.
Honduras	United Kingdom	The steamship was wrecked in South American waters. All on board were rescued. She was on a voyage from Champerico, Guatemala to Panama City, United States of Colombia.
Isabella Stuart	United Kingdom	The schooner was driven ashore at Dundrum, County Down.
Louise and Georgine	Flag unknown	The ship was wrecked at Sulina, Romania.
Jane	United Kingdom	The schooner was run down and sunk off the coast of Cornwall between 14 and 25 April with the loss of all hands. She was on a voyage from Llanelly, Glamorgan to Saint-Vaast-la-Hougue, Manche, France.
Juno	United Kingdom	The Thames barge was run into by the steamship Vane Tempest (United Kingdom and sank in the River Thames at the Tower of London.
Leteitia	Flag unknown	The steamship struck the pier at New York and was severely damaged.
Lotus	(Ottoman Empire) Egypt	The armed sternwheeler was wrecked on the Dal Cataract, in the Nile.
Maria Simone	Italy	The barque was driven ashore and wrecked at "Winter Quarter", Pennsylvania, United States.
Martha Birnie	United Kingdom	The barque was driven ashore on Gotland, Sweden. She was later refloated and taken in to Burgsvik, Gotland.
Melita	United Kingdom	The steamship ran aground on the Susan Rocks, off Ceuta, Spain. Her crew were rescued. She was on a voyage from Benisaf, Algeria to Newport, Monmouthshire.
Nellie	United States	The ship was driven ashore at Red Hook, New York. She was on a voyage from New York to Nice, Alpes-Maritimes, France. She was refloated with assistance.
Pesina	Italy	The barque was abandoned in the Atlantic Ocean before 4 April.
Roscrana	United Kingdom	The ship was driven ashore at False Point, India. She was on a voyage from Singapore, Straits Settlements to Calcutta, India. She was later refloated.
Rowland Hill	Canada]	The barque was abandoned in the Atlantic Ocean before 30 April. She was on a voyage from Saint John, New Brunswick to Liverpool.
Sacafarine	United Kingdom	The brigantine was driven ashore at Blockhouse, County Antrim. She was on a voyage from Silloth, Cumberland to Newry, County Antrim. She was later refloated with assistance and taken in to Warrentpoint, County Antrim.
Sappho	United Kingdom	The schooner was driven ashore and wrecked at Bolama, Portuguese Guinea. She was on a voyage from Liverpool, Lancashire to Bolama.
Sewell	United States	The newly-built tug, awaiting her machinery to be installed by Kerr Brothers at Walkerville, Montana, sank in a storm in mid April. Raised two days later.
South Milton	Flag unknown	The ship struck a rock and sank in the Barwon River. She was on a voyage from Mauritius to Melbourne, Victoria.
St. Athens	United Kingdom	The schooner foundered off the Longships, Cornwall. Her crew were rescued. She was on a voyage from Plymouth, Devon to Runcorn, Cheshire.
St. George	United Kingdom	The ship caught fire at Surabaya, Netherlands East Indies.
Sunrise	United Kingdom	The steamship ran aground at Portland, Dorset. She was on a voyage from Cartagena, Spain to Middlesbrough, Yorkshire.
Union	Flag unknown	The ship was driven ashore on Saltholm, Denmark. She was on a voyage from Randers, Denmark to Malmö, Sweden. She was refloated and completed her voyage in a leaky condition.
Valetta	United Kingdom	The steamship ran aground in the Suez Canal. She was later refloated.
Virginia	United Kingdom	The barque was wrecked in the Cayman Islands. She was on a voyage from Barbados to Apalachicola, Florida, United States.
Wastdale	United Kingdom	The steamship was driven ashore north of Helsingborg, Sweden. She was on a voyage from Middlesbrough to Stettin, Germany. She was refloated and taken in to Copenhagen, Denmark in a leaky condition.
40 unnamed vessels	Russia	The vessels were wrecked by ice in the Volga at Nizhny Novgorod.
