= Chester (placename element) =

Element in English placenames

Distribution of -chester and its variants:
-caster -cester -chester -cetter/-xeter

Chester is a common element in English placenames, derived from Old English ceaster, (Note: This is the West Saxon form (showing diphthongisation). Northumbrian had cæster, while Kentish and Mercian had cester.) meaning "a city or walled town, originally one that had been a Roman station". This word represents a borrowing of Latin castra, meaning "camp". Not all chester names occur at sites of Roman activity, however, which suggests that in some cases the meaning was simply "prehistoric fort". The unpalatalised variant caster is found in certain parts of England, namely Cumbria, northern Lancashire, Yorkshire, the East Midlands, and Norfolk. It is unclear whether the absence of palatalisation is due to Scandinavian influence or dialectal variation within Old English.

In certain cases, ceaster developed into cester, pronounced /sɛstər/ (as in Cirencester) or more often /stər/ (as in Gloucester, Leicester, Worcester, etc.). This is commonly attributed to Anglo-Norman influence, the theory being that Normans were unable to pronounce the [tʃ] of ceaster and hence substituted [ts], which was later simplified to [s]. The second [s] was then deleted, as reflected in medieval forms such as Glouceter and Leyceter (and in some modern forms, e.g. Exeter). Finally, the medial vowel was lost through syncope, giving the modern pronunciations Gloster and Lester. Some reject the Anglo-Norman theory, however, arguing that cester names are more likely to be a product of natural processes within English.

Chester and its variants were sometimes replaced by the related word castle, as in Bewcastle, Horncastle, Castleford, etc.

== A ==
- Acaster Malbis
- Acaster Selby
- Alcester
- Alchester
- Ancaster

== B ==
- Bewcastle, formerly Buthcaster (1263)
- Bicester
- Binchester
- Brancaster

== C ==
- Caister-on-Sea
- Caistor
- Caistor St Edmund
- Casterton, Cumbria
- Casterton, Great, Rutland
- Casterton, Little, Rutland
- Castor, Cambridgeshire
- Chester
  - Cheshire
- Chester, Little, Derby
- Chesterfield
- Chesterford, Great
- Chesterford, Little
- Chester-le-Street
- Chesterton (disambiguation)
- Chesterwood
- Chichester
- Cirencester
- Colchester
- Craster

== D ==
- Doncaster
- Dorchester
- Dorchester-on-Thames, Oxfordshire

== E ==
- Ebchester
- Exeter

== F ==
- Frocester

== G ==
- Gloucester
- Gloster Hill (near Amble, Northumberland)
- Godmanchester
- Grantchester
- Great Casterton

== H ==
- Hincaster
- Horncastle, known in Old English as Hyrnecastre

== I ==
- Ilchester
- Irchester

== K ==
- Kenchester

== L ==
- Lancaster
  - Lancashire
- Lanchester
- Leicester

== M ==
- Mancetter
- Manchester
- Monkchester, modernised form of Munucceaster, the Old English name for Newcastle upon Tyne.
- Muncaster

== P ==
- Portchester

== R ==
- Ribchester
- Rocester
- Rochester, Kent
- Rochester, Northumberland

== S ==
- Silchester

== T ==
- Tadcaster
- Towcester

== U ==
- Uttoxeter

== W ==
- Winchester
- Woodchester
- Worcester
- Wroxeter
