= Chesters =

Chesters may refer to:

== People ==
- Charles Chesters (1904-1993), British botanist
- Daniel Chesters (born 2002), English footballer
- Lisa Chesters (born 1980), Australian politician
- Neville Chesters (1945–2023), music manager

== Places ==
- Chesters (estate), in Scotland
- Chesters (Humshaugh), a mansion located near the fort
- Chesters Roman Fort, in England
- Chesters, Southdean, a location in the Scottish Borders, Scotland

== See also ==
- Chester's, American chicken restaurant
- Chester (disambiguation)
