= List of fellows of the Royal Society elected in 1950 =

This article lists fellows of the Royal Society elected in 1950.

== Fellows ==
1. Boris Babkin
2. Leslie Fleetwood Bates
3. Thomas Archibald Bennet-Clark
4. Brebis Bleaney
5. Leslie Comrie
6. Charles Coulson
7. Leslie Reginald Cox
8. Harold Scott MacDonald Coxeter
9. Gordon Herriot Cunningham
10. William Joseph Elford
11. Sidney Barrington Gates
12. Cecil Hoare
13. Leslie Howarth
14. Sir Ewart Jones
15. Archer John Porter Martin
16. David Forbes Martyn
17. Richard Alan Morton
18. Richard Julius Pumphrey
19. Allen Shenstone
20. Henry Edward Shortt
21. Carl Johan Fredrik Skottsberg
22. Maurice Stacey
23. Leslie Ernest Sutton
24. Richard Laurence Millington Synge
25. Sir Boris Uvarov
26. Sir Frederic Calland Williams

== Foreign members ==
- Walter Sydney Adams
- Carl Ferdinand Cori
- Enrico Fermi

== Statute 12 fellows ==
1. George Macauley Trevelyan
