= List of shipwrecks in December 1885 =

The list of shipwrecks in December 1885 includes ships sunk, foundered, grounded, or otherwise lost during December 1885.

== 1 December ==
List of shipwrecks: 1 December 1885
Ship	State	Description
Aurore, and Fede Amor	Netherlands; Italy	The barque Aurore was run into off the Goodwin Sands, Kent, United Kingdom by the barque Fede Amor and was abandoned. Her crew were rescued by a Spanish steamship. Aurore was on a voyage from Philadelphia, Pennsylvania, United States to Amsterdam, North Holland. She was subsequently taken in tow for Dunkirk, Nord, France by three fishing luggers. Fede Amor was on a voyage from South Shields, County Durham, United Kingdom to Livorno. She was towed in to the River Thames for repairs by the tug Dreadnought (United Kingdom).
Fidelio	Germany	The barque was towed in to Dover, Kent in a capsized condition, having been in collision with another vessel. She was partially righted and the body of a crew member was discovered.
Monarch	United Kingdom	The steamship was damaged by and onboard explosion. She was on a voyage from Cardiff, Glamorgan to Madeira. She put in to Falmouth, Cornwall.

== 2 December ==
List of shipwrecks: 2 December 1885
Ship	State	Description
No. 3	United Kingdom	The pilot boat was run down and sunk off the Bar Lightship ( Trinity House) by the steamship Landana (United Kingdom) with the loss of one of the 21 people on board.

== 3 December ==
List of shipwrecks: 3 December 1885
Ship	State	Description
J. A. Furlong	United Kingdom	The schooner ran aground on the North Bull, off the coast of County Dublin.
Nathaniel	United Kingdom	The schooner was abandoned on the Jordan Flats, in Liverpool Bay. Her crew were rescued by a lifeboat. She was on a voyage from Cork to Weston Point, Cheshire. She was subsequently towed in to New Ferry, Cheshire.c
Palgrave	United Kingdom	The disabled vessel Palgrave was being towed by Deccan (United Kingdom) when the hawser parted while off the coast of Ireland. Deccan lost sight of the vessel and seven of the crew were seriously injured.
Wakefield	United Kingdom	The cargo liner collided with the cargo liner Chester (United Kingdom) and sank in the Humber. Of the 40 people on board, her stewardess drowned. Wakefield was on a voyage from Grimsby, Lincolnshire to Hamburg, Germany.

== 4 December ==
List of shipwrecks: 4 December 1885
Ship	State	Description
Jane Shearer	United Kingdom	The ship was driven ashore at the mouth of the River Bann.

== 5 December ==
List of shipwrecks: 5 December 1885
Ship	State	Description
Daniel	United Kingdom	The ship sank in the River Mersey off New Brighton, Cheshire. Her crew survived. She was on a voyage from Runcorn, Cheshire to Newcastle upon Tyne, Northumberland.
Dorie Emory	United States	The tugs boiler exploded in the North River off Fifty-Seventh Street, New York. All four crew were killed.
Mary Maria	United Kingdom	The ketch was run into by the steamship Glendale (United Kingdom) at Blackwall, Middlesex and was beached.
Oconto	United States	The steamship was wrecked in a gale/snowstorm on Charity Island, Michigan with the loss of a crew member. The rest of her crew and passengers were ferried to the island in her boat. She floated off on 6 April 1886, drifted 20 nautical miles (37 km) and sank in Saginaw Bay near North Island in 14 feet (4.3 m) of water.
St. George	France	The fishing boat collided with another French fishing boat and sank in the English Channel 30 nautical miles (56 km) off Dieppe, Seine-Inférieure. Her crew took to a boat; they were rescued by the steamship Enniskillen (United Kingdom).

== 6 December ==
List of shipwrecks: 6 December 1885
Ship	State	Description
Abissinia	Italy	The steamship was driven ashore and wrecked near Casablanca, Morocco. She was on a voyage from Genoa to the River Plate.
Bretton Hall	United Kingdom	The steamship was driven ashore and wrecked at Sharpham Point, Devon. Her crew were rescued. She was on a voyage from Antwerp, Belgium to Cardiff, Glamorgan.
Burswell	United Kingdom	The steamship was sighted off Dover, Kent whilst on a voyage from the River Tyne to Genoa. No further trace, reported missing.
Grace	United Kingdom	The sloop was abandoned in the North Sea 60 nautical miles (110 km) off Scarborough, Yorkshire. Her crew were rescued by the smack Challenger (United Kingdom).
Kingswear	United Kingdom	The steamship was driven ashore at Greenock, Renfrewshire. She was on a voyage from Glasgow, Renfrewshire to Dublin.
Leader	United Kingdom	A schooner, likely Leader of Inverness, on a voyage from Sunderland, County Durham for Lossiemouth, Moray with coal and six crew, was run into by the steamship Hayle (United Kingdom) and sank about 16 nautical miles (30 km) east of the Bell Rock lighthouse, Fife, United Kingdom. A boat was lowered from Hayle but no survivors were found.
Petrel	United Kingdom	The schooner was driven ashore at Sunderland, County Durham. She was on a voyage from Montrose, Forfarshire to Sunderland. She was refloated on 16 December and taken in to Sunderland.
Ruth	United Kingdom	The Thames barge collided with the sailing barge Emily (United Kingdom) and sank in the River Medway. Her crew survived.

== 7 December ==
List of shipwrecks: 7 December 1885
Ship	State	Description
Flora	United Kingdom	The schooner was driven ashore and wrecked at Osmington, Dorset. Her crew were rescued by the Coastguard. She was on a voyage from Hartlepool, County Durham to Weymouth, Dorset.
Mary Coverdale	United Kingdom	The steamship ran aground at Saltholmen, Denmark. She was on a voyage from Memel, Germany to Hull, Yorkshire. She was refloated and towed in to Helsingør, Denmark.

== 8 December ==
List of shipwrecks: 8 December 1885
Ship	State	Description
Elisabeth	Norway	The ship was abandoned in the North Sea. Some of her crew were rescued by the fishing smack Corsair (United Kingdom).

== 9 December ==
List of shipwrecks: 9 December 1885
Ship	State	Description
Canada	United Kingdom	The barque was wrecked on the Morant Cays. Her ten crew survived. She was on a voyage from Queenstown, County Cork to Mobile, Alabama, United States.
Rose	United Kingdom	The steamship struck the pier and sank at Amble, Northumberland. She was on a voyage from Dundee, Forfarshire to Amble.
Tit	United Kingdom	The Thames barge was run into by the steamship Iona (United Kingdom) and sank in the River Thames at Limehouse, Middlesex.

== 10 December ==
List of shipwrecks: 10 December 1885
Ship	State	Description
Flora	United Kingdom	The ship ran aground on Ormington Ledge. Her crew survived. She was on a voyage from Hartlepool, County Durham to Weymouth, Dorset.
Onward	United States	The fishing schooner ran aground on Hampton Ledge, floated off and sank. Her crew were rescued.

== 11 December ==
List of shipwrecks: 11 December 1885
Ship	State	Description
Charger	United Kingdom	The ship was driven ashore 2 nautical miles (3.7 km) south of Ballywater, County Antrim. She was on a voyage from Belfast, County Antrim to Doboy, Georgia, United States.
Eagle	United Kingdom	The schooner was driven ashore and wrecked near Scourie, Sutherland. Her crew were rescued.
Souverain	Norway	The barque was driven ashore at "Jaederen", Denmark. She was on a voyage from St. Ubes, Portugal to Trondheim. She was a total loss.

== 12 December ==
List of shipwrecks: 12 December 1885
Ship	State	Description
Julia Catherine	Russia	The schooner was abandoned in the Atlantic Ocean. Her crew were rescued by the steamship Rinaldo (United Kingdom). Julia Catherine was on a voyage from Swansea, Glamorgan, United Kingdom to Tunis, Tunisia.
Unnamed	Flag unknown	Wreckage from a large steamship was washed up on the south shore of Guernsey, Channel Islands.

== 13 December ==
List of shipwrecks: 13 December 1885
Ship	State	Description
Beatrice	United Kingdom	The tank barge was run into by the steamship T. E. Foster (United Kingdom) and sank in the River Thames at Blackwall, Middlesex.
Georgina	Canada	The ship departed from Saint Thomas, Virgin Islands for Liverpool, Nova Scotia. No further trace, reported missing.

== 14 December ==
List of shipwrecks: 14 December 1885
Ship	State	Description
Aldebaran	France	The barque foundered in the Atlantic Ocean. Her crew were rescued by the barque Finland (Russia). Aldebaran was on a voyage from Nantes, Loire-Inférieure to Martinique.
Empress	United Kingdom	The schooner was run into by the steamship Risca (United Kingdom) and sank in the River Thames at Gravesend, Kent. She was on a voyage from Chester, Cheshire to Grays, Essex. She was later refloated and towed upstream.
George Franklin	United States	The lighter, under tow of Star (United States), sank 3/4 nautical mile (1.4 km) east south east of Robbin's Reef, New Jersey. Her captain drowned.

== 16 December ==
List of shipwrecks: 16 December 1885
Ship	State	Description
Red Jacket	Portugal	The coaling hulk dragged her anchors and was driven ashore at Funchal, Madeira Island in a heavy gale. She was a total loss.
Veronica	United States	The barque, previously arrived at Funchal, Madeira Island from St. Michael's was cast ashore in a gale and wrecked.

== 17 December ==
List of shipwrecks: 17 December 1885
Ship	State	Description
Alster	United Kingdom	The steamship struck the Three Stone Ore, near Gurnard's Head, Cornwall. She was refloated and headed for St Ives, Cornwall, but sank about 1 1/2 nautical miles (2.8 km) off St. Ives Head. Her fifteen crew were rescued. She was on a voyage from Swansea, Glamorgan to Saint-Nazaire, Loire-Inférieure.
Atlantic	Canada	The ship foundered off Queenstown, County Cork, United Kingdom. Her crew survived. She was on a voyage from South Shields, County Durham, United Kingdom to Buenos Aires, Argentina.
Neva	United Kingdom	The fishing trawler was run into by the steamship Lesbos (Greece) off the Eddystone Rocks, Cornwall with the loss of three of her five crew. Survivors were rescued by Lesbos.
Sussex	United Kingdom	The cargo ship ran aground on Seal Rock, near the Maiden Bower, in the Isles of Scilly and was abandoned by her crew. She broke up in heavy seas during the night of 4–5 January 1886.

== 18 December ==
List of shipwrecks: 18 December 1885
Ship	State	Description
Industry	United Kingdom	The trow collided with the steamship Teviot (United Kingdom) and sank at the mouth of the River Usk. Industry was on a voyage from Newport, Monmouthshire to Portmadoc, Caernarfonshire.
State of Alabama	United Kingdom	The steamship ran aground in Lower New York Bay. She was on a voyage from Glasgow, Renfrewshire to New York. She was refloated with assistance and completed her voyage.
Tangier	United Kingdom	The steamship was driven ashore at Sadras, India whilst going to the assistance of Caramania (Flag unknown). She was on a voyage from Madras, India to London. She was refloated in March 1886 and taken in to Calcutta.

== 19 December ==
List of shipwrecks: 19 December 1885
Ship	State	Description
Charger	United Kingdom	The ship was driven ashore near Ballyhalbert, County Down. She was refloated and taken in to Belfast, County Antrim.
Refulgent	United Kingdom	The steamship collided with the steamship B. Granger (United Kingdom) and was beached at Becton, Middlesex.

== 22 December ==
List of shipwrecks: 22 December 1885
Ship	State	Description
Eliza Hunting	United Kingdom	The steamship was driven ashore and capsized on the coast of Devon. Some of her crew took to a boat and were rescued by a brig. The rest were unaccounted for. Eliza Hunting was on a voyage from Cardiff, Glamorgan to Puerto Mazzaron, Spain.
Gertrude	United Kingdom	The pilot boat was run into and sunk by the steamship Eliza Hunting (United Kingdom) off Penarth, Glamorgan. Her crew were rescued by Eliza Hunting and transferred to another pilot boat.
Glaucus	Queensland	The steamship ran aground on the Kings Reef, off Dunk Island, Queensland. She was on a voyage from Australia to New Zealand or vice versa. She was refloated and resumed her voyage.
Lion	United Kingdom	The smack ran aground at Caernarfon. She was on a voyage from Caernarfon to Pembroke. She was refloated and put back to Caernarfon in a leaky condition.
Sarah Forsyth	United Kingdom	The schooner foundered 2 nautical miles (3.7 km) off Dipper Point. Her crew survived. She was on a voyage from Ayr to Belfast, County Antrim.

== 23 December ==
List of shipwrecks: 23 December 1885
Ship	State	Description
West Jersey	United States	The ferry boat, under tow of F. W. Vosburg (United States), sank 15 to 18 nautical miles (28 to 33 km) north of Barnegat, New Jersey with the loss of her captain.

== 25 December ==
List of shipwrecks: 25 December 1885
Ship	State	Description
Mabel Dilloway	United States	1885 Christmas gale: The fishing schooner sank in a gale on the Georges Bank. Lost with all 16 or 17 crew.

== 26 December ==
List of shipwrecks: 26 December 1885
Ship	State	Description
Cleopatra	United States	1885 Christmas gale: The fishing schooner was dismasted in the gale. Five crew killed. Survivors were rescued the next day by the steamship Lord Gough (United States). Cleopatra was scuttled by burning.
Delia Hartwell	United States	1885 Christmas gale: The schooner dragged anchor in Flagg's Cove, Grand Manan, New Brunswick, Canada. She was fouled by Sabra Killam ( Canada) then was driven ashore and wrecked at Centreville.
Ivanhoe	United States	1885 Christmas gale: The fishing schooner was wrecked on LeHave Bank in the gale, and was abandoned the next day. Her crew were rescued the next day by Gellert (Germany).
Sabra Killam	Canada	1885 Christmas gale: The schooner dragged anchor in Flagg's Cove, fouled Delia Hartwell (United States) then went ashore and wrecked at Centerville. Her captain froze to death.

== 27 December ==
List of shipwrecks: 27 December 1885
Ship	State	Description
Golden Fleece	United Kingdom	The full-rigged ship was wrecked on Fly Island, off Sandalwood Island, Fiji Islands with the loss of two of her crew. She was on a voyage from the Clyde to Shanghai, China.
Governor Loch	(United Kingdom of Great Britain and Ireland) Isle of Man	The schooner ran aground and was severely damaged at Dunfanaghy, County Donegal. She was on a voyage from Dunfanaghy to Londonderry.
John Ray	United Kingdom	The steamship sank in the River Thames near Gravesend, Kent. She was refloated on 21 January 1886 and beached.

== 28 December ==
List of shipwrecks: 28 December 1885
Ship	State	Description
Racer	United States	The schooner sank 16 nautical miles (30 km) off Portland, Maine.
Rhoda	United Kingdom	The schooner was driven ashore at Portrush, County Antrim. She was on a voyage from Maryport, Cumberland to Portrush.

== 29 December ==
List of shipwrecks: 29 December 1885
Ship	State	Description
Ann Webster	United Kingdom	The steamship was run into by the steamship Berno (United Kingdom) and sank in the River Thames near Woolwich, Kent.
Benbow	United Kingdom	The steamship ran aground in the Clyde off Dumbarton.
Neckaron	Norway	The full-rigged ship was abandoned at sea. Her crew were rescued by the fishing smack Charles and Ada (United Kingdom).
Rapid	United Kingdom	The steamship struck the Wembdon, in the Estuary of Bilbao and was severely damaged.

== 30 December ==
List of shipwrecks: 30 December 1885
Ship	State	Description
Ida Louise	United Kingdom	The ship was driven ashore on the French coast. She was on a voyage from Bilbao, Spain to Dunkirk, Nord, France. She was refloated the next day and taken in to Dover, Kent in a leaky condition.
Unnamed	United Kingdom	The cutter capsized off Yellow Ledges in the Isles of Scilly with the loss of one life while on her way to the assist the stranded steamer Sussex (United Kingdom) at Seal Rock.

== 31 December ==
List of shipwrecks: 31 December 1885
Ship	State	Description
Blanche	United Kingdom	The steamship collided with the steamship Tiber (Flag unknown) and sank in the River Thames at Tilbury, Essex. Blanche was on a voyage from London to Dunkirk, Nord, France. She was refloated on 3 January 1886 and beached at Greenhithe, Kent.
Paladin	United Kingdom	The barque was wrecked on Faial Island, Azores. All on board were rescued. She was on a voyage from Boston, Massachusetts, United States to Flores Island, Azores.
Schwan	Germany	The ship was run into by Skerryvore (United Kingdom) in the River Thames at Blackwall, Middlesex and was beached. She was refloated the next day and towed to Limehouse, Middlesex by two tugs.
Virginia Dare	United States	New Year's gale: The schooner sank in a gale on the Grand Banks of Newfoundland with the loss of all fourteen hands.

== Unknown date ==
List of shipwrecks: Unknown date in December 1885
Ship	State	Description
Acacia	United Kingdom	The ship was driven ashore at Cartagena, Spain. She was refloated and found to be leaky.
Albano	United Kingdom	The steamship was driven ashore at Cape Henry, Virginia, United States. She was on a voyage from Philadelphia, Pennsylvania to Baltimore, Maryland, United States.
Alice Tarleton	United States	The schooner collided with another vessel and sank. Her crew were rescued by the schooner Cumberland (United States). Alice Tarleton was on a voyage from Boston, Massachusetts to Port-au-Prince, Haiti.
America	Germany	The steamship was driven ashore in Chesapeake Bay. She was on a voyage from Baltimore to Bremen.
Ardanaz	Spain	The steamship ran aground in the Loire. She was on a voyage from Vinaròs to Saint-Nazaire, Loire-Inférieure, France.
Ariel	United States	The schooner was driven ashore and wrecked at Colón, United States of Colombia.
A. T. Franklin	Flag Unknown	1885 Christmas gale: The schooner was wrecked at Ingall's Point.
Blanche	Norway	The barque was driven ashore and wrecked at Colón.
Bonnie Lassie	United Kingdom	The ship was driven ashore and sank at "Toppershoedje", Netherlands East Indies.
Caramania	Flag unknown	The steamship was driven ashore at Sadras, India on or before 18 December. She was on a voyage from the Clyde to Madras, India. She was later refloated and taken in to Calcutta, where she arrived on 1 January 1886.
Charles A. Hoard	United States	The ship ran aground on the Romer Shoals. She was on a voyage from Saint Croix to New York.
Charles	France	The ship sank off Sark, Channel Islands.
Charles Worsley	United Kingdom	The ship caught fire and was abandoned at sea. She was on a voyage from Chittagong, India to Dundee, Forfarshire. She was subsequently towed in to Calcutta, India.
Christina	Denmark	The ship was driven ashore on the Duddon Sands. She was on a voyage from Liverpool, Lancashire, United Kingdom to Nykøbing. She was refloated and towed in to Barrow-in-Furness, Lancashire in a severely leaky condition.
Christine	Denmark	The brigantine was driven ashore and wrecked on Skagen. She was on a voyage from Grangemouth, Stirlingshire, United Kingdom to Odense.
Claxton	United Kingdom	The steamship was driven ashore and wrecked with the loss of six of her crew. She was on a voyage from Hartlepool, County Durham to Copenhagen Denmark.
Colombia	United Kingdom	The steamship was driven ashore at Tambo de Mora, Peru. She was refloated and taken in to Callao, Peru.
Cyrene	United Kingdom	The ship ran aground at Cochin, India. She was refloated and found to be severely leaky.
Douglas Castle	Norway	The barque was driven ashore and wrecked at Colón.
Duchess of Lancaster	United Kingdom	The barque was driven ashore on the Isla de Flores, Uruguay. She was on a voyage from Newport, Monmouthshire to Riachuelo, Uruguay. She was later refloated.
Eagle	United Kingdom	The schooner was driven ashore and wrecked at Badcall, Sutherland. She was on a voyage from "Glendhue" to Ullapool, Ross-shire.
Elizabeth	Flag unknown	The ship ran aground at Cap-Haïtien, Haiti. She was on a voyage from Cap-Haïtien to Antwerp, Belgium. She was refloated and put back to Cap-Haïtien in a leaky condition.
Elsy	United Kingdom	The steamship was driven ashore at Covehithe, Suffolk. Her five crew were rescued by rocket apparatus. She was on a voyage from London to Lowestoft, Suffolk.
Elvina	United Kingdom	The full-rigged ship was driven ashore and wrecked in a hurricane at Colón.
Evelina	United Kingdom	The brig was driven ashore and wrecked at Colón.
Expert	United Kingdom	The schooner was wrecked near Montrose, Forfarshire.
Exio	Flag unknown	The ship was driven ashore at Batoum, Russia. She was refloated and taken in to Batoum in a leaky condition.
Fortitude	United Kingdom	The fishing smack was driven ashore and wrecked at Donna Nook, Lincolnshire. Her crew were rescued.
Frank Atwood	United States	The schooner was driven ashore and wrecked at Colón.
Florence	United Kingdom	The Thames barge sank in the River Thames at Mucking, Essex.
Friedrich Carrow	Flag unknown	The ship ran aground at Jamaica. She was consequently condemned.
Gazelle	Flag Unknown	1885 Christmas gale: The schooner went ashore at Woodward's Cove.
George Evans	United Kingdom	The smack caught fire at St. Dogmaels, Cornwall and was scuttled.
Golden Sheaf	United Kingdom	The ship was lost.
Grane	Norway	The brig was driven ashore at Galveston, Texas, United States. Her crew were rescued. She was on a voyage from Liverpool to Galveston. She was a total loss.
Greenore	United Kingdom	The dredger sank in the Carlingford Lough. She was refloated on 11 December and taken in to Warrenpoint, County Antrim.
Gutenberg	Germany	The ship was wrecked in the Dry Tortugas. She was on a voyage from New Orleans, Louisiana, United States to Bremen.
Hastings	United Kingdom	The steamship was driven ashore at Dungeness, Kent. She was refloated and resumed her voyage.
Hekla	Netherlands	The steamship was driven ashore at Lemvig, Denmark. She was on a voyage from Stettin, Germany to Amsterdam, North Holland.
Helden	Norway	The barque was driven ashore and wrecked at Colón.
Historian	United Kingdom	The steamship ran aground in the Magdalena River. She was on a voyage from London to Savanilla, United States of Colombia. She was refloated on 29 December and taken in to Colón.
Il Nazarena	Italy	The barque was driven ashore and wrecked on Robben Island, Cape Colony. Her crew were rescued.
Incemore	United Kingdom	The steamship was driven ashore and damaged at Haugesund, Norway. She was on a voyage from Sulina, Romania to Bergen, Norway. She was later refloated.
Inflexible	United Kingdom	The steamship was driven ashore. She was on a voyage from Port Royal, Jamaica to London. She was refloated and taken in to Norfolk, Virginia, United States in a leaky condition and was placed under repair.
Jane Stephenson	United Kingdom	The fishing trawler was driven ashore at Donna Nook. Her crew were rescued.
Johanna von Schubert	Germany	The ship collided with the steamship Essex (United Kingdom) and sank in the Pregel. Johanna von Schubert was on a voyage from Fraserburgh, Aberdeenshire, United Kingdom to Pillau.
John McLaggan	United States	The ship was abandoned at sea. She was on a voyage from Summerside to Philadelphia.
Jupiter	Norway	The barque was driven ashore at Coatzacoalcos, Mexico. She was later refloated and taken in to Coatzacoalcos.
Kamehamaha Iv	United Kingdom	The ship capsized at New York. She was on a voyage from Demerara, British Guiana to New York.
Karnau	Norway	The barque was driven ashore and wrecked at Colón.
Kedron	United Kingdom	The barque was driven ashore at Domesnes, Courland Governorate with the loss of all hands.
Kent, and Lord Howe	United Kingdom	The collier Kent collided with the ketch Lord Howe in the River Thamed and was beached. Lord Howe sank. Her crew were rescued.
King's Lynn	United Kingdom	The steamship ran aground at Gröden, Germany. She was refloated with the assistance of a steamship and resumed her voyage.
Lady of the Lake	United Kingdom	The ship sank off Lowestoft. Her crew were rescued.
Lass o'Down	United Kingdom	The schooner was driven ashore and wrecked near North Berwick, Lothian. Her crew were rescued.
Laura	United Kingdom	The Thames barge was run into by the steamship Thunder (United Kingdom) and was beached at Limehouse, Middlesex.
Lord Beaconsfield	United Kingdom	The fishing smack was driven ashore at Theddlethorpe, Lincolnshire. Her crew survived.
Lynton	United Kingdom	The barque was wrecked near Aspinwall, United States of Colombia with the loss of all hands. She was on a voyage from South Shields, County Durham to Aspinwall.
Magician	United Kingdom	The full-rigged ship collided with the full-rigged ship Ben Douran (United Kingdom) and sank with the loss of a crew member. Magician was on a voyage from Cardiff, Glamorgan to San Francisco, California, United States.
Marathon	United Kingdom	The ship was driven ashore at Heidle Point, Peru. She was a total loss.
Marie Frederike	Russia	The schooner foundered off "East Bolderaa". Her crew were rescued.
Mary Coverdale	United Kingdom	The steamship was driven ashore at Thisted, Denmark.
Mayflower	United Kingdom	The schooner was abandoned off "Voel Nant".
Minnie	Flag Unknown	1885 Christmas gale: The schooner was wrecked at Brown's Point.
Moel-y-Don	United Kingdom	The barque was driven ashore near Rosses Point, County Sligo.
Morasize	United Kingdom	The ship sank with the loss of all hands.
Montevideo	Argentina	The steamship ran aground in the Paraguay River.
Nameless, and St. Helier	United Kingdom	The brigantine Nameless collided with the steamship St. Helier at Penarth, Glamorgan. Both vessels were severely damaged and put in to Cardiff for repairs. Nameless was on a voyage from Cardiff to Youghal, County Cork. St. Helier was on a voyage from Cardiff to Palermo, Sicily, Italy.
Nanny	Flag unknown	The barque was driven ashore at Helsinki, Grand Duchy of Finland.
Nimrod	Netherlands	The brig ran aground on the Middelgrund, in the Baltic Sea. She was on a voyage from Gävle, Sweden to Delfzijl, Groningen.
Nockar	Norway	The full-rigged ship was abandoned in the North Sea on or before 31 December.
Norway	United Kingdom	The steamship ran aground in the Scheldt at Terneuzen, Zeeland, Netherlands. She was on a voyage from Brăila, Romania to Ghent, East Flanders, Belgium.
Ocean	Norway	The full-rigged ship was driven ashore and wrecked near Quiberon, Morbihan, France. She was on a voyage from Mobile, Alabama, United States to London, United Kingdom.
Océan	France	The barque was driven ashore and wrecked at Colón.
Ortolan	Norway	The brig was driven ashore and wrecked at Colón.
Pachumba	United Kingdom	The steamship ran aground at "Linga", Persia. She was refloated.
Papua	Germany	The steamship ran aground on the Osprey Reef, in the Torres Strait.
Peter	Denmark	The schooner was driven ashore on Hirsholmene. She was on a voyage from Bandholm to Arendal, Norway.
Pioneer	United Kingdom	The steamship was driven ashore at Eyemouth, Berwickshire. She was on a voyage from Sunderland, County Durham to Dundee. She was later refloated.
Rocklands	United Kingdom	The steamship was driven ashore at Cádiz, Spain.
Rover of the Seas	United Kingdom	The ship foundered at sea. Her crew were rescued. She was on a voyage from "Victoria, V.I." to Liverpool.
Ryerson	United Kingdom	The full-rigged ship caught fire at New Orleans. She was on a voyage from New Orleans to Liverpool.
Sadie Ankers	Flag unknown	The ship was abandoned off Cozumel, Mexico. Her crew survived. She was on a voyage from Porto Cortez, Honduras to London.
Salmon	Canada	The ship ran aground at Fleetwood, Lancashire. She was on a voyage from Saint John, New Brunswick to Fleetwood. She was refloated and found to be waterlogged.
Seagull	United Kingdom	The smack was driven ashore in Malltraeth Bay. Her crew were rescued. She was on a voyage from Kidwelly, Carmarthenshire to Garston, Lancashire.
Seenymphe	Germany	The schooner was wrecked at Durban, Natal Colony. Her crew were rescued.
Silica	United Kingdom	The barque was wrecked near the mouth of the Tonalá River. She was on a voyage from Colón to Minatitlán, Mexico.
Skinfaxe	Norway	The ship was abandoned in the Atlantic Ocean. Her crew were rescued. She was on a voyage from Newport, Monmouthshire to Guadeloupe.
Southwood	United Kingdom	The steamship ran aground on the St. Lambert Bank, in the Gironde. She was on a voyage from Carloforte, Sardinia, Italy to Bordeaux, Gironde, France.
St. Andrews Bay	United Kingdom	The steamship was driven ashore in Chesapeake Bay. She was on a voyage from Baltimore to Bordeaux. She was later refloated and resumed her voyage.
Stella Catalina	United States of Colombia	The barque was driven ashore and wrecked at Colón.
Storra Lee	United Kingdom	The steamship ran aground at Maassluis, South Holland, Netherlands. She was on a voyage from Sulina to Rotterdam, South Holland. She was refloated with assistance and resumed her voyage.
Theodore	Russia	The schooner collided with the barque Trimpus (Russia) and ran aground off the coast of Sweden. Theodor was on a voyage from South Shields to Liepāva. She was refloated and towed in to Helsingborg in a severely damaged condition.
Theodore Reimers	Germany	The ship was driven ashore at Hela. She was on a voyage from Fraserburgh, Aberdeenshire, United Kingdom to Danzig.
Three Brothers	United Kingdom	The fishing trawler was driven ashore and wrecked at the Heugh Lighthouse, County Durham. Her crew were rescued.
Tigri	Austria-Hungary	The barque was driven ashore and wrecked at Colón.
Tolfaen	United Kingdom	The steamship collided with the steamship King Ja Ja (United Kingdom) off Plasnewydd. She was beached at "Raynol".
Tweed	United Kingdom	The tug was driven ashore at Penarth, Glamorgan. Her crew were rescued.
Universal	United Kingdom	The steamship ran aground on the Borneira Rock, in Vigo Bay and was severely damaged. She was on a voyage from Cartagena, Spain to Workington, Cumberland. She was refloated and taken in to port.
Veronica	United States	The barque was driven ashore and wrecked at Madeira. Her crew were rescued.
Veteran	United States	The barquentine was driven ashore and wrecked at Colón.
Viceroy	United Kingdom	The steamship foundered in the Atlantic Ocean. Her crew were rescued by the barque Laurel (United Kingdom). Viceroy was on a voyage from New Orleans to Bremen.
Waikna	United States	The yacht was driven ashore at Sandy Hook, New Jersey. She was on a voyage from New York to British Honduras.
Wergeland	Norway	The brig put in to Cowes, Isle of Wight on fire. Attempts by HMS Hector (Royal Navy) to extinguish the fire were unsuccessful and she was scuttled.
W. Rohl	Germany	The barque caught fire and sank at Rio de Janeiro. She was on a voyage from Iquique, Chile to Hamburg.
Unnamed	Flag unknown	The brigantine ran aground and sank on the East Hoyle Bank, in Liverpool Bay.
Unnamed	France	The pilot boat sank off the La Coubre Lighthouse, Gironde.
Unnamed	Flag unknown	The brig was driven ashore at the Shornemead Fort, Kent.
