= Cheshire County =

Cheshire County is the name of two counties:

- Cheshire County, New Hampshire in the United States
- Cheshire in north west England, United Kingdom
- Chester County
