= Thomas Bennet-Clark =

British biologist (1903–1975)

- Born: Thomas Archibald Bennet-Clark
- Education: Trinity College, Cambridge
- Awards: FRS (1950)
- Scientific career
- Workplaces: University of Manchester; University of Nottingham; King's College London; University of East Anglia

Thomas Archibald Bennet-Clark CBE FRS (13 January 1903 – 24 November 1975) was a British biologist.

== Early life ==
He was born in Edinburgh the son of Thomas Bennet-Clark, a chartered accountant with the Edinburgh firm of R. & G. Scott, and his wife, Anne Chalmers Hanna.

He was educated at Wells House School at Malvern Wells and then Marlborough College and Trinity College, Cambridge.

== Career ==
He was a Lecturer at the University of Manchester from 1930 to 1936; Professor of Botany at the University of Nottingham from 1936 to 1944; Professor of Botany at King's College London from 1944 to 1962; Professor of Biology and Dean of the School of Biological Sciences at the University of East Anglia from 1962 to 1967, and Professor Emeritus of Biology at the University of East Anglia from 1967.

In Birmingham his position was filled by Prof Charles Chesters.

He was the first executive editor of the Journal of Experimental Botany, which published its first issue in 1950.

== Awards and honours ==
He was elected a Fellow of the Royal Society (FRS) in 1950 and awarded a CBE in 1966.

== Family ==
He married Constance Haythornthwaite in 1926.
