= Quenington =

Village in Gloucestershire, England

Coordinates: 51.736°N 1.792°W

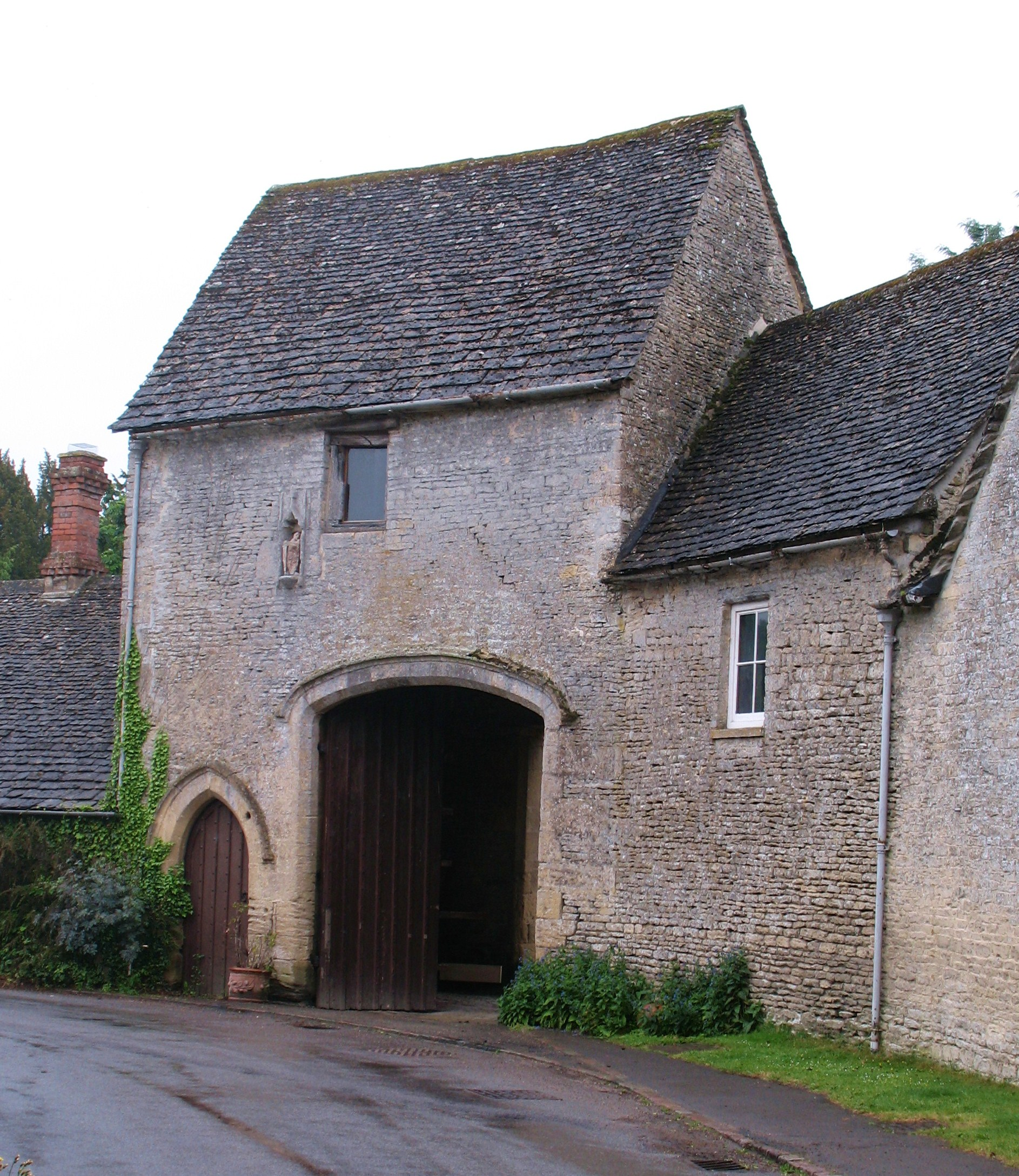
- Knights Hospitallers' Gateway, circa 12th century, Quenington village centre

- Location within Gloucestershire
- Population: 603 (2011 Census)
- OS grid reference: SP144044
- Civil parish: Quenington
- District: Cotswold
- Shire county: Gloucestershire
- Region: South West
- Country: England
- Sovereign state: United Kingdom
- Post town: Fairford
- Postcode district: GL7
- Dialling code: 01285
- Police: Gloucestershire
- Fire: Gloucestershire
- Ambulance: South Western
- UK Parliament: North Cotswolds

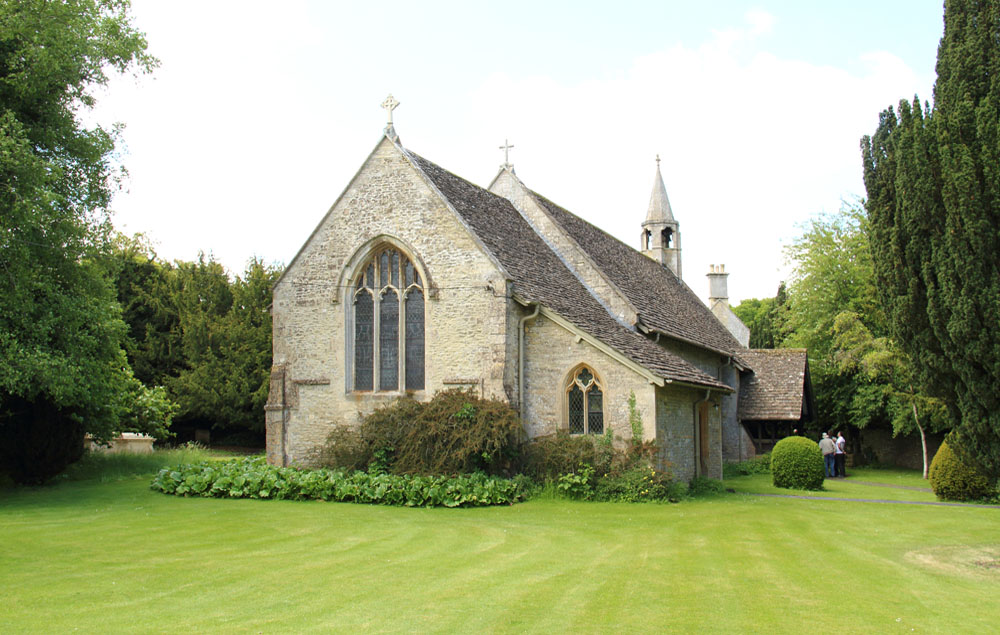
St Swithin's Church

Quenington is a nucleated village and larger rural civil parish in the Cotswold district of Gloucestershire, England, on the River Coln 8 miles (13 km) east of Cirencester and 2 miles (3.2 km) north of Fairford. It had a recorded population of 603 at the 2011 census.

Important historic buildings include a medieval large dovecote above a gatehouse, and St Swithin's Church of England parish church, built mainly in the late 11th century, which are Grade I listed buildings. The village has a village hall, a pub and a village green. Its economy has been transformed to render agriculture a minor but physically evident employer across most of the area: this area of the Cotswolds has been almost wholly been turned over from forest to agriculture, landscape parks and private or semi-private gardens. The working population divides includes mainly short-distance commuters and remote workers. A significant minority work in the district's leisure, food and hospitality sector. The Cotswold Water Park lies to the south and the Cotswold scarp is away to the north and west.

== History ==
=== Etymology ===
The place-name 'Quenington' is first attested in the Domesday Book of 1086, where it appears as Qvenintone. This is from the Old English 'Cwenenatun' meaning 'the women's town or settlement' (the word 'queen' has the same derivation).

It had previously been suggested that the name Quenington could have meant "settlement on the Coln", the river which flows through the village, though the name 'Coln' is of unknown origin. Quenington is mentioned in the Domesday Book in relation to two mills at either end of the village, a water mill and a fulling mill, both now private residences.

=== 12th century ===
The Knights Hospitallier order had a preceptory which was all but demolished by the 1600s. The Gateway is the only part remaining.

=== 14th century ===
There are records of sheep-rearing at this time.

=== 18th century ===
Enclosure was established in the village by 1754, making the previously common open-fields, private. However, what is now the village green was declared to be kept as common land.

There was a paper-mill close to the church and a rectory during this period.

=== 19th century ===
John Marius Wilson's Imperial Gazetteer of England and Wales of 1870 describes Quenington as:

"QUENINGTON, a village and a parish in Cirencester district, Gloucester. The village stands on the Fosseway and the river Coln, 2 miles N. of Fairford, and 8 E. by N. of Cirencester"

There was a school in the village north-east of the church. Additionally, Quenington House was a farmhouse - part of the Hatherop Estate.

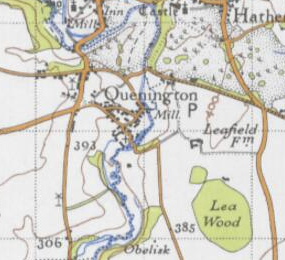
Excerpt of historical map showing Quenington

== Economy ==
The main economy of 1881 was based around agriculture, though the occupation of a large proportion of the population was unknown: they may have been involved in various miscellaneous workings or were simply unemployed at the time. There was a high proportion of females working in the domestic or office sector. As of 2011 the majority of people work in business, manufacturing and retail. Agriculture now employs 17 people of a population of 603, compared to 61 from a population of 380 in 1881. The change in occupation can be credited to advances in the internet and automotive travel. In 2001, the bulk of the working population of 203 split into 43% who worked from home and 46% who travelled 2 to 20 kilometres to work.

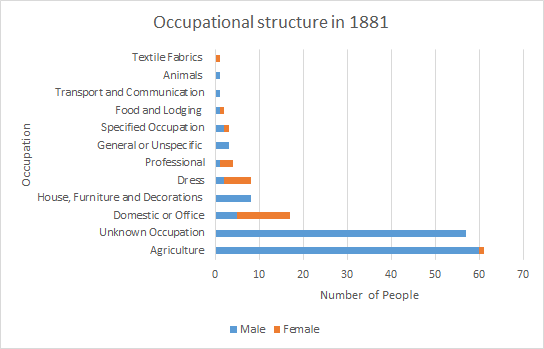
Chart showing occupational structure of males and females of Quenington in 1881, (The Vision of Britain website)

Chart showing occupational structure of Quenington in 2011, (Neighbourhood Statistics website)

== Population ==
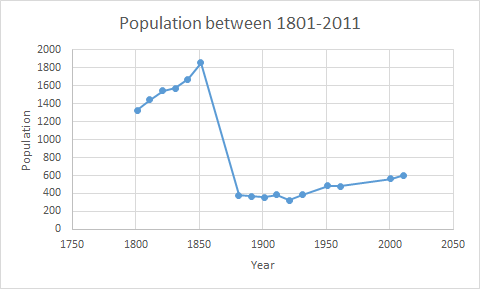
Population of Quenington, in the censuses of 1801–2011

The population of Quenington in 1801 was 1,326 and steadily grew to 1,859 by 1851, but the next records in 1881 show a drop of 1,479 to 380, possibly due to changes to the parish border. In 1911 the total population was 388, which decreased in 1921 to 322, which could be partly attributed to World War I.

== Transport ==
The B349 runs from the village transporting school children to Fairford and is not available to the general public. The service only operates during term time and is run by Denwell Minicoaches. The B865 runs from Lechlade to Cirencester stopping at Quenington and 17 other stops. It is operated by APL Travel and runs one journey on a Tuesday, Thursday and Saturday.

== St Swithin's Church ==
The church is considered by the body statutorily appointed to safeguard old English and Welsh buildings from demolition to have been built around 1100, tying it in with records supporting its dedication to St Mary under the locally wealthy De Laci family. The Knights Templar took over the running of the church in 1193 from St Peter's Abbey, Gloucester, to whom the church had been granted (or by whom appropriated) 55 years earlier in 1138. The church currently has Grade I listed status. When first built the church was dedicated to the Virgin Mary. It was then rededicated to St Swithin following the 16th-century Reformation. Its most notable features are two richly decorated Norman doorways: the tympanum above the north doorway features the Harrowing of Hell, and that above the south doorway the Coronation of the Virgin, said to be the oldest representation in Europe that is still in situ. The church was extensively restored in the 1880s by Frederick Waller.

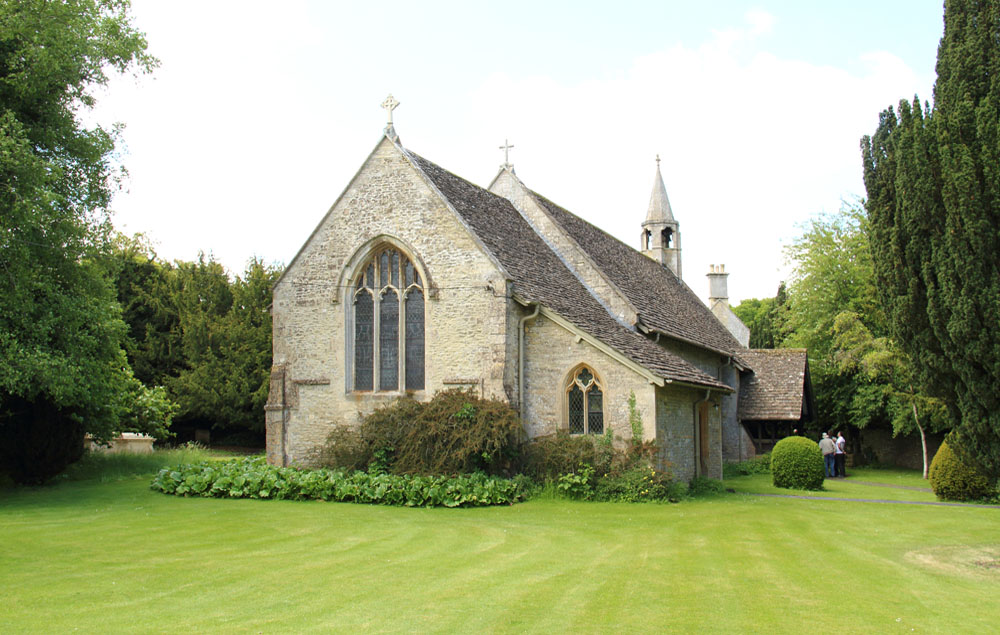
St Swithin's Church

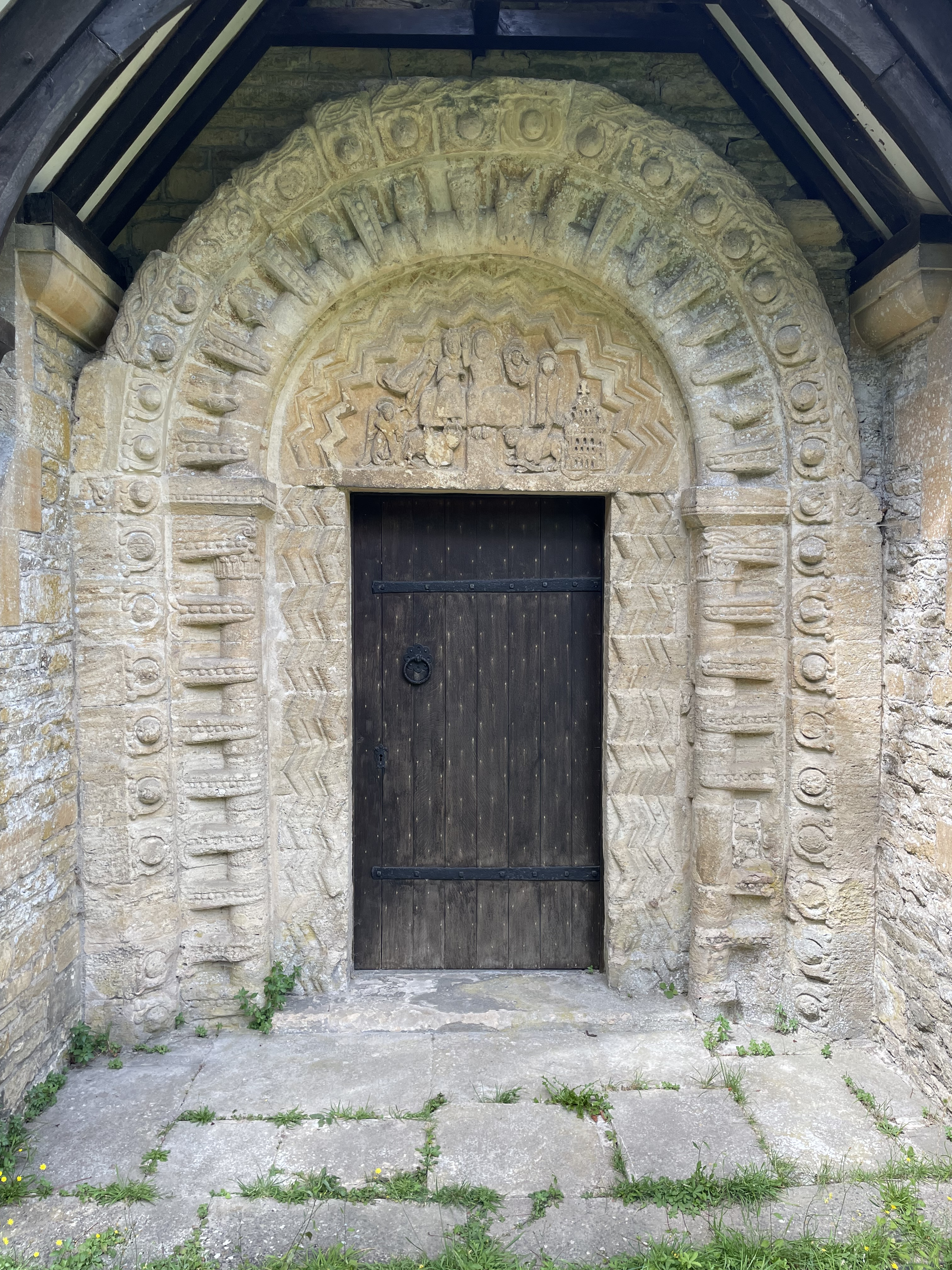
Archway on the south side of the church

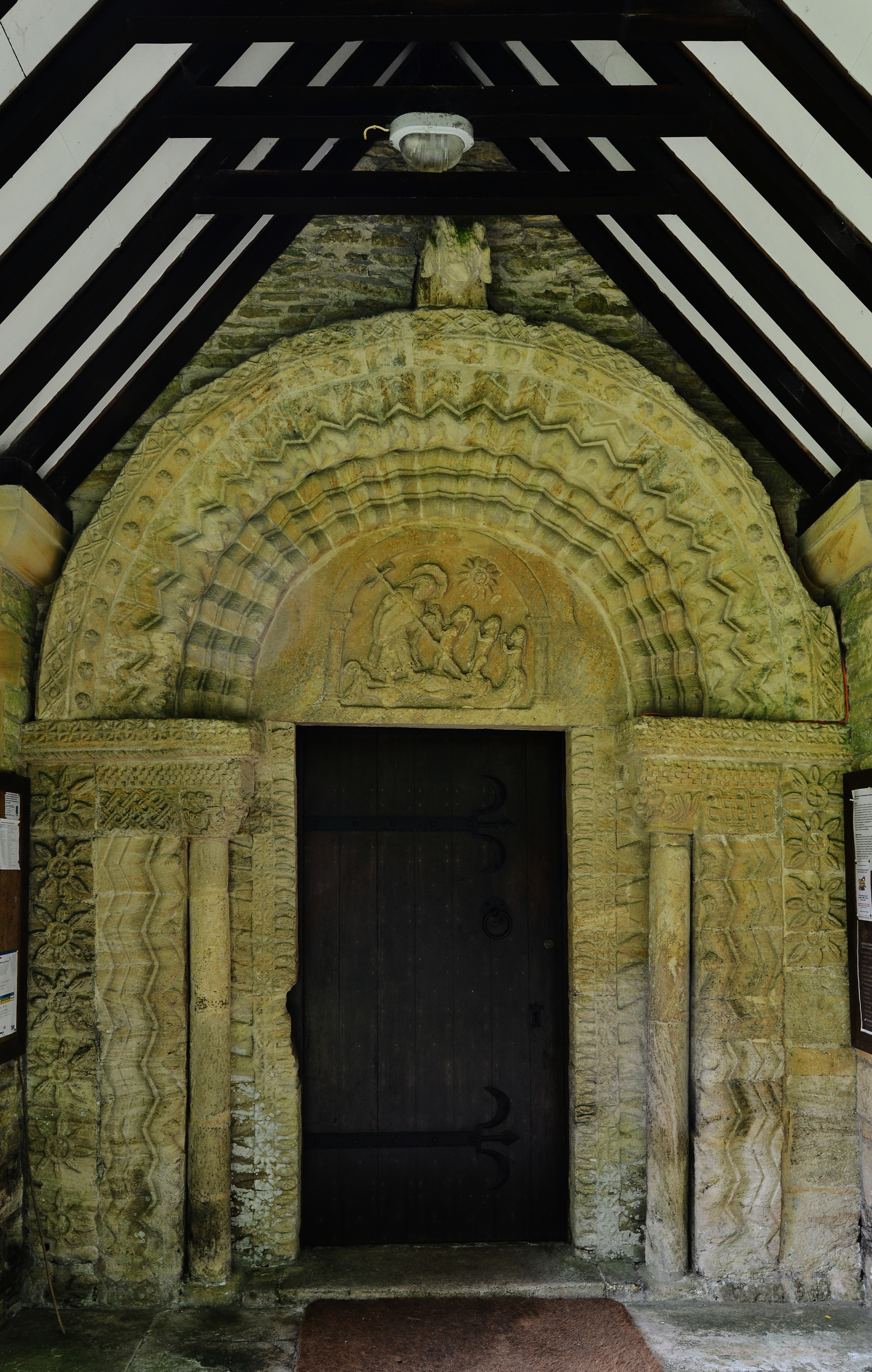
The North doorway of the church

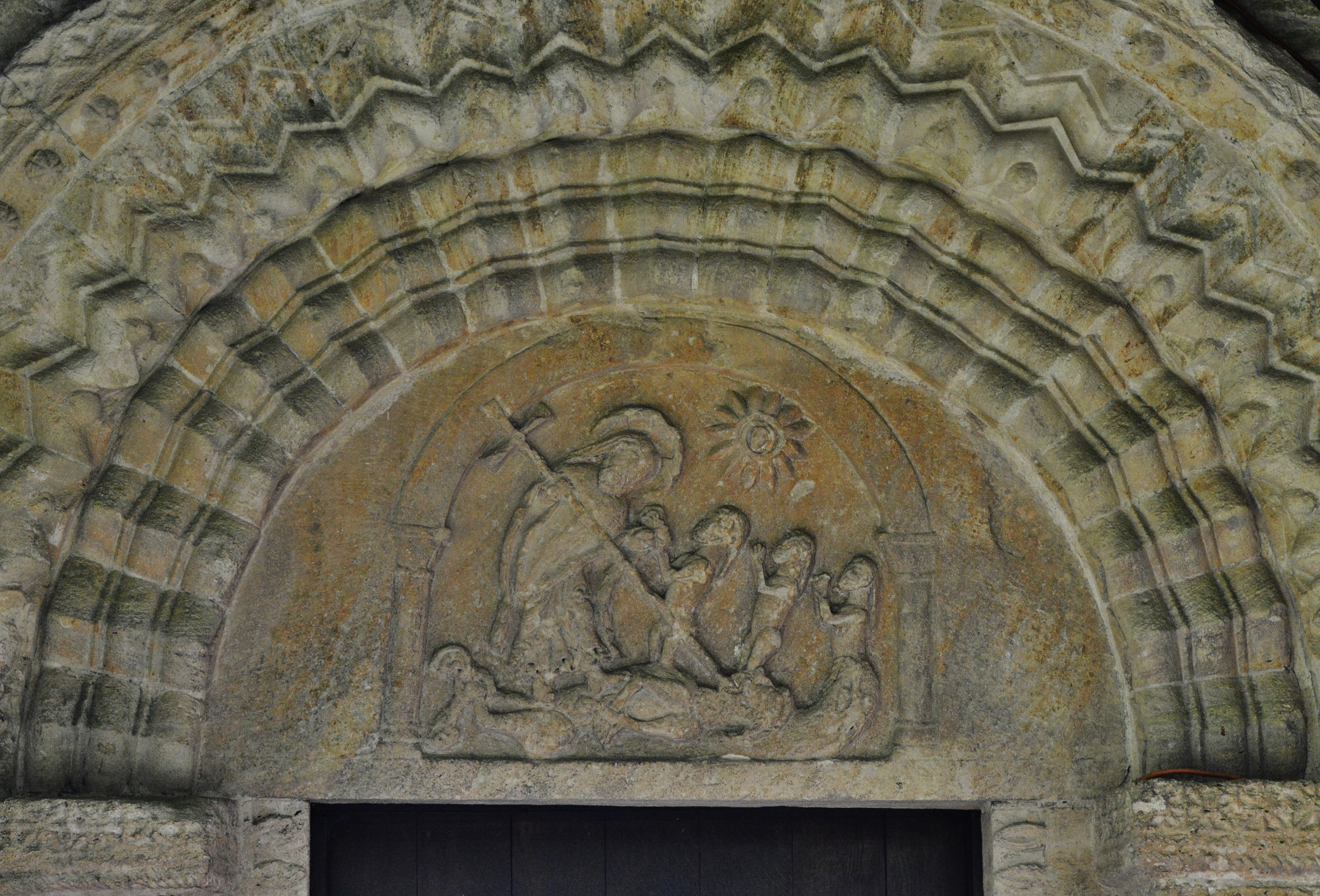
Close up of the North doorway

== Village hall ==
In 1906 the Quenington Institute was donated to the village by Thomas Bazley, a local landowner, to be used as a village meeting place. In January 2013, the village hall moved to new premises: the Gate on the Green had been used as a chapel since 1926 until services ended in 2010. The name was officially changed to Quenington Village Hall and the facility opened on 11 May 2013.

== In film, literature and the media ==
The village pub, The Keepers Arms, featured in the Four In A Bed reality series made by Channel 4 in the summer of 2014 and were crowned winners of the competition. The episode aired in early 2015. The pub also featured in Channel 5's Fifth Gear, where Dom Joly pointed a tank at it. It also stood in as the List and Newt pub in the fictional village of Crinkley Bottom in the 1990s TV series Noel's House Party.

== Notable residents ==
- Kenton Cool (born 30 July 1973) English mountaineer, alpinist and IFMGA mountain guide.
- The botanist Prof Charles Chesters FRSE (1904–1993) retired here in 1969 and died here.
- Dom Joly (born 1967), British comedian.
