= William A. Moffett =

US Navy admiral and Medal of Honor recipient (1869–1933)

William Adger Moffett
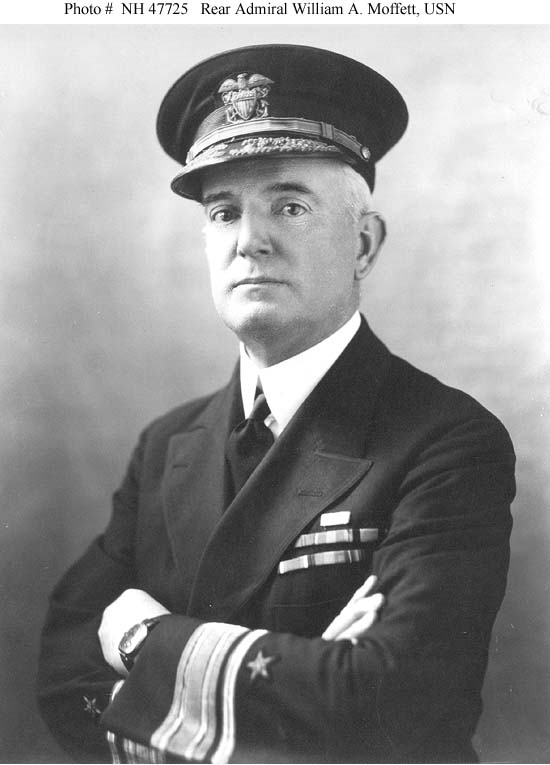
- Rear Admiral William A. Moffett
- Born: 31 October 1869; Charleston, South Carolina, U.S.
- Died: 4 April 1933 (aged 63) off the coast of New Jersey, U.S.
- Burial place: Arlington National Cemetery
- Military career
- Allegiance: United States
- Branch: United States Navy
- Service years: 1890–1933
- Rank: Rear Admiral
- Commands: USS Chester (CL-1); Great Lakes Naval Training Center; USS Mississippi (BB-41); Bureau of Aeronautics
- Conflicts: Spanish–American War; *Capture of Guam; *Battle of Manila (1898); Mexican Revolution; *Battle of Veracruz; World War I
- Awards: Medal of Honor; Navy Distinguished Service Medal; Silver Lifesaving Medal

William Adger Moffett (31 October 1869 – 4 April 1933) was an American admiral and Medal of Honor recipient known as the architect of naval aviation in the United States Navy.

== Biography ==
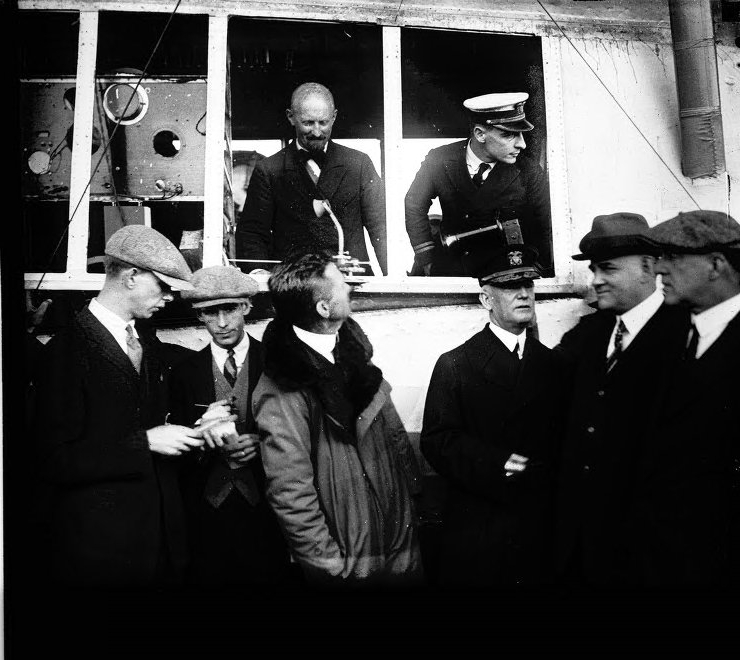
Admiral Moffett meets the airship Shenandoah and crew, during flight test landing at St. Louis Flying Field, on 2 October 1923

Born 31 October 1869, in Charleston, South Carolina, he graduated from the United States Naval Academy in 1890. He was the son of George Hall Moffett (1829–1875), who enlisted in the Confederate States army as a private, and was promoted for bravery on the field of battle, eventually attaining the rank of Captain and adjutant-general, Hagood's Brigade, Twenty-fifth South Carolina Volunteers.

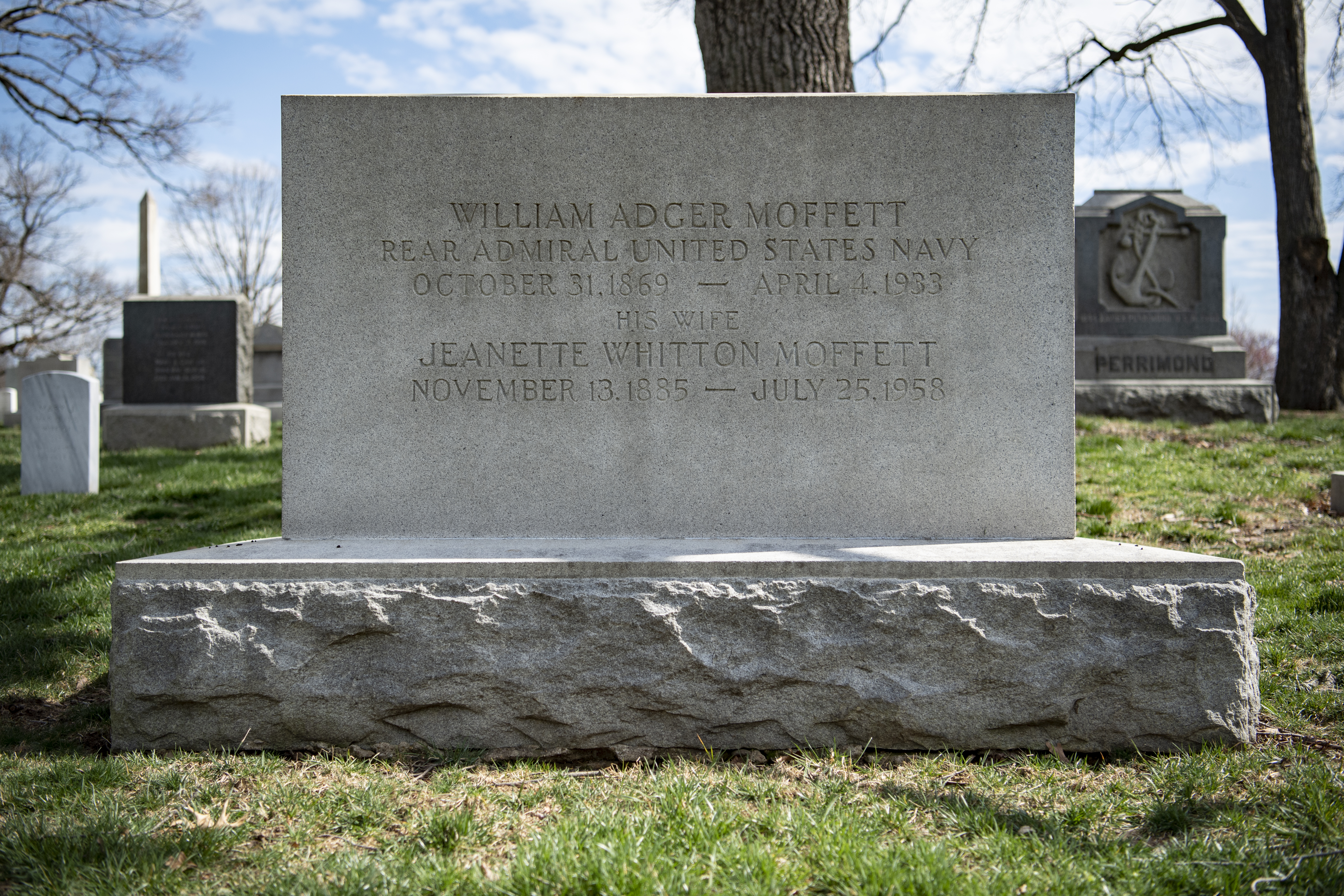
Grave at Arlington National Cemetery

Moffett was on USS Charleston (C-2) when she sailed across the Pacific and captured Guam. Ultimately ending up in the Philippines, a month after the US victory at Manila Bay, the Charleston then shelled enemy positions in support of American and Filipino troops at the Battle of Manila (1898).

Commander Moffett was the captain of the Chester during the Tampico Affair. In December 1915 Moffett received the Medal of Honor for his captaincy of the USS Chester in a daring and dangerous night landing in 1914 at Veracruz, Veracruz, Mexico. (See also United States occupation of Veracruz, 1914). (See text of the Citation set forth below.)

In World War I, he was commander of the Great Lakes Naval Training Center near Chicago, where he established an aviator training program. While commanding the battleship USS Mississippi (1918–1921) he supported the creation of a scout plane unit on the ship.

Although not himself a flyer, Moffett became known as the "Air Admiral" for his leadership of the Navy's Bureau of Aeronautics from its creation in 1921 with Captain Henry C. Mustin as its first Assistant Chief. In this role, he oversaw the development of tactics for naval aircraft, the introduction of the aircraft carrier, and relations with the civilian aircraft industry. A master politician, he maintained official support for naval aviation against Billy Mitchell, who favored putting all military aircraft into a separate air force. In that regard, Moffett benefited from his longstanding friendship with Franklin D. Roosevelt, who had been appointed Assistant Secretary of the Navy by Woodrow Wilson in 1913.

Moffett was a strong advocate of the development of lighter-than-air craft, and lost his life when the USS Akron, then the largest dirigible in the world, crashed in the Atlantic Ocean during a storm off the coast of New Jersey on 4 April 1933.

He is buried in Arlington National Cemetery, alongside his wife Jeanette Whitton Moffett (1885–1958), and one of their three sons, William Adger Moffett, Jr. (1910–2001), who was also a Navy admiral.

In 2008, Moffett was inducted into the National Aviation Hall of Fame in Dayton, Ohio.

== Decorations ==
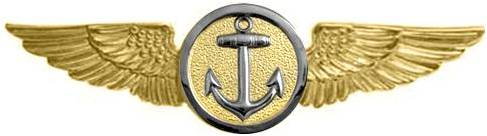

- Top – Naval Aviation Observer wings.
- 1st row – Medal of Honor
- 2nd row – Navy Distinguished Service Medal, Silver Lifesaving Medal, Navy Spanish Campaign Medal
- 3rd row – Philippine Campaign Medal, Mexican Service Medal, World War I Victory Medal

=== Medal of Honor citation ===
Rank and organization: Commander, U.S. Navy. Entered service at: Charleston, South Carolina Born: 31 October 1869, Charleston, South Carolina G.O. No.: 177, 4 December 1915. Other Navy award: Distinguished Service Medal.

Citation:

For distinguished conduct in battle, engagements of Vera Cruz, 21 and 22 April 1914. Comdr. Moffett brought his ship into the inner harbor during the nights of the 21st and 22d without the assistance of a pilot or navigational lights, and was in a position on the morning of the 22d to use his guns at a critical time with telling effect. His skill in mooring his ship at night was especially noticeable. He placed her nearest to the enemy and did most of the firing and received most of the hits.

== Namesake ==
- The USS Moffett (DD-362) was named for him.
- The naval air station that he helped establish in Sunnyvale, California was renamed Moffett Field in his memory soon after his death.
- Mount Moffett, a mountain in Alaska.
- John Philip Sousa's march, "The Aviators" is dedicated to William A. Moffett, the man responsible for Sousa's enlistment and commission in the American Navy during World War I.
- In May 1999, NAVAIR dedicated its headquarters building to William A. Moffett.

== See also ==
- List of Medal of Honor recipients (Veracruz)
- Bureau of Aeronautics
- Naval aviation
- U.S. Occupation of Veracruz, Mexico, 1914
