= Chesterville =

Chesterville may refer to:

Canada

- Chesterville, Ontario
- Chesterville, Quebec

South Africa

- Chesterville, KwaZulu-Natal

United States

- Chesterville, Indiana
- Chesterville, Maine
- Chesterville, Maryland
- Chesterville, Ohio
- Chesterville, Texas
- Chesterville, West Virginia
