= Chester City =

Chester City or City of Chester may refer to:

- Chester, a city in Cheshire, England
- Chester City F.C., a former association football club in Chester
- Chester (non-metropolitan district), the former local government district surrounding Chester
- City of Chester (UK Parliament constituency)
- The city of Chester, Pennsylvania

== Ships ==
- RMS City of Chester, 1873 British transatlantic liner
- SS City of Chester, 1875 US coastal steamer wrecked at the Golden Gate near San Francisco, California

== See also ==
- Chester (disambiguation)
