= Chester-class cruiser =

Class of American naval ships

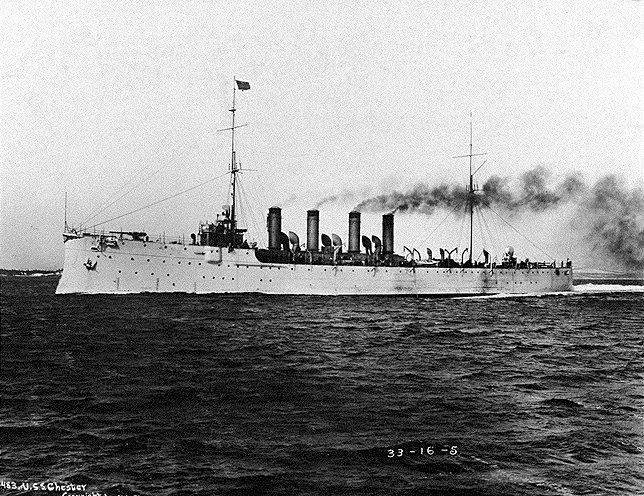
- USS Chester

Class overview
- Name: Chester class
- Builders: Bath Iron Works, ME (1); Fore River Shipyard, MA (2)
- Operators: United States Navy
- Preceded by: St. Louis class
- Succeeded by: Omaha class
- Built: 1905–1908
- In commission: 1908–1923
- Planned: 3
- Completed: 3
- Scrapped: 3

General characteristics (as built)
- Type: Scout cruiser
- Displacement: 3,750 long tons (3,810 t) normal; 4,687 long tons (4,762 t) Full
- Length: 423.1 ft (129.0 m)
- Beam: 47.1 ft (14.4 m)
- Draft: 16.8 ft (5.1 m)
- Installed power: 12 × boilers; Engines and horsepower varied by ship
- Propulsion: 4 × screws (Chester); 2 × screws
- Speed: 24 kn (44.4 km/h; 27.6 mph)
- Boats & landing craft carried: 2 × lifeboats
- Complement: 359
- Armament: 2 × 5"/50 caliber guns; 6 × 3"/50 caliber guns; 2 × 3-pounder saluting guns; 2 × 21" torpedo tubes
- Armor: Belt: 2 in (51 mm); Deck: 1 in (25 mm) over steering gear

The three Chester-class cruisers were the first United States Navy vessels to be designated as fast "scout cruisers" for fleet reconnaissance. They had high speed but little armor or armament. They were authorized in January 1904, ordered in fiscal year 1905, and completed in 1908. In 1920 all scout cruisers were redesignated as "light cruisers" (CL).

Birmingham was the first ship in the world to launch an airplane, in 1910 with pilot Eugene Ely, who also performed the first landing on a ship the following year, on USS Pennsylvania. The class patrolled the Caribbean prior to World War I, sometimes supporting military interventions, with Chester playing a key role at the start of the United States occupation of Veracruz in 1914. The ships escorted convoys in World War I. The class was decommissioned 1921-1923 and sold for scrap to comply with the limits of the London Naval Treaty in 1930.

== Design and construction ==
=== Ship type ===
The three Chesters were the US Navy's only ships to be commissioned with the "scout cruiser" (hull classification symbol non-standard at the time, CS or SCR are sometimes used) designation, and were characterized by high speed and little armor or armament. They were also the last cruisers of any type built for the US Navy until the first Omaha-class cruisers were laid down in 1917 (the Navy concentrated on building dreadnought battleships and destroyers in the interim). The first three Omaha-class ships were also designated "scout cruisers" (CS or SCR) when ordered, but before any were launched the Navy revised its classification system and they and the Chesters became "light cruisers" (CL).

=== Armament ===
The as-built armament included two 5 in (127 mm)/50 caliber Mark 6 guns, six 3 in (76 mm)/50 caliber rapid fire (RF) guns, and two 21 inch (533 mm) torpedo tubes. The original design featured a uniform gun armament of twelve 3-inch guns, which was supported by the Navy's General Board as simplifying fire control and echoing the uniform main and secondary armaments of dreadnought battleships. However, two 5-inch guns were substituted for six of the 3-inch guns, apparently to enable the scout cruisers to fight foreign light cruisers. Notably, for the first time in US cruiser design smaller caliber weapons (6-pounder and smaller) were not fitted.

=== Armor ===
The armor of these ships was very light. A 2 in (51 mm) belt extended 9.5 ft (2.9 m) above the waterline in the engine and generator room area, 6.5 ft (2.0 m) above the waterline in the boiler room area, and 3.25 ft (1 m) below the waterline for its entire length. There was no protective deck, only a 1 in (25 mm) deck above the steering gear.

=== Engineering ===
The three ships had different propulsion plants so they could be compared: Chester was the first major combatant in the USN to receive steam turbine propulsion of the Parsons type, Salem received Curtis turbines, and Birmingham traditional triple-expansion engines. The design speed was 24 kn (27.6 mph; 44.4 km/h) for the triple-expansion ship and up to 25 kn (28.8 mph; 46.3 km/h) for the turbine ships.

Chester had twelve coal-fired Normand boilers and Parsons direct-drive steam turbines totaling 23,000 shp (17,000 kW) on four shafts. She made 26.52 kn (30.5 mph; 49.1 km/h) on trials at an estimated 16,000 shp (12,000 kW).

Birmingham had twelve coal-fired Fore River boilers supplying 275 psi (1,900 kPa) steam to two four-cylinder vertical triple-expansion engines totaling 16,000 ihp (12,000 kW) (design) on two shafts. She made 24.33 kn (28.0 mph; 45.1 km/h) on trials at 15,670 ihp (11,690 kW).

Salem had twelve coal-fired Fore River boilers and Curtis direct-drive steam turbines totaling 23,900 shp (17,800 kW) (design) on two shafts. She made 25.95 kn (29.9 mph; 48.1 km/h) on trials at 22,242 shp (16,586 kW).

Normal coal capacity was 475 tons, which could be increased to 1,400 tons.

=== Refits ===
All three ships were refitted in 1917 to prepare for service in World War I. Salem had her main engines replaced with a 20,000 shp (15,000 kW) General Electric geared steam turbine installation due to high coal consumption. All three received an armament upgrade, with four new 5-inch (127 mm)/51 caliber guns replacing the 5-inch/50 caliber guns as well as two of the 3-inch/50 caliber , two 3-inch/50 caliber single-purpose guns (four being removed), and two 3-inch/50 caliber anti-aircraft guns added. The submerged torpedo tubes were retained.

== Ships in class ==
The three ships of the Chester class were:

Ship	Shipyard	Laid down	Launched	Commissioned	Decommissioned	Fate
USS Chester (CS-1)	Bath Iron Works, Bath, Maine	25 September 1905	26 June 1907	25 April 1908	10 June 1921	Renamed York 10 July 1928, sold for scrap 13 May 1930
USS Birmingham (CS-2)	Fore River Shipyard, Quincy, Massachusetts	14 August 1905	29 May 1907	11 April 1908	1 December 1923	Sold for scrap 13 May 1930
USS Salem (CS-3)	Fore River Shipyard, Quincy, Massachusetts	28 August 1905	27 July 1907	1 August 1908	16 August 1921	Sold for scrap 11 February 1930

On 17 July 1920 these ships were reclassified with the new hull numbers CL-1 through CL-3 (light cruisers). On 10 July 1928 Chester was renamed York to free the name for USS Chester (CA-27).

== See also ==
- List of cruisers of the United States Navy

== Bibliography ==
- Bauer, K. Jack; Roberts, Stephen S. (1991). Register of Ships of the U.S. Navy, 1775–1990: Major Combatants. Westport, Connecticut: Greenwood Press. ISBN 0-313-26202-0.
- Friedman, Norman (1984). U.S. Cruisers: An Illustrated Design History. Annapolis, Maryland: Naval Institute Press. ISBN 0-87021-718-6.
- Gardiner, Robert; Chesneau, Roger (1979). Conway's All the World's Fighting Ships 1860–1905. New York: Mayflower Books. ISBN 0-8317-0302-4.
