= Charles Chesters =

British botanist (1904–1993)

Charles Chesters OBE FRSE FLS
- Born: Charles Geddes Coull Chesters; March 9, 1904; Glasgow
- Died: February 13, 1993 (aged 88); Quenington, near Cirencester
- Scientific career
- Fields: Botany
- Author abbrev. (botany): Chesters

Charles Geddes Coull Chesters OBE FRSE FLS (1904–1993) was a British botanist specialising in fungi and lichens.

== Life ==
He was born in Glasgow on 9 March 1904, the son of Charles Geddes Chesters, a commercial traveller, and Margaret Geddes. He attended Hyndland School in Glasgow. He was awarded a place at Glasgow University in 1922 and graduated BSc in botany in 1926.

His early interest lay in aquatic and salt-marsh vegetation. However, from 1931 he began to specialise in fungi, and founded the Research School in Phycomycetes (looking at fungi responsible for soil-born plant diseases) and Pyrenomycetes (wood- and bark-inhibiting fungi). At this time he was working with Walter Stiles FRS at Birmingham University. In 1937 he received a PhD for work in this field. In the war he served as an air raid warden. In 1944 he succeeded Thomas Bennet-Clark as professor of botany at Nottingham, holding this position for 25 years. He was also dean of faculty from 1945.

He was elected a fellow of the Royal Society of Edinburgh in 1953.

He retired in 1969 and moved to Quenington, where his daughter already lived.

In 1977 he received an OBE for services to education. He died at home on 13 February 1993 in Quenington, near Cirencester.

== Artistic recognition ==
A commemorative bust to Chesters stands in the Biology Building at the University of Nottingham.

== Publications ==
The standard author abbreviation Chesters is used to indicate this person as the author when citing a botanical name.

- A Method of Isolating Soil Fungi (1940)

== Other Positions Held ==
- President of the British Association for the Advancement of Science
- Co-founder of the Institute of Biology

== Family ==
He married Margaret Mercedes Cathie Maclean in 1928. They had a son, Charles and daughter Kathleen.
