= Chesterton =

Chesterton may refer to:

== Places ==
=== United Kingdom ===
- Chesterton, Cambridge
  - Chesterton railway station (closed)
  - Chesterton Rural District
  - Chesterton (UK Parliament constituency)
- Chesterton, Huntingdonshire, Cambridgeshire
- Chesterton, Gloucestershire
- Chesterton, Oxfordshire
- Chesterton, Shropshire
- Chesterton, Staffordshire
- Chesterton, Warwickshire

=== United States ===
- Chesterton, Indiana
  - Chesterton station (New York Central Railroad)
  - Chesterton Commercial Historic District
  - Chesterton Residential Historic District

== Other uses ==
- Chesterton (surname), including a list of people with the name
  - G. K. Chesterton (1874–1936), English author and philosopher
- Chesterton Community College, in Chesterton, Cambridge, UK
- Chesterton Academy, in Hopkins, Minnesota, United States
- Chesterton Academy of Buffalo, in New York, US
- Chesterton Academy of The Holy Family, in Lisle, Illinois, US

== See also ==
- Chestertown (disambiguation)
- Chesterton Range National Park, Australia
- Chestertons, a British estate agency chain
