= Chestertown =

Chestertown may refer to the following places in the United States:

- Chestertown, Maryland
  - Chestertown station
  - Chestertown Historic District (Chestertown, Maryland)
- Chestertown, New York
  - Chestertown Historic District (Chestertown, New York)

== See also ==
- Chesterton (disambiguation)
