= Chesterville, West Virginia =

Unincorporated community in West Virginia, United States

Chesterville
- Unincorporated community
- Location within the state of West Virginia Chesterville (the United States)
- Coordinates: 39°9′20″N 81°29′53″W
- Country: United States
- State: West Virginia
- County: Wood
- Elevation: 643 ft (196 m)
- Time zone: UTC-5 (Eastern (EST))
  - Summer (DST): UTC-4 (EDT)
- GNIS ID: 1537261

Chesterville is an unincorporated community in Wood County, West Virginia, United States.
