= Chesterwood =

Hamlet in Northumberland, England

Coordinates: 54.9806°N 2.267°W

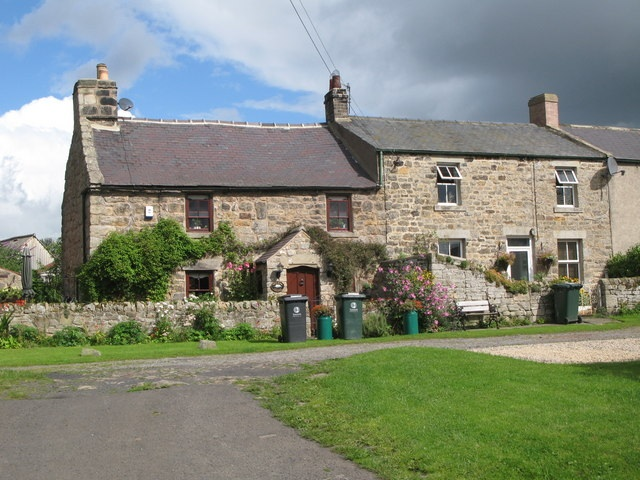
- Cottages in the hamlet

- Location within Northumberland
- OS grid reference: NY82976517
- Unitary authority: Northumberland
- Ceremonial county: Northumberland
- Region: North East
- Country: England
- Sovereign state: United Kingdom
- Post town: HEXHAM
- Postcode district: NE47
- Police: Northumbria
- Fire: Northumberland
- Ambulance: North East
- UK Parliament: Hexham

Chesterwood is a hamlet in Northumberland, in England. It is situated a short distance to the north-west of Haydon Bridge on the South Tyne, west of Hexham. It includes a number of "Bastle Houses" from the 17th Century, originally built to protect against raids by the Border Reivers. Unusually some of these Bastles are terraced. Just a couple of miles south of the Historic Hadrians Wall (Roman Wall) it lies in the Parish of Haydon and once had a Tower as the boundary of the property of the Barony of Langley. Langley Castle is located 3 miles south on the opposite side of the South Tyne Valley. There is an historical account of a murder in Chesterwood as burglars attempted to open the front door of the Bastle now known as "The Golf House" (so named as it was the club-house of a 9-hole golf course at the beginning of the 20th century). Frank Stokoe had his daughter slide the door bolt shut while he exited the house and crept around to the front door where he shot the would-be intruder dead.

== Governance ==
Chesterwood is in the parliamentary constituency of Hexham.
