= Chesterton (surname) =

Chesterton is an English toponymic surname of Old English origin, formed from the words ceaster and tūn, meaning "Roman fort homestead." Notable people with the surname include:

== People with the surname ==
- A. K. Chesterton (Arthur Kenneth, 1899–1973), British politician, cousin of G. K. Chesterton
- Ada Elizabeth Chesterton (née Jones, 1869–1962), British writer and philanthropist, wife of Cecil Chesterton
- Cecil Chesterton (1879–1918), British journalist, brother of G. K. Chesterton
- Frank Chesterton (badminton) (fl. 1909–1920), English badminton player
- Frank Sidney Chesterton (1877–1916), British architect, cousin of G. K. Chesterton
- George Chesterton (1922–2012), English cricketer
- G. K. Chesterton (Gilbert Keith Chesterton, 1874–1936), British writer and philosopher
- Henry Chesterton (1837–1883), British plant collector
- Oliver Chesterton (1913–2007), British businessman, son of Frank Sidney Chesterton
- Paul Chesterton (fl. 2007), English actor

== Fictional characters with the surname ==
- Gil Chesterton, in Frasier
- Ian Chesterton, in Doctor Who
- Terrence Chesterton, in Neighbours
