= Chester County =

Chester County may refer to:

- Chester County, Pennsylvania, United States
  - Chester County Council, boy scout council in Pennsylvania.
- Chester County, South Carolina, United States
- Chester County, Tennessee, United States
- Cheshire or the County Palatine of Chester, a ceremonial county in the North West of England, United Kingdom
- Cheshire County (disambiguation)
