= USS Chester (CL-1) =

Chester-class cruiser

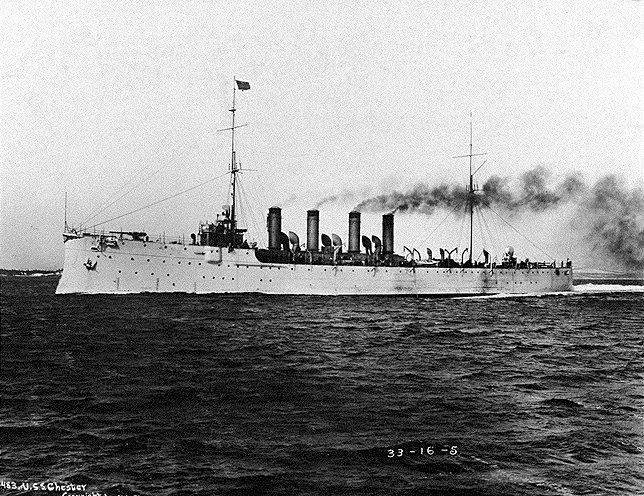
- USS Chester (CS-1), undated

History

United States
- Name: Chester (1905–1928); York (1928–1930)
- Namesake: City of Chester, Pennsylvania; City of York, Pennsylvania
- Ordered: 27 April 1904
- Awarded: 4 May 1905
- Builder: Bath Iron Works, Bath, Maine
- Cost: $1,688,000 (contract price of hull and machinery)
- Laid down: 25 September 1905
- Launched: 26 June 1907
- Sponsored by: Miss D. W. Sproul
- Commissioned: 25 April 1908
- Decommissioned: 10 June 1921
- Renamed: York, 10 July 1928
- Reclassified: CL-1, 17 July 1920
- Identification: Hull symbol: CS-1; Hull symbol: CL-1
- Fate: Sold for scrap, 13 May 1930

General characteristics (As built)
- Class & type: Chester-class Scout cruiser
- Displacement: 3,750 long tons (3,810 t) (standard); 4,687 long tons (4,762 t) (full load)
- Length: 423 ft 1 in (128.96 m) oa; 420 ft (130 m) pp
- Beam: 47 ft 1 in (14.35 m)
- Draft: 16 ft 9 in (5.11 m) (mean)
- Installed power: 12 × Normand boilers; 23,000 ihp (17,000 kW); 25,400 ihp (18,900 kW) (produced on Trial)
- Propulsion: 4 × Direct drive Parsons turbines; 4 × screws
- Speed: 24 kn (44 km/h; 28 mph); 26.52 kn (49.12 km/h; 30.52 mph) (Speed on Trial)
- Complement: 42 officers 326 enlisted
- Armament: 2 × 5 inches (127 mm)/50 caliber Mark 6 breech-loading rifles; 6 × 3 in (76 mm)/50 caliber rapid-fire guns (6x1); 2 × 3-pounder (47 mm (1.9 in)) Driggs-Schroeder saluting guns; 2 × 21 in (533 mm) torpedo tubes
- Armor: Belt: 2 in (51 mm); Deck: 1 in (25 mm) (aft)

General characteristics (1917)
- Complement: 63 officers 332 enlisted
- Armament: 4 × 5-in/51 caliber guns; 2 × 3-in/50 caliber rapid-fire guns; 1 × 3-in/50 caliber anti-aircraft gun; 2 × 3-pounder saluting guns; 2 × 21-in torpedo tubes

USS Chester (CS-1/CL-1) of the United States Navy was the first scout cruiser (CS) built for the Navy. In 1920, she was reclassified as a light cruiser (CL). She was launched on 26 June 1907, by Bath Iron Works, Bath, Maine, sponsored by Miss D. W. Sproul, and commissioned on 25 April 1908. She was named in honor of Chester, Pennsylvania. In July 1928, long since decommissioned, her name was changed to USS York, in honor of York, Pennsylvania.

== Pre-World War I ==
=== Up to 1914 ===
In the period prior to World War I, Chester operations included training activities off the East Coast and in the Caribbean, participation in the Fleet Reviews of February 1909, October 1912, and May 1915, and many duties of a diplomatic nature. She carried a Congressional committee on a tour of North Africa in 1909, and the next year, joined in a special South American cruise commemorating the 100th anniversary of the first autonomous government of Buenos Aires, Argentina. As American interests in the Caribbean were threatened by internal political changes in several nations, Chester patrolled off Mexico, Santo Domingo, and Haiti, and transported a Marine occupation force in 1911. Later that year, she carried men and stores to the steam patrol yacht Scorpion, station ship at the then-Austrian port of Trieste, returning to Boston with the American consul at Tripoli.

In April, 1912, Chester, and her sister the Salem were ordered by the United States Navy to escort the Cunard liner Carpathia back to New York City, after she had picked up the survivors from the sinking of the RMS Titanic.

After a period in reserve from 15 December 1911 – 5 November 1913, Chester returned to duty in the Gulf of Mexico guarding American citizens and property during the revolution in Mexico.

=== 1914 ===
In early 1914, Chester played a significant role in the United States occupation of Veracruz.

On 2 January 1914, Chester was off Gulfport, Mississippi. Aboard her, President Woodrow Wilson held a conference with John Lind, his personal envoy for Mexican affairs. (Note: At that time, there was no U.S. Ambassador to Mexico; President Wilson had appointed Nelson O'Shaughnessy as Chargé d'Affaires ad interim before Mexican President Victoriano Huerta.)

On 21 April, just after 08:00 hrs, immediately upon receipt of orders to "seize Custom House" at Veracruz, Admiral Frank F. Fletcher directed Admiral Henry T. Mayo "to send him the scout cruiser Chester from Tampico". Eventually, a fleet of at least seven ships left Tampico for Veracruz that day. Around midnight, on a moonless night, Chester was the second ship to arrive at Veracruz (after San Francisco).

Her captain, William A. Moffett, ...

[...] had held the Chester at her top speed of twenty-one knots since leaving Tampico, ignoring the protests of her anguished engines. Nearing port, Moffett established radio contact with the Prairie. Fletcher warned him that the harbor lights were out, which would make navigating the eighty-six-foot-wide passage between the breakwaters into the inner harbor a hazardous undertaking. When Moffett asked for instructions, however, Fletcher left the matter to his discretion; if he wished, he could wait outside the breakwater until dawn. Moffett chose to run straight in, bringing the Chester through the narrow opening in a breath-taking display of seamanship and nerve. He dropped anchor at the Sanitary Warf at 00:05 hrs. From the Prairie, Fletcher signaled "Well done".

For this action, Moffett was awarded the Medal of Honor.

On 22 April, around 03:00 hrs, Chester's battalion landed at Pier 4.

On the morning of 22 April, around 08:30 and 09:00 hrs, the guns of Chester were decisive in supporting the successful land attack on the southeastern sector of Veracruz, shelling the Naval Academy and other buildings in the area.

The Chester transported refugees to Cuba, performed various diplomatic missions, and carried mail and stores to the squadron off Veracruz until 19 June 1914.

She returned to Boston for overhaul and another period in reserve, from 12 December 1914 – 4 April 1915.

=== After 1914 ===
Late 1915 and early 1916 found Chester in the Mediterranean to aid in relief work in the Middle East, and off the Liberian coast to protect American interests and show American support for the government there threatened by insurrection. Chester returned for duty as receiving ship at Boston, where she was out of commission in reserve from 10 May 1916 – 24 March 1917.

== World War I ==
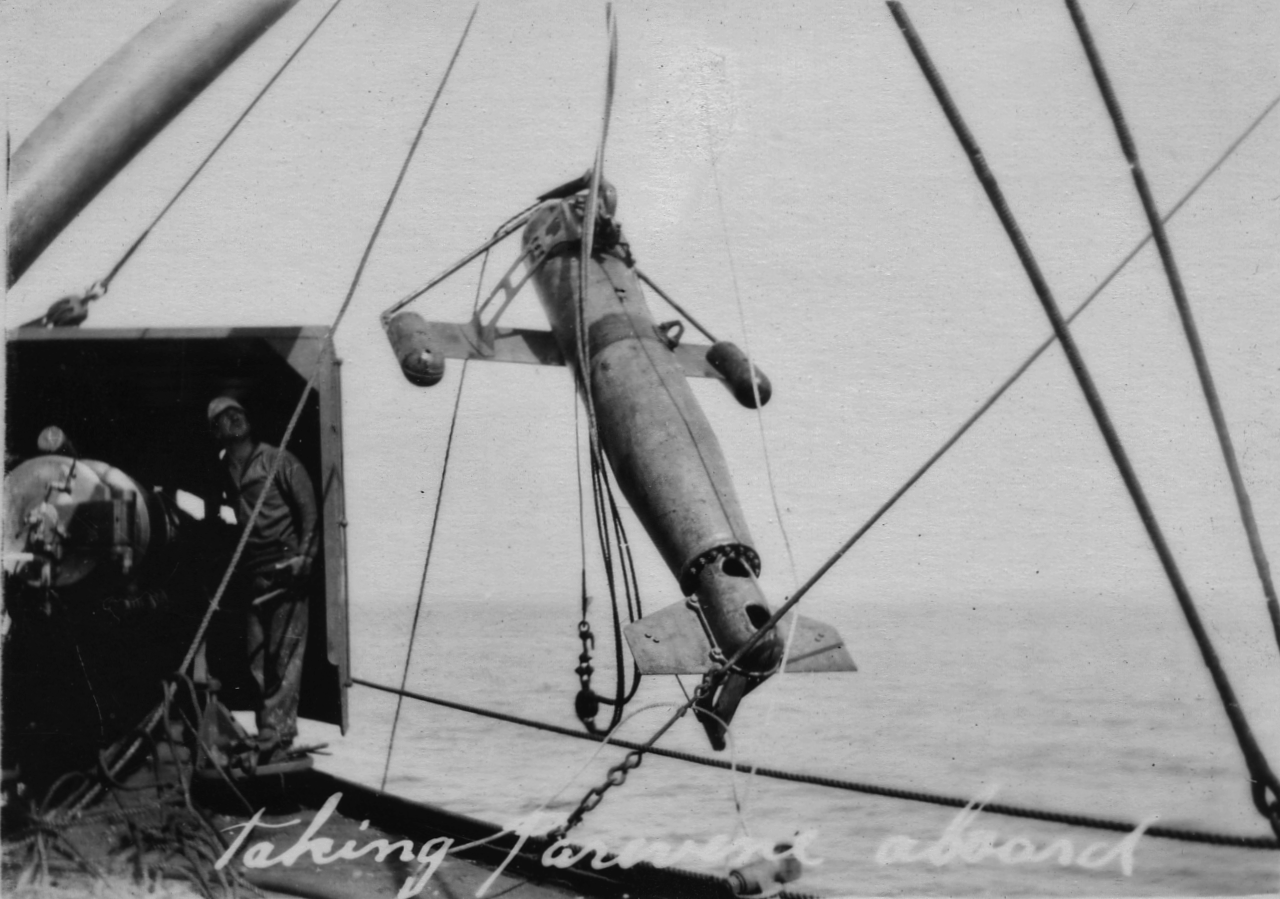
Bringing a paravane aboard the Chester in 1918.

When recommissioned, Chester operated on protective patrol off the East Coast until 23 August, when she sailed for Gibraltar, and duty escorting convoys on their passage between Gibraltar and Plymouth, England. On 5 September 1918, the cruiser sighted an enemy submarine on her starboard bow. In attempting to ram the enemy, Chester passed directly over the submarine as she dived, damaging her own port paravane. Depth charges were hurled at the submarine's presumed position, but no further contact was made.

At war's end, Chester carried several Allied armistice commissions on inspection tours of German ports, then carried troops to the Army units operating in northern Russia. On her homeward bound voyage, on which she cleared Brest, France, on 26 April 1919, she carried Army veterans to New York, which she reached 7 May. 11 days later, she arrived at Boston Navy Yard for overhaul, and was decommissioned there on 10 June 1921. In 1927, she was towed to Philadelphia Navy Yard, and on 10 July 1928, her name was changed to York. She was sold for scrap on 13 May 1930.
