= SS Chester =

History
- Name: SS Chester
- Operator: 1884–1897: Manchester, Sheffield and Lincolnshire Railway; 1897–1910: Great Central Railway
- Port of registry: (United Kingdom)
- Builder: Edward Withy and Company, Hartlepool
- Launched: 29 April 1884
- Fate: Sunk in collision 28 September 1910

General characteristics
- Tonnage: 1,010 gross register tons (GRT)
- Length: 238.6 feet (72.7 m)
- Beam: 32.2 feet (9.8 m)
- Depth: 14.1 feet (4.3 m)

SS Chester was a passenger and cargo vessel built for the Manchester, Sheffield and Lincolnshire Railway in 1884.

== History ==
Chester was built by Edward Withy and Company in their Middleton Yard at Hartlepool and launched on 29 April 1884, sponsored by Miss Florence Withy. She was designed for the passenger and cargo service between Grimsby, England, and Hamburg, Germany. She had a long poop deck, a long bridge house, and a long topgallant forecastle. The bridge house was fitted up for the accommodation of thirty first-class passengers (including ladies’ cabin), the captain, and so on. There was accommodation in the forecastle for second-class passengers, and in the poop aft for officers and crew. In the ‘tween decks were fittings for 100 emigrants.

On 4 December 1885, Chester was involved in a collision with her sister ship Wakefield, which resulted in the sinking of Wakefield and the drowning of her stewardess.

In 1897, Chester passed to the Great Central Railway. On 28 September 1910 she was in a collision in the River Elbe with a Swedish steamer which resulted in her being badly damaged. She was beached to prevent sinking. However, she sank quickly into the soft moving sand and became a total wreck, the water having flooded her holds.
